= Art of the late 16th century in Milan =

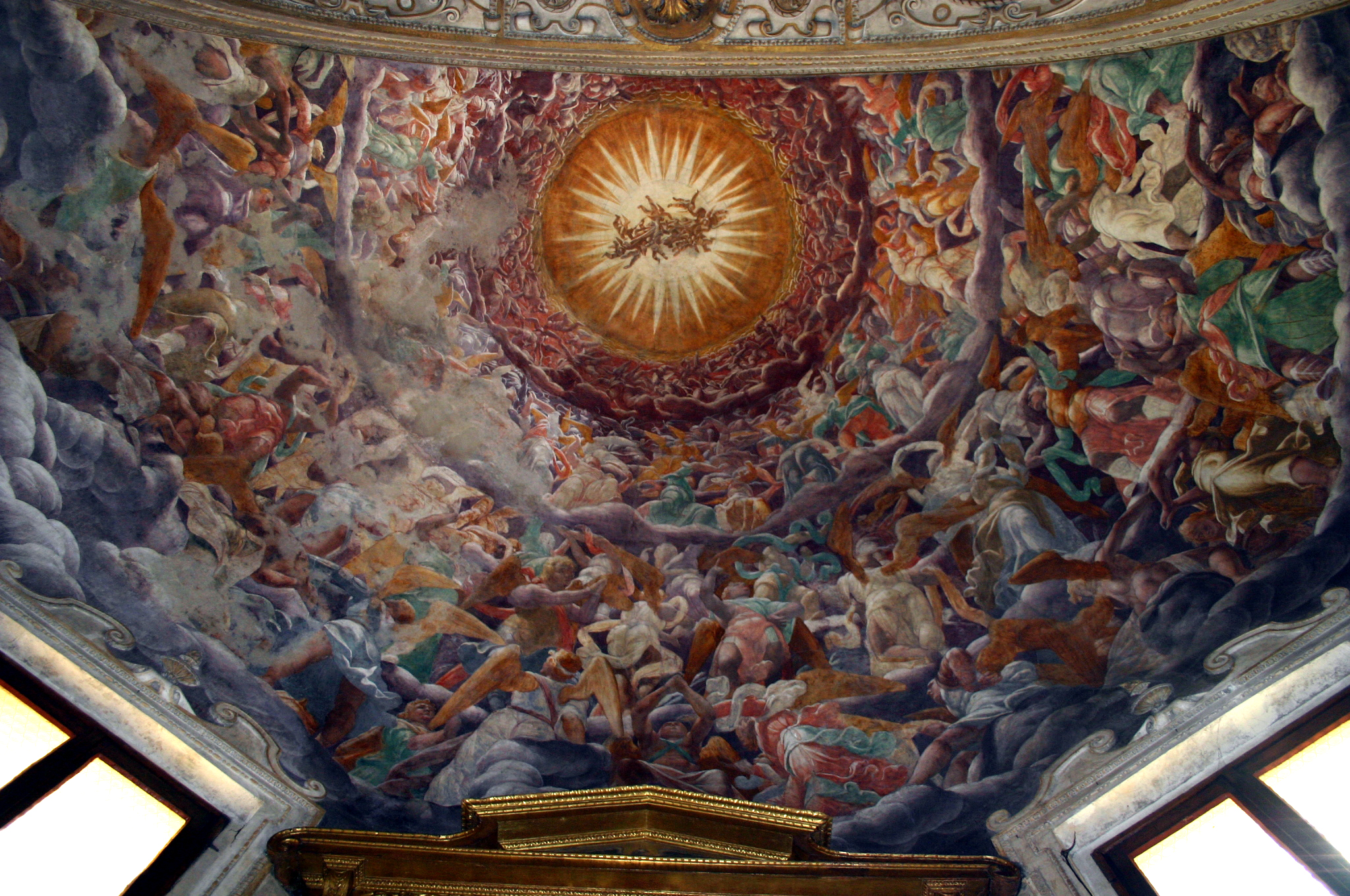
Giovanni Paolo Lomazzo, Angelic Glory (1570-71), Foppa Chapel, Church of San Marco

The art of the late 16th century in Milan developed, as elsewhere, along several strands and styles summarized in Mannerism, Counter-Reformation art, and Classicism. These currents divided the city's art scene, often undergoing mutual influences.

The Milanese art scene of the late 16th century must therefore be analyzed by considering the city's particular position: while for the Spanish Empire it represented a strategic military outpost, from a religious point of view it was at the center of the conflict between the Catholic and Reformed Churches. Consequently, the greatest contribution was made by religious art in the face of less civil artistic and architectural production.

Although in adopting the Mannerist style, the city's patrons and artists had examples of central-Italian derivation as reference, the city's location near Protestant Switzerland made Milan one of the main centers of the flourishing and elaboration of Counter-Reformation art, due to the widespread action of the archbishops St. Charles Borromeo and Federico Borromeo.

== Religious architecture ==
=== The Instructiones of Charles Borromeo ===
If anyone argues that the rites, vestments and outward signs used by the Catholic Church in the celebration of Mass are incitements to impiety rather than instruments of devotion, may he be an anathema [...]

— From Decrees of the Council of Trent dated September 17, 1562, canon 7

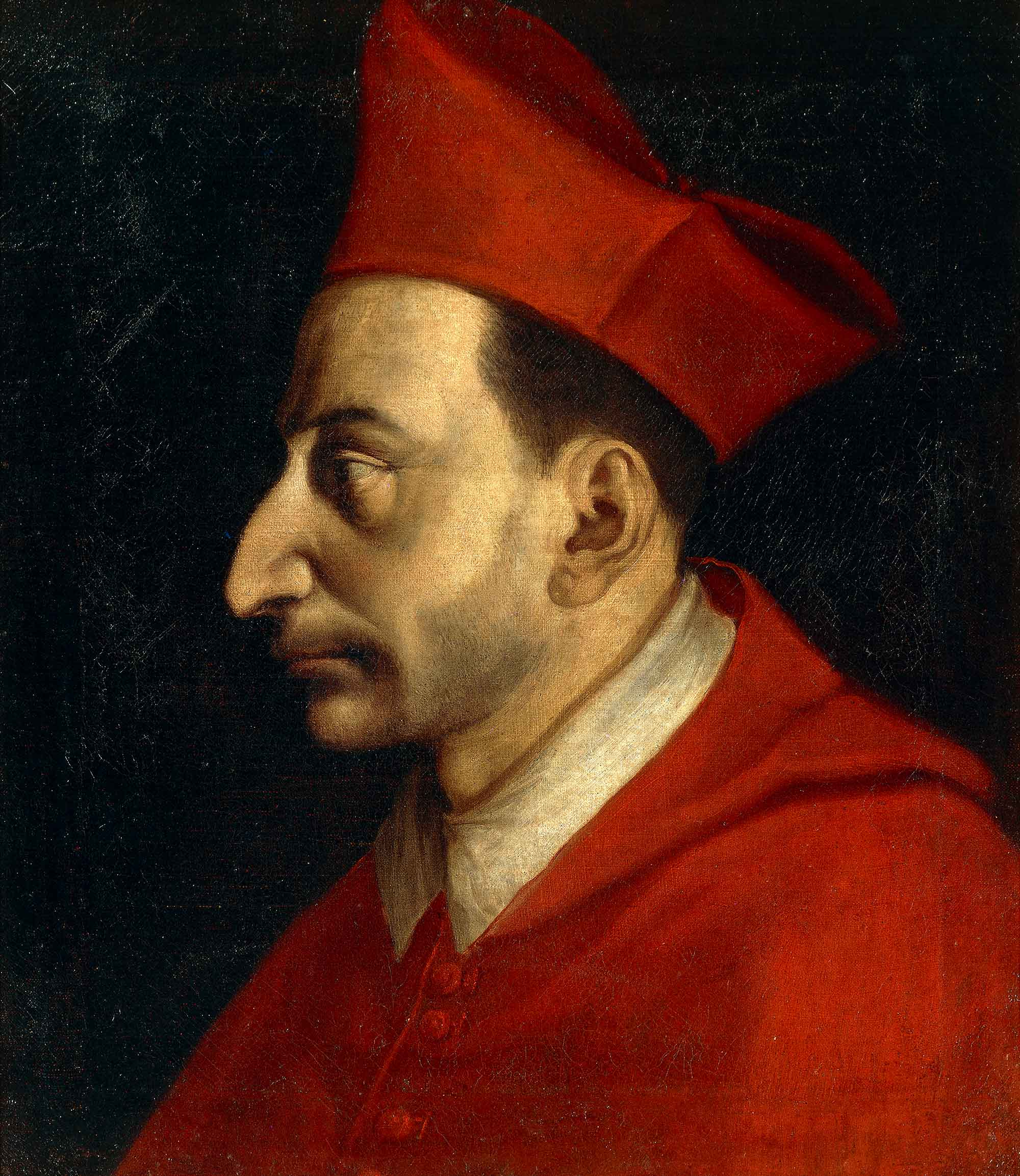
Ambrogio Figino, Portrait of St. Charles Borromeo (1585), Pinacoteca Ambrosiana, Milan

With the advent of the Council of Trent and the Counter-Reformation Church, ecclesiastical authorities exploited art as a means of spreading the new doctrines in opposition to Protestantism and other heresies; art was therefore subjected to strict canons and controls so that artists depicted episodes from the most original biblical tradition. Since there were few regulations for architecture alone, Cardinal Charles Borromeo, among the protagonists of the Council of Trent, drew up the Instructiones fabricae et suppellectilis ecclesiasticae, that is, an architectural compendium regulating the construction of new churches. These provisions guided the development of religious buildings in the following years until they were also applied in Latin America, then part of the Spanish Empire. As indicated by the Council's decrees, elaborate and monumental art was supposed to impress the faithful, prompting them to contemplate and learn religious doctrine: the representations, though grand and solemn, would be easy to understand even by the uneducated populace. This was obviously at odds with Protestant doctrine, which regarded excessive and lavish decorations as a distraction to the faithful or even heresy.

Borromeo begins the Instructiones by talking about the location of the church, which should be in an elevated position if possible and secluded from noise or noisy places, and detached from other tenements except the residence of the priest or bishop. The number of steps to reach such a location should be odd. Guidance is also given on the size of the church, which must be sufficiently capacious to accommodate the faithful for special occasions. Among the most important details is the form of the plan, for which Borromeo recommends the use of the Latin cross at the expense of the central plan: although used in many illustrious cases, especially in the Renaissance, Borromeo considered the central plan a reference to pagan temples and used to a lesser extent in Christian architecture, while the Latin cross was justified by the supremacy of the early basilicas that used this form.

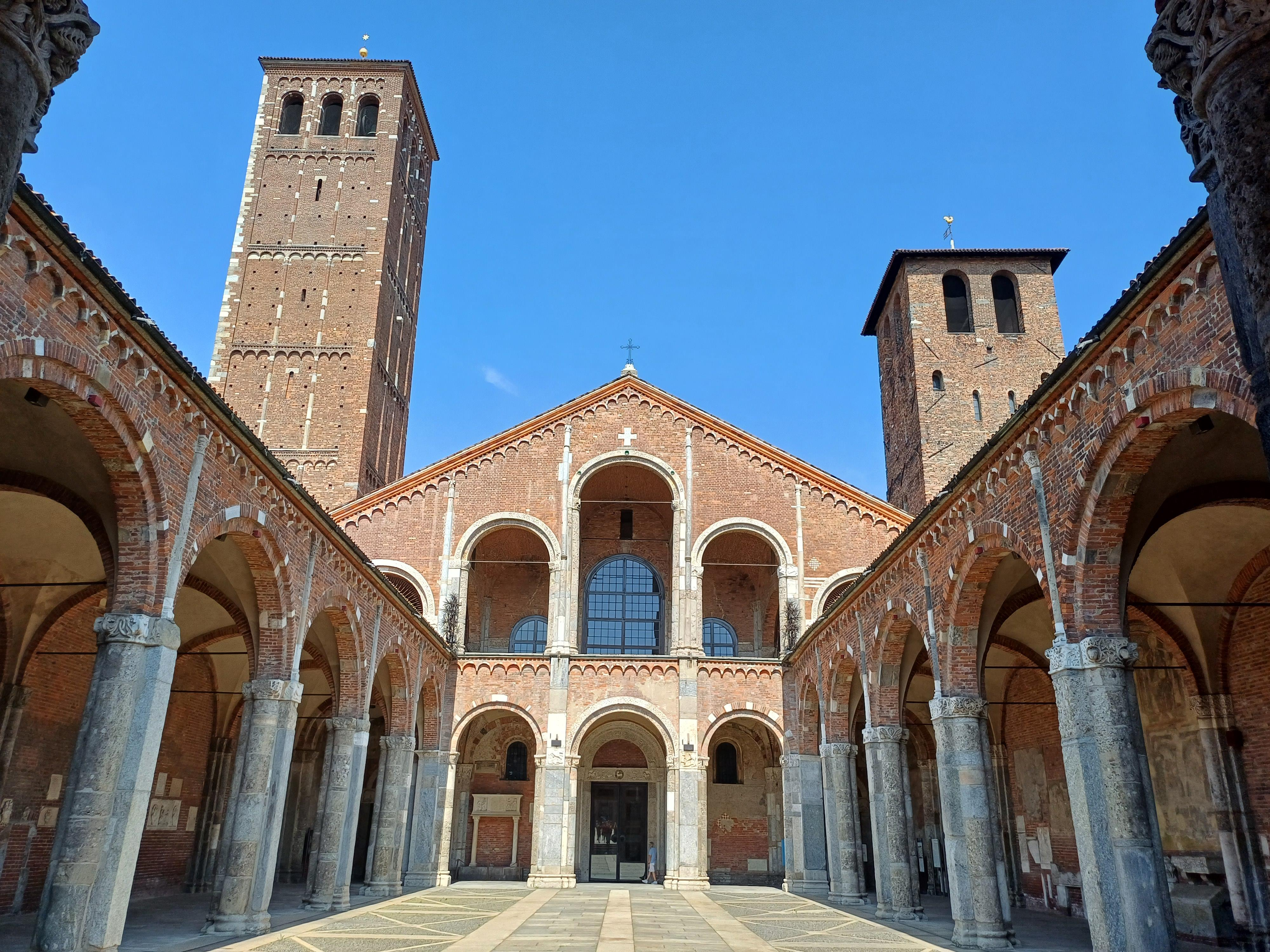
The quadriporticus of the Basilica of St. Ambrose, taken as a model by Cardinal Borromeo

As for external decoration, the cardinal specifies how it should be concentrated on the main façade, when not absent on the side walls, which should not be decorated with images in any case: in the third chapter, a sort of clause is inserted subordinating the architect's work to the bishop's judgment. The "supremacy" of the early churches is taken up in the fourth chapter regarding the entrance of the churches: if possible the church should have an "atrium" on the model of the quadriporticus of the Basilica of St. Ambrose, however in the case of lack of space or money more modest solutions such as a pronaos or a simple portal between columns are allowed: however, this rule is often disregarded in the city of Milan. For the same reason he recommends rectangular entrance doors of ancient basilicas in odd numbers, half as wide as they are tall, contemplating frames of various shapes with decorations.

Indications of a purely practical nature are then given, such as making sure that the roof in case of rain does not cause moisture or water infiltration, and regarding the floor the norms are more celebratory and ideological: in the most important churches and major chapels the covering must be of marble, while brick is left only to small churches and minor chapels; it is fundamental that there be no sacred images or crosses on the ground, which would thus be trampled. Borromeo then moves on to the interior of the church, starting with the chapel and the high altar: both should be monumental and as ornate as possible, and indications are also given on measurements and placement, with possible solutions in case the ideal setting is not possible.

Particular importance is given to the choir, which may be in front of or behind the high altar, but in any case must be well divided and distinguishable from the rest of the church dedicated to the faithful. The explication then goes on to include practical and ideological indications with various levels of detail: from more important orders such as the construction rules of the baptistery and sacristy, to individual architectural elements such as confessionals and pulpits, and finally to the storage rooms for the various sacred furnishings; the section finally ends by contemplating the presence of an oratory and defining the structure of a possible nuns' church.

=== Pre-Counter-Reformation Churches ===
Domenico Giunti of Tuscany and Galeazzo Alessi of Perugia were the first architects to break away from the Lombard late Renaissance tradition. To the former are owed the churches of San Paolo Converso and Sant'Angelo, set according to the same construction scheme of a single nave with side chapels with a barrel-vaulted roof, a citation of Alberti's Basilica of Sant'Andrea already found in Bramante's church of Santa Maria presso San Satiro.

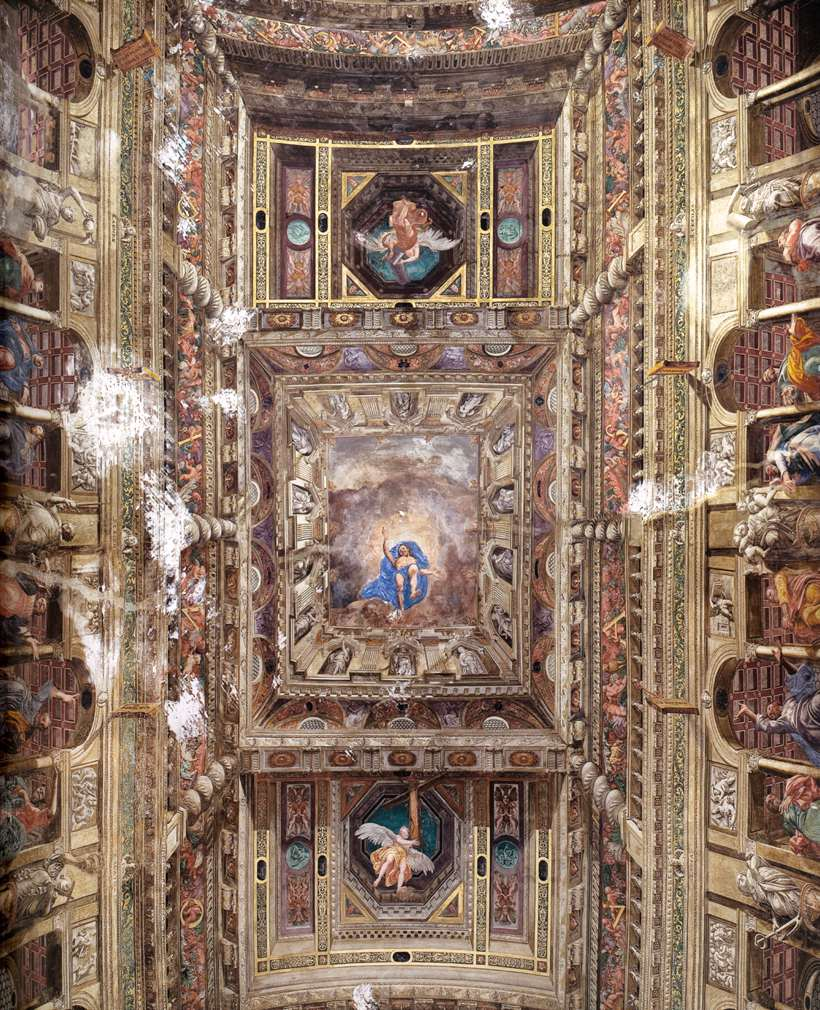
Vincenzo Campi, Ascension of Christ (1588), church of San Paolo Converso

The church of San Paolo Converso, an attribution sometimes disputed, was begun in 1549 to be in an advanced state as early as two years later; the façade dates from the early seventeenth century, yet it is heavily influenced by the Milanese works of Tibaldi and was designed with decoration and monumentality in mind according to Borromeo's Instructiones. The interior was largely decorated by the Campi brothers and is among the most representative of Milan's late 16th century: more than the decorations of the six chapels along the nave and the partition between the hall and the room intended for the cloistered nuns, Vincenzo Campi's large fresco on the vault of the Ascension of Christ, a great example of late Renaissance perspective illusionism in the footsteps of Bramante's more famous false choir in Santa Maria presso San Satiro, is noteworthy. Overall in the pictorial decoration there emerges a certain influence with the central-Italian Mannerist tradition, above all Giulio Romano, while inspirations from Correggio's frescoes of the Parma Cathedral Dome can be seen in the perspective of the frescoed vault; finally, the results of the Beheading of St. John the Baptist and the Martyrdom of St. Lawrence by Antonio Campi in the first and third chapels on the right are sometimes catalogued in the current of "pre-Caravaggism."

The church of Sant'Angelo dates back to 1552, when it was completely rebuilt after demolishing the remains of the old church damaged by the wars that occurred in the city at that time. The project included the three cloisters of the church, demolished in the 20th century, leading to the façade dating back to the 17th century: originally Giunti had planned a façade with strict proportions, sober and practically without decoration, but this was never realized. The structure of the church was designed as a Latin cross with a single nave with a barrel vault and a total of sixteen side chapels. In the chapel dedicated to St. Catherine of Alexandria, one can observe on the sides the canvases of the Stories of St. Catherine (1564) by Antonio Campi, who sets the story in a nocturnal setting often echoed in Caravaggio's settings, in which, moreover, the Cremonese painter anticipates the luminism used by Merisi; in the chapel of St. Jerome and the chapel dedicated to the Virgin Mary are paintings by Ottavio Semino of Mannerist style with Flemish influences, however mitigated by early post-Tridentine teachings, for which the painter chose scenes of everyday life. Ottavio Semino frescoed the head of the transept, while the sacristy is adorned with Peterzano's oil on canvas of the Mystic Marriage of St. Catherine (1579); finally, the tomb of Bishop Pietro Giacomo Malombra is attributed to Annibale Fontana.

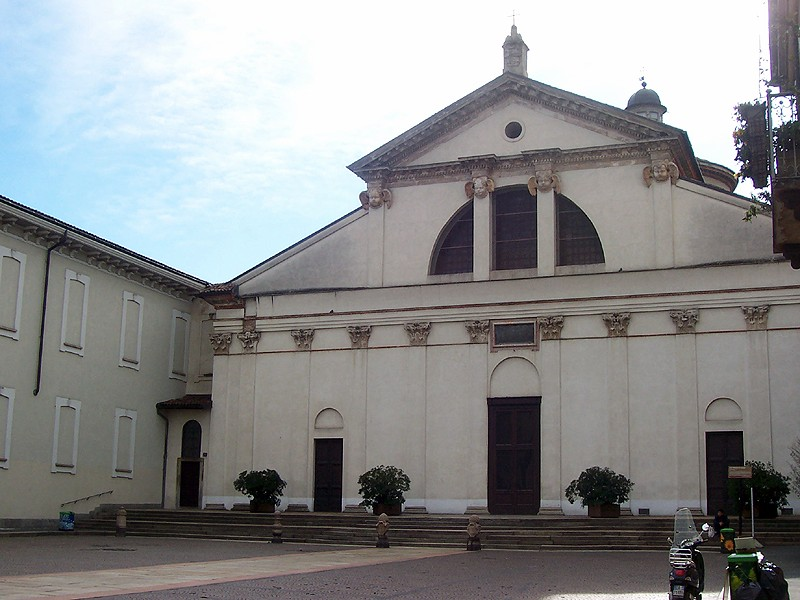
Unfinished facade of the church of San Vittore al Corpo

Vincenzo Seregni's first work in Milan, excluding his apprenticeship in the Fabbrica del Duomo, was in the reconstruction of the church of San Vittore al Corpo in a collaboration with Alessi: the two architects anticipated the Counter-Reformation architectural canons in the internal structure by means of the longitudinal layout with a natural outlet to the space of the dome: the internal structure was compared by James Ackerman to Palladio's Basilica of San Giorgio Maggiore, in which the Venetian architect combined the central plan with a Latin cross plan. To continue with the similarities between the two churches, the original design included for the facade a monumental pronaos surmounted by a tympanum that echoed the partitions of the facade of San Giorgio. Built beginning in 1559 on the remains of the old early Christian Basilica of San Vittore, the new church was set in an inverted orientation from the previous one, and it was necessary to demolish the imperial mausoleum of Maximian in order to finish the work; the work lasted until late in the seventeenth century, and the facade was never completed according to the original design. The interior is divided into three naves, the major one presenting a barrel vault while the two side ones have ribbed vaults decorated with stucco and frescoes: while the structure retains its 16th-century appearance, the decorations are largely of the 17th century. Notable is the late sixteenth-century wooden choir with the Stories of Saint Benedict based on Aliprando Caprioli's fifty engravings of the saint's life and miracles.

Alessi continued in his Counter-Reformation program with the construction of the new church of St. Barnabas for the Barnabite fathers, an order recently created to foster the spread of Tridentine doctrine: the single-nave interior layout can be considered one of the earliest attempts at a "basilica of the Reformation." The church's interior was built in the late sixteenth century. From a decorated facade, albeit without the typical late-16th-century plasticism, one enters the interior divided into three rooms to allow for the monastic life of the order and the prayers of the faithful: the first room consists of a single nave with a barrel vault, so intended in order to improve the acoustics in the friars' oratory to the faithful, while the other two consist of the rectangular-based presbytery with a pavilion vault and the square-based choir with a rib vault. The interior works include Aurelio Luini's Pietà in the second right chapel, St. Jerome by Carlo Urbino in the choir, and Peterzano's early works in Milan with the Vocation of Saints Paul and Barnabas and Saints Paul and Barnabas in Listri in which the influence of his Venetian training, especially Titian and Tintoretto, emerges clearly; finally, some works by the Campi brothers and Lomazzo once in the church are now exhibited in the Brera Art Gallery.

=== The prototype of the Counter-Reformation church: the church of San Fedele ===
However, the nobility of this architecture of ancient taste is not only undoubted, but it is as much architectural in the proper sense as was done in Italy between Michelangelo and Palladio

— Cesare Brandi, Design of Italian architecture

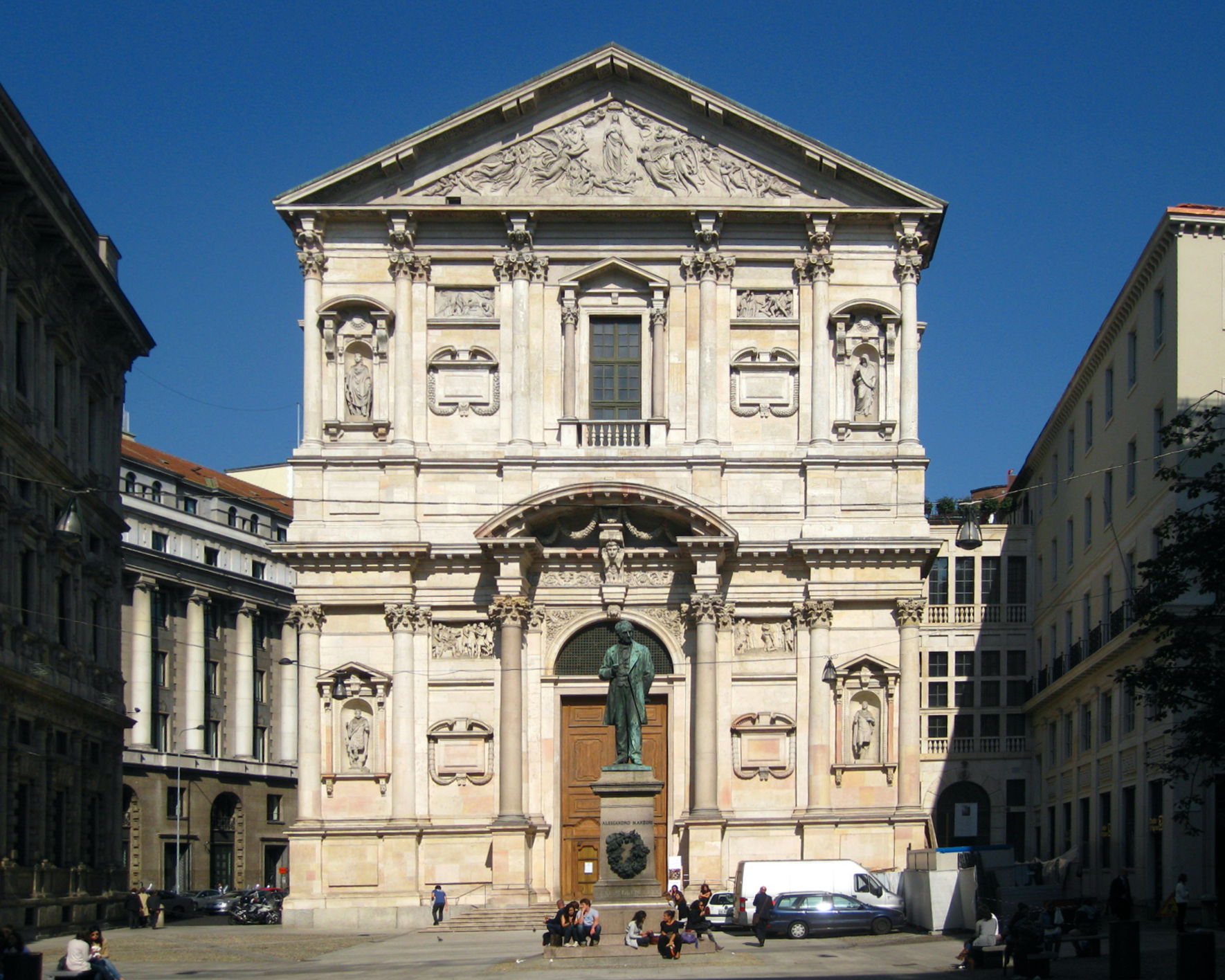
Façade of the church of San Fedele

In the Counter-Reformation program of Cardinal Charles Borromeo in the city of Milan, there was also the purpose of bringing to the city the company of Jesuits that he had gotten to know during his sojourns in Rome: the cardinal placed their headquarters in the old church of San Fedele, which proved inadequate for Borromeo's propaganda, so Pellegrino Tibaldi was commissioned to construct a new building. The construction went on for many years, and among the various interventions there was also the demolition of some blocks of flats to make way for the square in front: many comparisons have been made about the structure of the church with the Basilica of Santa Maria degli Angeli e dei Martiri and with Vignola's Church of Jesus, along with which it is considered the model of the "church of the Counter-Reformation."

Although the two architects had never come into contact, Jesuit construction superintendent Giovanni Tristano had the opportunity to assist Tibaldi on the Milan building site: both churches have a single-nave layout with the natural vanishing point toward the altar overlooked by the brighter space of the dome, thus creating vertical directionality and anticipating Baroque "static dynamism" themes. Finally, the similarities continue in the decoration of the facade on which the decoration is concentrated at the expense of the sides.

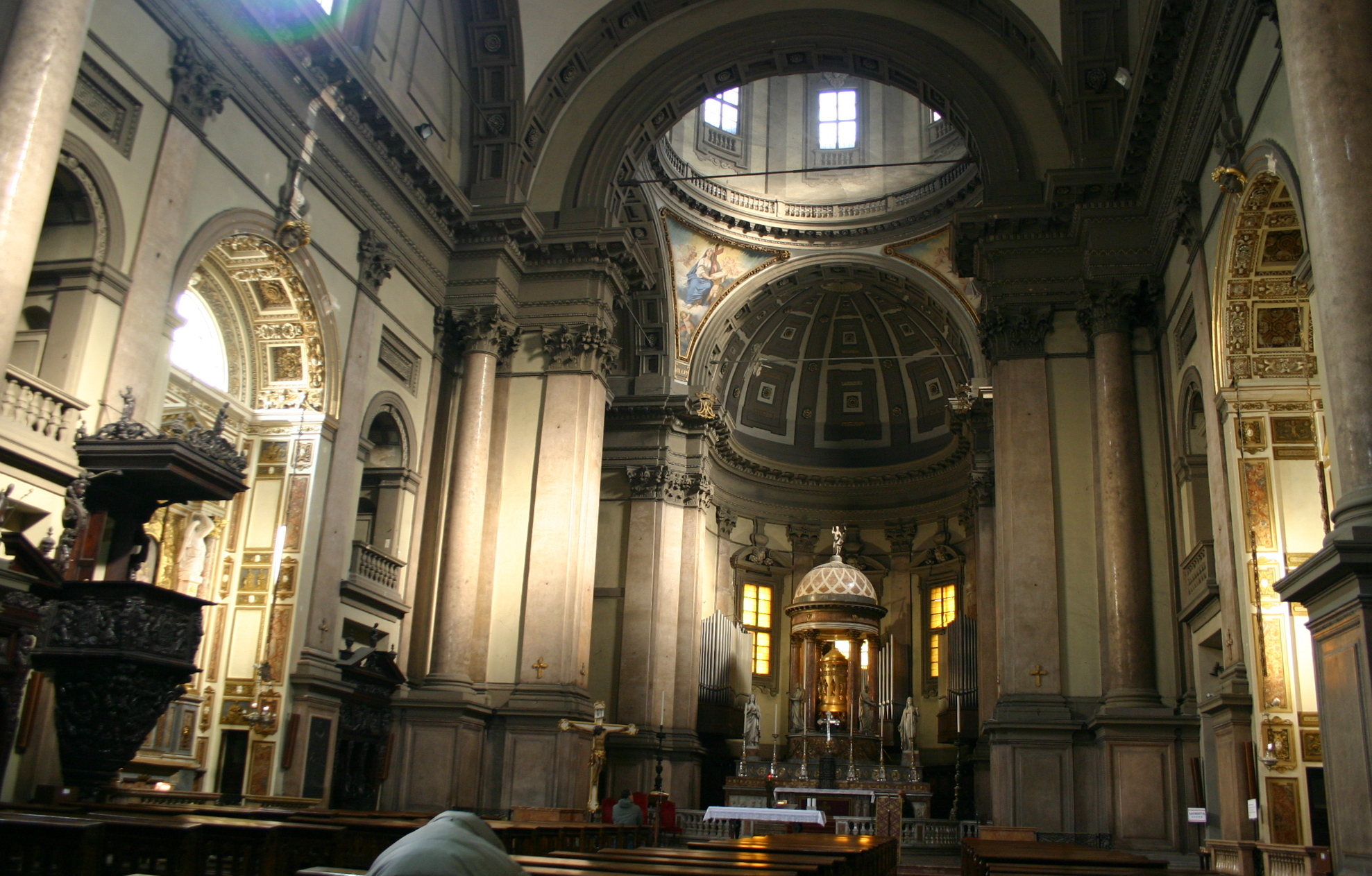
Interior of the church

The facade of the building was designed taking into account the subsequent opening of a square, which would have been narrow anyway, so the measurements and proportions of the church were sized to give the small space as monumental an appearance as possible. The compositional scheme of the front is set on two horizontal orders and divided into five vertical sections: in the central one is the portal with a curvilinear tympanum supported by columns of Corinthian order; the side sections show a certain symmetry with bas-reliefs and niches, all surmounted by a triangular tympanum. The resulting facade represents a meeting point between typically Mannerist plasticism and the canons of Counter-Reformation architecture.

The same division into two orders of the front is also taken up for the side façade, whose upper order rests directly on the lower order, instead of being set back as usual to create space for the side chapels: this solution was unprecedented in sixteenth-century architecture both in Milan and Rome, and as such it was also one of the first churches to present the two orders of the main façade of equal size. While there is no shortage of examples of facades with overlapping orders of equal width, the facade still covered the setback of the sides. For the scheme of the main facade as well as the decorated tympanum, finished according to the original design only in the 19th century, Tibaldi took inspiration from the division into five vertical fields of the design of the church of Santa Maria presso San Celso. As for the portal, Pellegrino Tibaldi adhered to the model of the Gesù church although with numerous stylistic debts to Michelangelo in the windows of the side façade, whose frames trace those of the Palazzo dei Conservatori, or in the niches similar to those of St. Peter's Basilica.

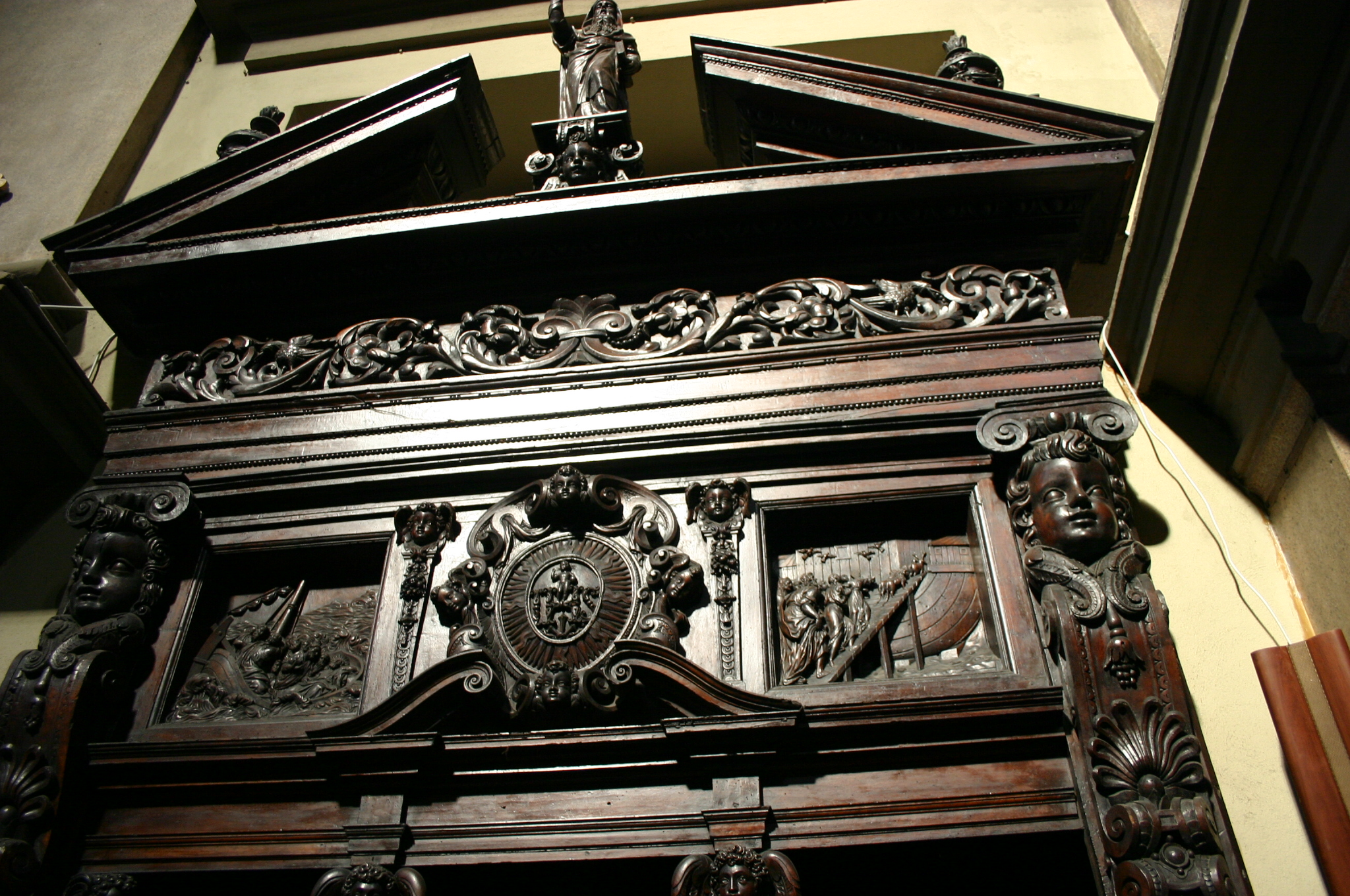
Detail of the wooden confessional

The interior has a single nave with a ribbed vaulted roof, with the side chapels and carved wooden confessionals carved into the thickness of the walls. All along the church are columns of giant order independent of the perimeter walls, following the example of the church of San Bernardino in Urbino and the church of San Salvatore in Spoleto. This solution performs a unifying function of the environment dedicated to the faithful, well delimited by the places designated for preaching and administration of the sacrament on the example of the Gesù church and Borromeo's norms. The best-known feature of the church is the space created by the vaults supported by giant columns resting on a pedestal, and it was in all probability the first Milanese church to be decorated with an order of columns of that size. In carving the spaces out of the wall for the chapels, with three bays with a wider central one flanked by two smaller ones, he was inspired by Alberti's basilica of Sant'Andrea in Mantua, a scheme already widely used by Bramante and Giulio Romano. Inside are, in addition to carved wooden confessionals depicting Scenes from the Life and Passion of Christ, altarpieces of the Deposition by Peterzano and the Transfiguration by Bernardino Campi.

The church of San Fedele thus represented the prototype of the Jesuit churches of the years to come: visited by various Jesuit architects such as Pieter Huyssens, Heinrich Schickhardt, and Joseph Fürttenbach, the church's model was explicitly taken up in the churches of Sant'Ignazio in Arezzo, San Carlo in Bastia, Sant'Andrea in Savona, and the church of the college in Fidenza, as well as the church of the Holy Martyrs in Turin. The church was also a point of reference for the architecture of the Milan area, as in the church of Sant'Ambrogio alla Vittoria in Parabiago in the layout and proportions of the space, or in Richini's church of San Giuseppe and Lorenzo Binago's Sant'Alessandro, which make use of the giant order of columns untied to the wall, a motif soon taken up outside the city in Lantana's New Cathedral in Brescia and Mansart's Royal Chapel of the Invalids; while in the Milanese San Giorgio al Palazzo and the Sanctuary of the Crucifix in Como, a use of the ribbed vault is made quite similar to the San Fedele.

More generally, the frequent use that was made of the church model, the wide range of quotations from famous models, as well as its adherence to the norms of the Instructiones, make the church of San Fedele the prototype of the Counter-Reformation church.

=== Churches of the Instructiones ===
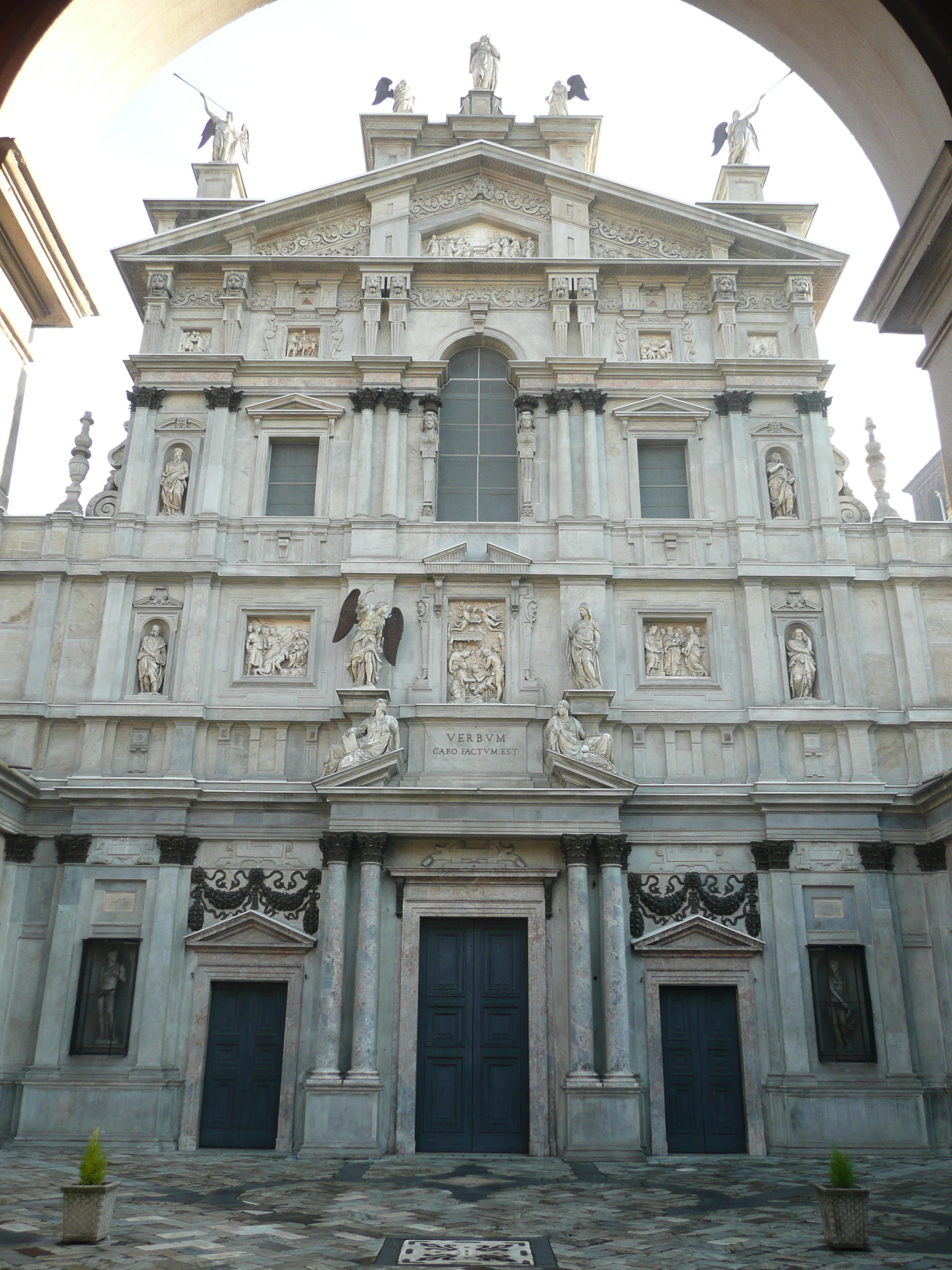
Façade of the church of Santa Maria presso San Celso

The church of Santa Maria presso San Celso was begun in the 15th century, but much of its appearance is due to designs made from 1570 onward. The facade was designed by Alessi, originally based on Michelangelo's designs for the Florentine Basilica of San Lorenzo. The design was later modified and completed by Martino Bassi: however, the typical elements of the Perugian architect already present in Palazzo Marino can be recognized, resulting in a rich plastic decoration, contrasting, however, with Solari's pre-existing late Renaissance quadriporticus. The facade is made of marble, divided into four horizontal and five vertical orders, and is centered on the elaborate portal with a broken tympanum supported by four columns: the central part is the most decorated, with statues surmounting the portal, lavish bas-reliefs, and the large window contained in the space of a double order of pilasters holding up the tympanum with carved stories from the Bible. The rich decoration of the front is extended throughout the available space by statues and bas-reliefs made mainly by Annibale Fontana and Stoldo Lorenzi, whose main themes are the Annunciation and Assumption of the Virgin Mary.

The church has as rich a sculptural apparatus inside as it does outside: of particular note are the statue of the Virgin (1586) in the altar of the Virgin of Miracles designed by Martino Bassi and St. John the Evangelist in the tribune by Fontana, and the David and Moses beside the organ on the counter-façade and St. John the Baptist with Abraham (1578) in the tribune by Stoldo Lorenzi. The choir is actually a work of sculpture because of the complexity of its forms and was made by Paolo Bazza starting in 1570 to be finished many years later with many changes to the original design. The high altar, designed by Martino Bassi in 1584, is in keeping with the rich decorations of the church and well represents the Milanese decorative arts that were reaching their peak at the time: it is framed by the wooden choir designed by Galeazzo Alessi. Finally, it is worth mentioning the altarpiece of the Resurrection by Antonio Campi, in which the painter shows off his skill in illusionistic painting.

Among the various renovations of ancient churches was the one at the Garegnano Charterhouse, with the addition of the portico and the design of a new façade starting in 1573 under the direction of Vincenzo Seregni: the current façade divided into three descending orders does not perfectly follow the original design, so it is thought to have undergone reworkings during the early seventeenth century given its references to the early Baroque style. Although the decoration of the interior is largely of the 17th century, noteworthy are the frescoes of the Crucifixion, the Adorations of the Magi and the Shepherds, and the altarpiece depicting the Madonna and Child with Saints by Simone Peterzano, in which he shows a mitigated depiction of the Counter-Reformation norms imposed by the Carthusian friars of the church.

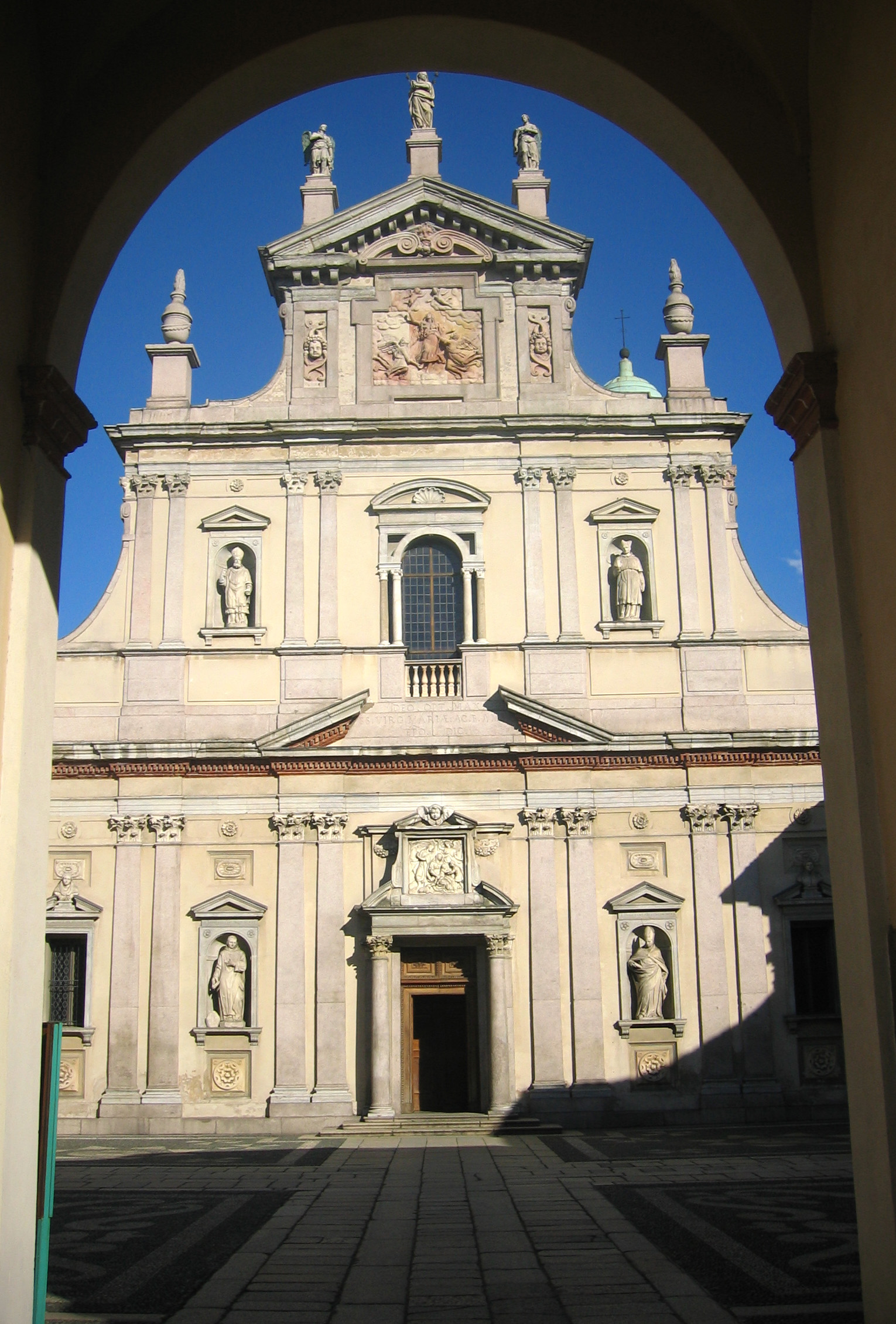
Façade of the Garegnano Charterhouse

Martino Bassi's most important works also include the reconstruction in classicist forms of the dome of the Basilica of San Lorenzo, which collapsed in 1573: the new forms of the dome probably inspired Borromini for the dome of Sant'Ivo alla Sapienza. The reconstruction was actually supposed to involve the structure in its entirety, however, due to the close control of the archbishop, the works included only the dome and the remodeling of other minor parts of the church, leaving intact, by express order of Borromeo, the plan with the circular path.

In 1576 came the project for the completion of the construction site of Santa Maria della Passione, in which Martino Bassi transformed the building then with a Greek-cross plan, a structure disliked by the post-Tridentine authorities, in favor of a Latin-cross structure by lengthening the nave, with the result being a church with three naves, with the outer two flanked by semicircular extradosed chapels: Bishop Gerolamo Ragazzoni of Famagusta in a visit after the work was completed praised the work for its adherence to the new architectural standards. The choice of chapels visible from the outside as half-cylinders was one of the most peculiar solutions of the work and traces Brunelleschi's unfinished project for the Basilica of Santo Spirito in Florence. Works related to the second half of the 16th century inside the church include the organ panels by Carlo Urbino, the right transept frescoed also by the Cremasque painter, and the Crucifixion altarpiece (1560) by Giulio Campi. The imposing dimensions that resulted from the modification of the church led to the remaking of the street that led to the front of the church: from a winding and narrow alley it was changed to a wider and straighter street that made it easier to observe the church.

On the other hand, two churches were built with a central plan despite Borromeo's preference for the Latin-cross plan, both by Tibaldi: the church of San Carlo al Lazzaretto and the church of San Sebastiano, which are also united by the common circumstance of construction, namely because of the plague that ravaged the city in those years.

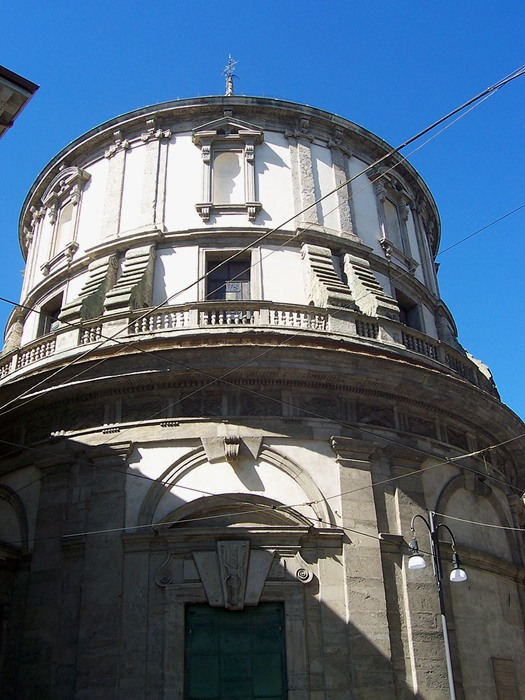
Entrance to the church of San Sebastiano

The church of San Carlo al Lazzaretto was commissioned by Charles Borromeo in 1580 to Pellegrino Tibaldi, although in fact the work was supervised by Giuseppe Meda. The structure consisted of a central octagonal plan with as many openings; the building originally served as an open temple for the altar already present in the center of the Lazaretto. The choice of the central plan obeyed precise functional criteria indicated in the Instructiones; the open central plan would have allowed all those present in the Lazaretto to attend Mass without having to move, a criterion of no small importance when considering the conditions of the plague victims: the solution was taken up years later for the construction of the chapel of the Lazaretto in Verona.

For the same reason, Cardinal Borromeo then ordered that 19 altars be built at various points in the city where daily masses would be celebrated that could be attended by the plague victims locked in their homes. Of these altars, the column of St. Martiniano near Verziere, the column of St. Marolo near San Nazaro and the column of St. Helen near San Paolo Converso remain today.

The construction of the church of San Sebastiano began in 1577 as a thanksgiving to the saint for the end of the plague. The central plan solution in this case is an exception to the post-Tridentine rules: it was possible to find exceptions to the instructions for functional reasons or environmental reasons, such as lack of space, both of which are not apparent here. The structure is all the more an exception given the explicit references to the pantheon and the Bramantean temple of San Pietro in Montorio, as well as the drum-masked dome inspired by the baptistery of San Giovanni in Florence. However, the architect made precise changes in the internal structure to carve out spaces to accentuate the directionality between the building's entrance and altar; an anticipation of the theme of the Baroque elongated central plan. This behavior recognized in certain artists, that is, the use of the norms on architecture while not detaching from or completely overcoming humanistic culture, has been referred to as "Critical Mannerism."

Finally, the church of San Raffaele built from 1579 onwards is attributed to Tibaldi, in which the decorations with sculpted herms in the lower order stand out. Inside can be found the altarpiece of St. Matthew and the Angel (1586) by Ambrogio Figino in which a mixture of Michelangelo's classicism and Lombard naturalism can be observed, which probably served as an inspirational model for the two versions on the same subject by Caravaggio for the Contarelli chapel.

The church of Santa Maria al Paradiso was built on an old Franciscan convent: construction started in 1590 and was already completed in 1604. To the old layout is owed the single nave with eight side chapels, later frescoed in the 1600s, and the wooden choir with twenty-one saints all facing the high altar.

=== The work of the cathedral ===
Finally, Cardinal Borromeo could not fail to intervene to bring the city's cathedral up to the new Tridentine norms, thus giving a boost to the work on the building, which had been proceeding slowly since the fall of the duchy.

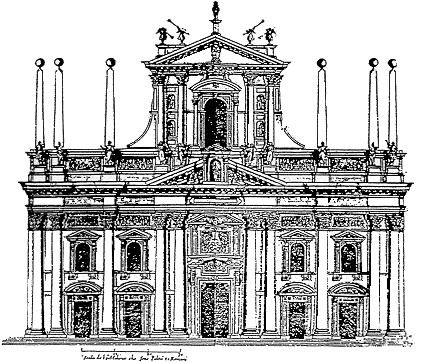
Tibaldi's design for the facade of the Milan Cathedral

The main interventions in artistic value and number were the work of Pellegrino Tibaldi, a "favorite" of the cardinal: one of the main debates of the time was over the design of the facade. Tibaldi proposed a solution in line with the style of the time that was detached from the rest of the Gothic cathedral, which can be included among the most important unrealized projects of the time, which Cesare Brandi describes as follows:

The beautiful classical insertions that still, fortunately, have been preserved represent one of the most extraordinary demonstrations of the permissibility of coexistence between two opposing styles

The design called for a facade in two orders: the lower one marked by giant columns of Corinthian order supporting the entablature, corresponding to the side naves, and an upper order corresponding to the nave flanked by monumental obelisks. Of the project, only the five lower portals and the windows above the four side portals were actually built, moreover not under Tibaldi's supervision, but of his major pupil Francesco Maria Richini.

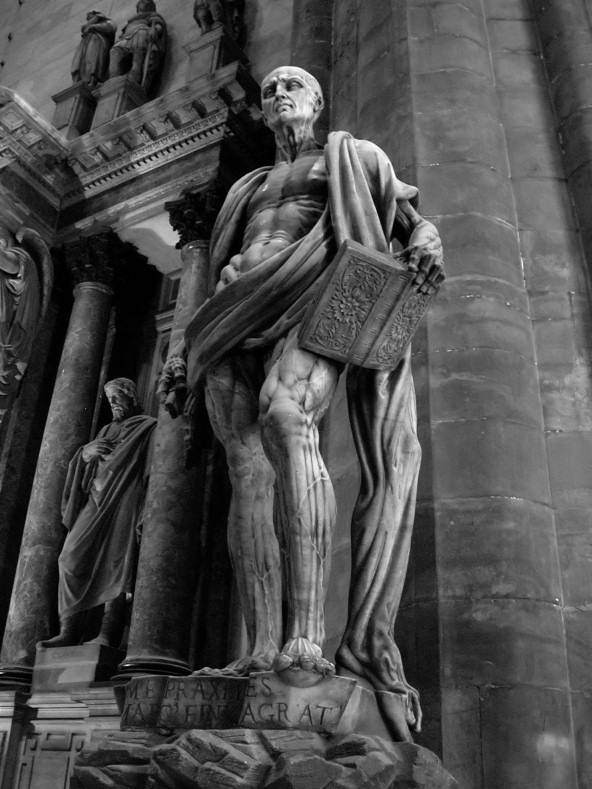
Marco d'Agrate, St. Bartholomew flayed

Inside, owed to Tibaldi are the three monumental altars in the right aisle near the transept, which share the polychrome marble structure with the pediment supported by Corinthian order columns, adorned with various statues. His major contribution to the interior decoration occurred, however, in the area of the chancel: his are the designs for the square-plan temple with Corinthian columns above the baptistery, and much of the arrangement of the high altar, above all the bronze ciborium in the form of a circular temple with eight columns supporting a dome adorned with statues, a masterpiece of sixteenth-century casting art. Beneath the altar is the crypt of St. Charles Borromeo, organized on two annular paths, one circular and the other octagonal, respectively, over which, moreover, a furious controversy arose with Vincenzo Seregni over alleged problems with the structure's statics. Finally, Pellegrini is credited with the marble flooring of the cathedral and the designs for the wooden choir carved with the Stories of Saint Ambrose and History of the Milanese Archbishops. Finally, from this period are the north and south organs, commissioned respectively from Giovanni Giacomo Antegnani and Cristoforo Valvassori, and the related panels by Giuseppe Meda and Ambrogio Figino.

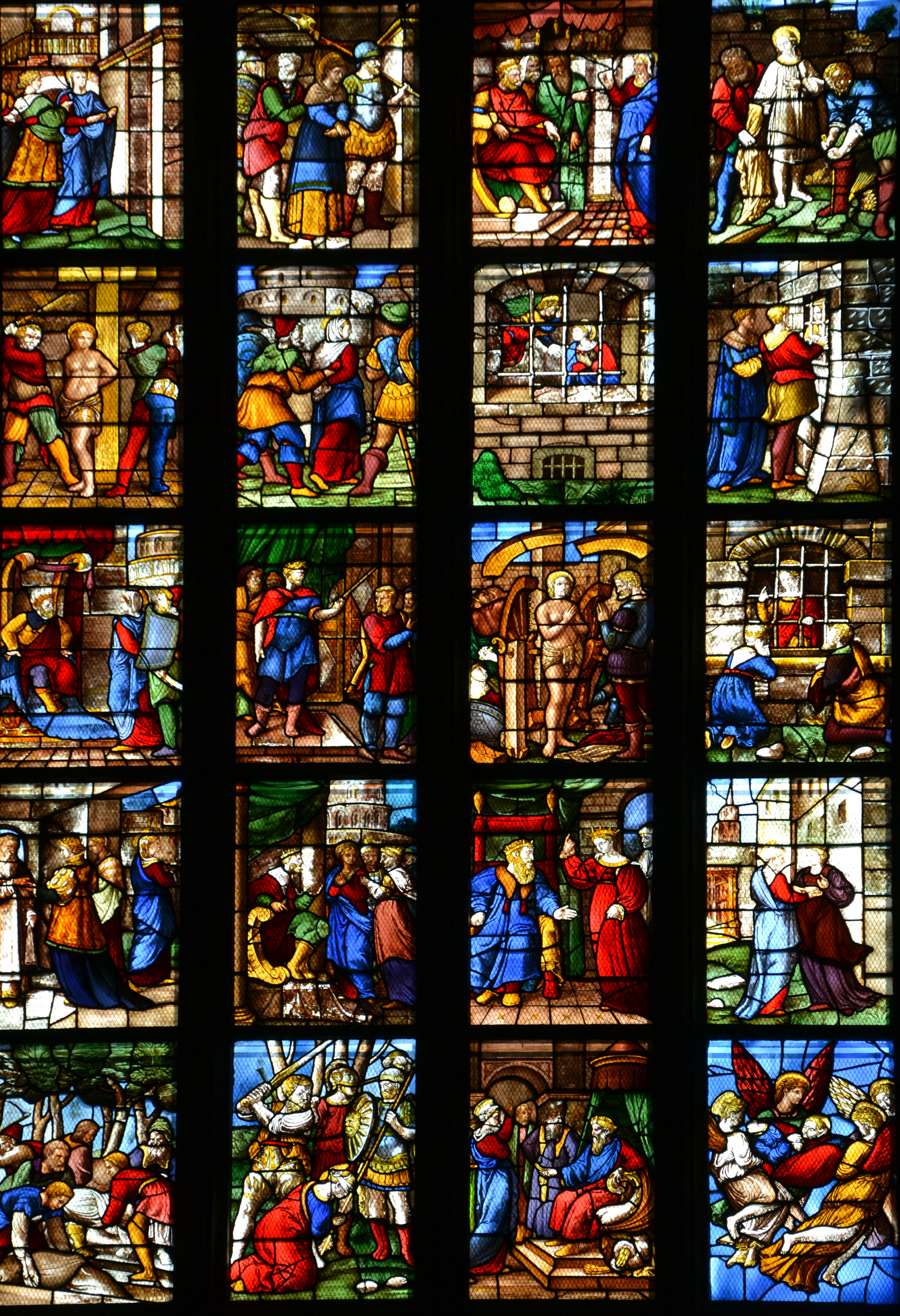
Giuseppe Arcimboldi, Stained Glass Window of Saint Catherine

A work by Leone Leoni is the funeral monument to Gian Giacomo Medici in the Southern Cross Arm, commissioned by his brother Pope Pius IV from the sculptor from Arezzo at the suggestion of Michelangelo, who was originally approached for the work. The work is supported by six marble columns sent from Rome directly by the pontiff, in the middle of which is the deceased in the guise of a Roman soldier, flanked by statues of Militia and Peace, with two smaller statues above the outermost columns depicting Prudence and Fame. Originally there was also a cast bronze sarcophagus, later removed by Cardinal Borromeo along with the various coffins of dukes and civilians in an attempt to counter the secularization of the cathedral. However, the most famous sculptural work in the church is the flayed St. Bartholomew by Marco d'Agrate, famous both for the virtuosity of the depiction of the flayed saint holding his skin and for the ambitious signature clearly visible on the work, which reads "NON ME PRAXITELES, SED MARCUS FINXIT AGRAT" (Not Praxiteles made me, but Marco d'Agrate).

In the ambulatory is a second monument to Pope Pius IV, also commissioned by him, the work of Sicilian sculptor Angelo De Marinis, described and praised already by Vasari. Opposite, on the other hand, are three altars designed by Tibaldi, echoing their forms, with high-reliefs and other decorations by Marco Antonio Prestinari. Finally, the monument commissioned by Giovanni Angelo Arcimboldi in honor of him and the Arcimboldi family was probably designed by Alessi.

Work also continued on the stained glass windows, though registering a slight change in the way of working, in which design and execution were often divided: the former was carried out by a skilled painter, while the latter by a skilled craftsman. Among the most famous stained-glass windows is the stained-glass window of the Holy Four Crowned Saints (1567), executed by Corrado Mochis based on a design by Pellegrino Tibaldi, in which stylistic debts to Michelangelo are noticeable. Also on the wave of a separate design there is the work of Arcimboldi, the most famous of all being the stained-glass window of St. Catherine, a youthful composition by the artist in which the traces of his particular Mannerism can be seen, also made by Corrado Mochis, but also some pieces of the Old Testament stained-glass window, in which Flemish and Rhenish artists also participated. Also from the Milanese circle of artists, there is the stained-glass window of the Apostles (1567) by Carlo Urbino, in which the twelve apostles are simply depicted, and the stained-glass window of the Glories of the Virgin by Giovanni da Monte of Titianesque derivation, whose pupil he was. Finally, of note is the monumental stained-glass window that is among the many works commissioned by Pope Pius IV to commemorate his brother Giacomo, the stained-glass window of St. James the Greater, designed by a Roman master, also by Mochis.

== Civil architecture ==
=== Palazzo Marino ===
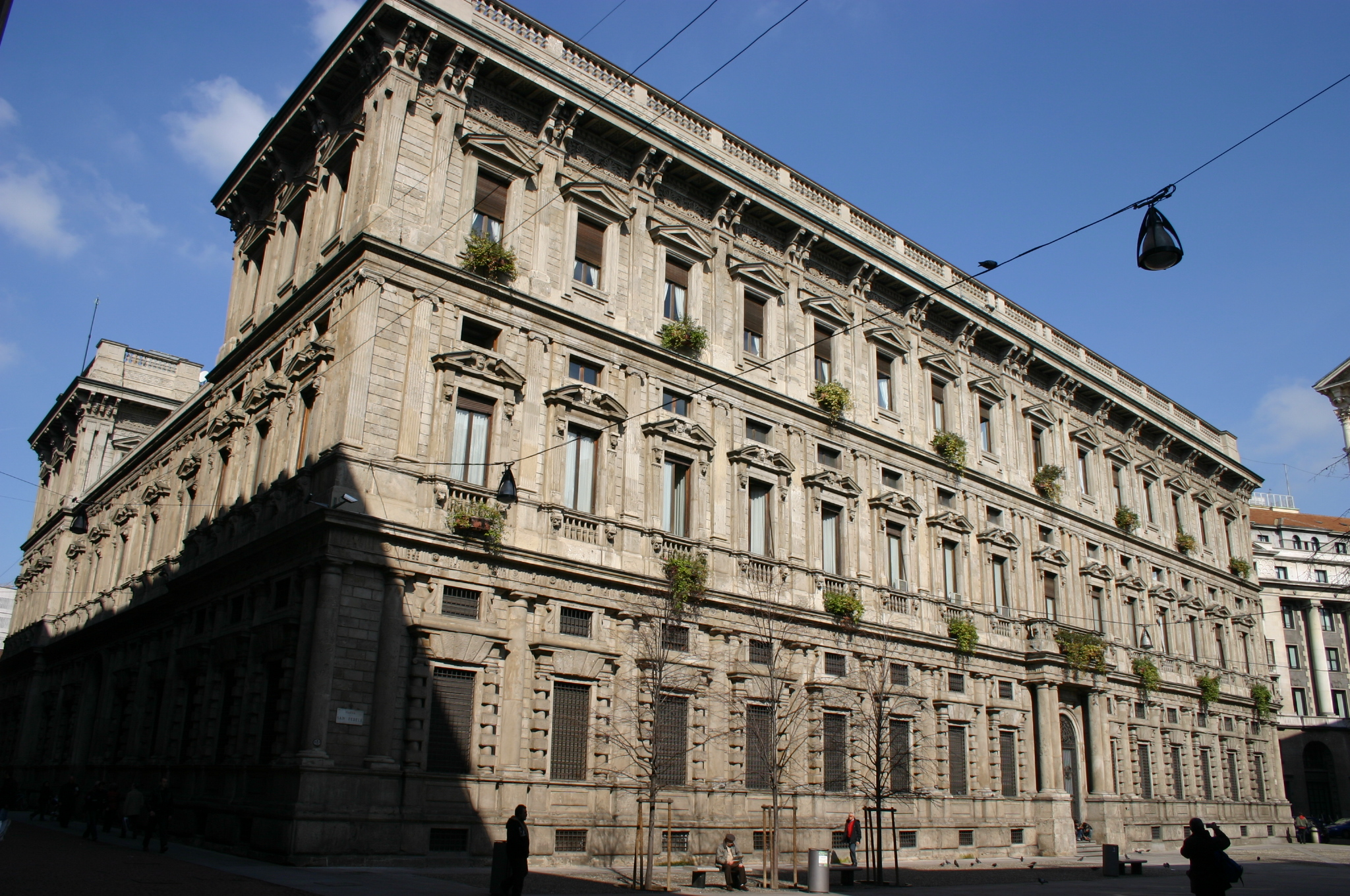
Palazzo Marino from Piazza San Fedele

The building site of the Marino Palace introduced Galeazzo Alessi to Milan: it is certainly the architect's most famous city work, and the palace is regarded as Milan's most representative Mannerist civil architecture; after this work, Alessi's commissions steadily increased until the arrival of Tibaldi. After this first commission, however, the Perugian architect lacked the necessary research and evolution of his style, which led him to works, though dignified, far from the achievements of Palazzo Marino and the basilica of Carignano, considered his best works. The palace was contracted by Ciarotto Marinaro, a Genoese businessman who had enriched himself in Milan under Spanish rule and thus wanted to show off his newly acquired power. The work, in addition to the body of the building, included the opening of a street connecting the palace with Piazza Duomo in the immediate vicinity of Piazza Mercanti. The original project with the opening of the new street finds famous precedents with Villa Farnese in Caprarola and especially with Strada Nuova in Genoa, with which it would have shared the width of the new district and the celebratory intent of the new ruling class.

An early design envisioned the ground floor in ashlar with columns of Tuscan order, while on the upper floor pilasters would take up the Tuscanic forms of the lower columns, surrounded by decorations in Ceppo dell'Adda stone, Saltrio stone and Carrara marble.

The palace was completed many years later, with a completely new urban layout that distorted the vision of the original project: Piazza della Scala in the sixteenth century did not yet exist, so the main front was on Piazza San Fedele; while the current main entrance on Piazza della Scala was executed only in the nineteenth century as a perfect copy of the other facade.

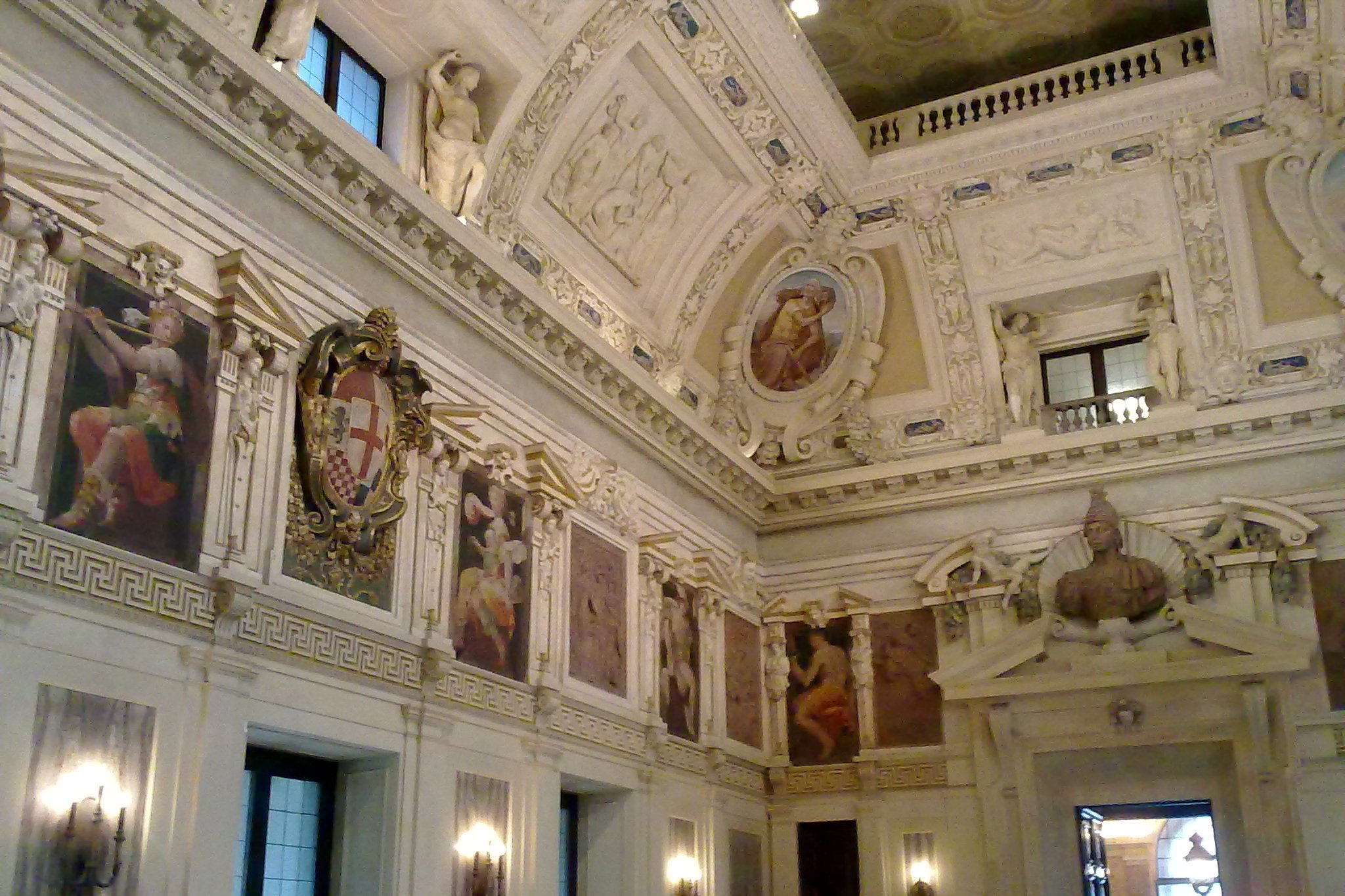
Alessi Hall at the Marino Palace

The final design conceived a palace set on three superimposed orders of the two main fronts: the ground floor is punctuated by Doric order pilasters containing windows with ashlar shoulders and an architrave with keystones, with small windows on the cymatium; the entrance portal is enclosed between twin columns supporting the balcony. The upper floor has fluted Ionic lesenes containing windows with baluster parapets and a broken curvilinear tympanum, again surmounted by small windows. The second floor has windows with triangular gables surmounted by a frieze and women's heads supporting the baluster cornice. Inside, worthy of mention is the courtyard of honor, famous for its rich decorations, set up as a double loggia supported by paired Ionic columns: this composition departs from the typical designs of Alessi, who must have drawn from local tradition: a tradition observed and taken up first by Richini in the courtyard of the Brera Palace and later by Borromini in the cloister of the Trinitari at the church of San Carlo alle Quattro Fontane.

With this project, Alessi made a clear break with the Lombard building tradition: the palace built entirely of stone broke away from the conventional Lombard building technique, which wanted the structure in terracotta bricks at most covered with plaster, while the roof, no longer pitched, was made of terraces in the Genoese tradition.

Of the interior rooms, once celebrated for their magnificence, little remains due to the Allied bombing that heavily affected the palace. Noteworthy among them all is the Alessi Hall, decorated with stuccoes, lesenes and medallions, and the frescoes by brothers Andrea and Ottavio Semino of Psyche and Cupid in the presence of the gods and the twelve Allegorical Figures on the walls, reconstructed after the war.

=== Other civil architecture ===
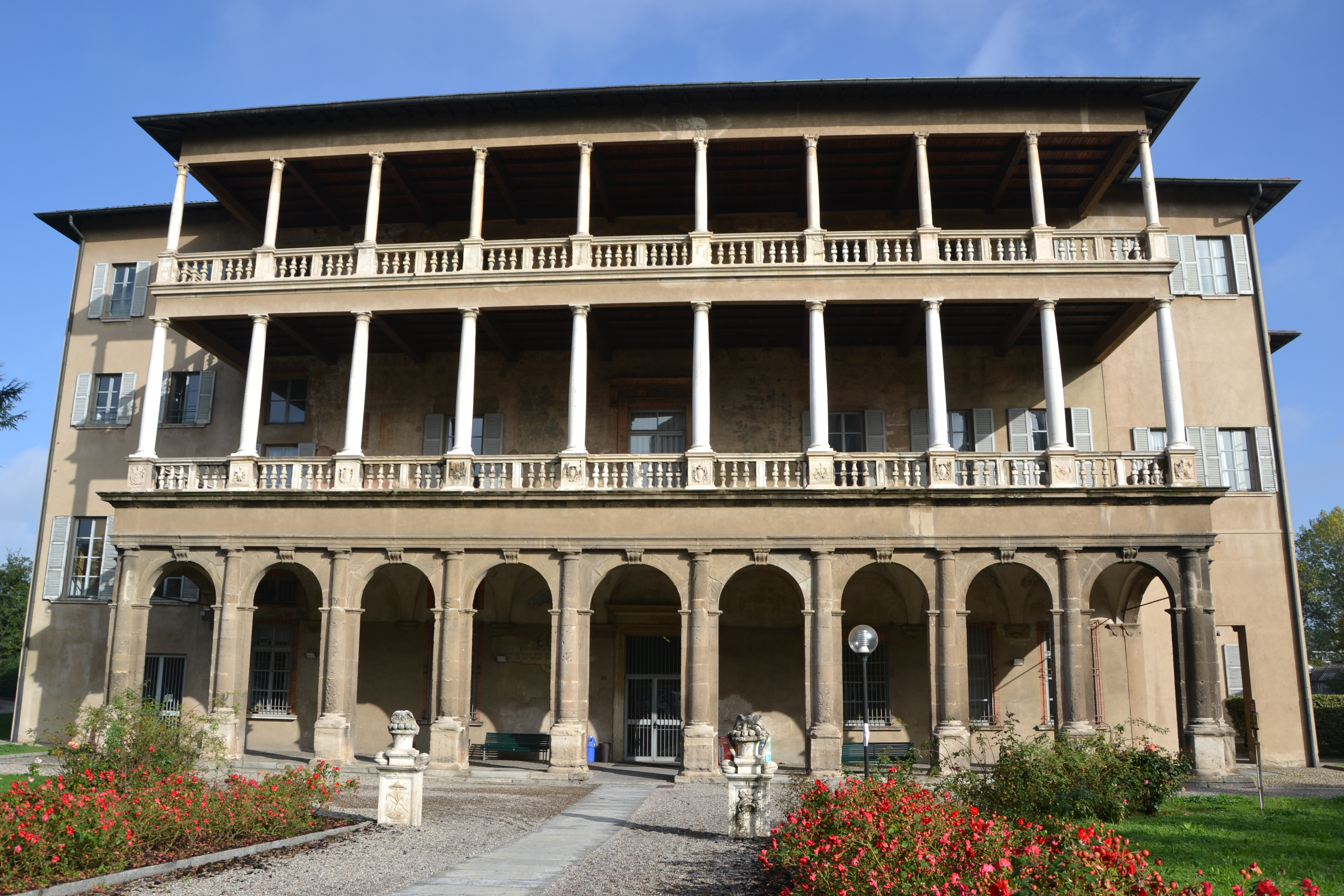
Loggia of Villa Simonetta

Another famous building site of the second half of the 16th century in Milan is the renovation of Villa Simonetta: it was purchased in 1547 by the governor of Milan Ferrante Gonzaga, who entrusted its restoration to various personalities including Domenico Giunti, to whom is owed the most scenic addition, namely the Palladian-inspired double loggia that anticipates the forms of Palazzo Chiericati. The classicism of the loggia would also serve as a reference for the forms of the courtyard of Fabio Mangone's Senate Palace. The 16th-century design was also responsible for the addition of the palace's two side wings to form a courtyard that overlooked the villa's private garden; inside there are fragments of frescoes by the Flemish artists who worked on the site. A characteristic element of the façade is the classical arcade surmounted by the double loggia: the arcade consists of nine pillars with lesenes of Tuscan order, an order taken up for the columns on the upper floor of the loggia, which take up the course of the lower lesenes, while on the top floor the columns are decorated with Corinthian capitals. There was no lack of references in the design to famous examples of suburban villas of the time: at the entrance to the garden from the palace there were two fishponds modeled after Giulio Romano's Palazzo del Te, while on the second floor there were trompe l'oeil columns set up as projections of those in the loggia with false windows and frescoes that have now completely disappeared, the overall layout of which took its cue from Perino del Vaga's Loggia of Heroes in the Genoese Villa del Principe.

In 1560 Pope Pius IV commissioned the Palazzo dei Giureconsulti in the space of the Piazza dei Mercanti for his hometown from Vincenzo Seregni; for the project the architect did not hide the similarities with the new forms of Alessi's Palazzo Marino, although the fifteenth-century reference with the open portico facade is included.

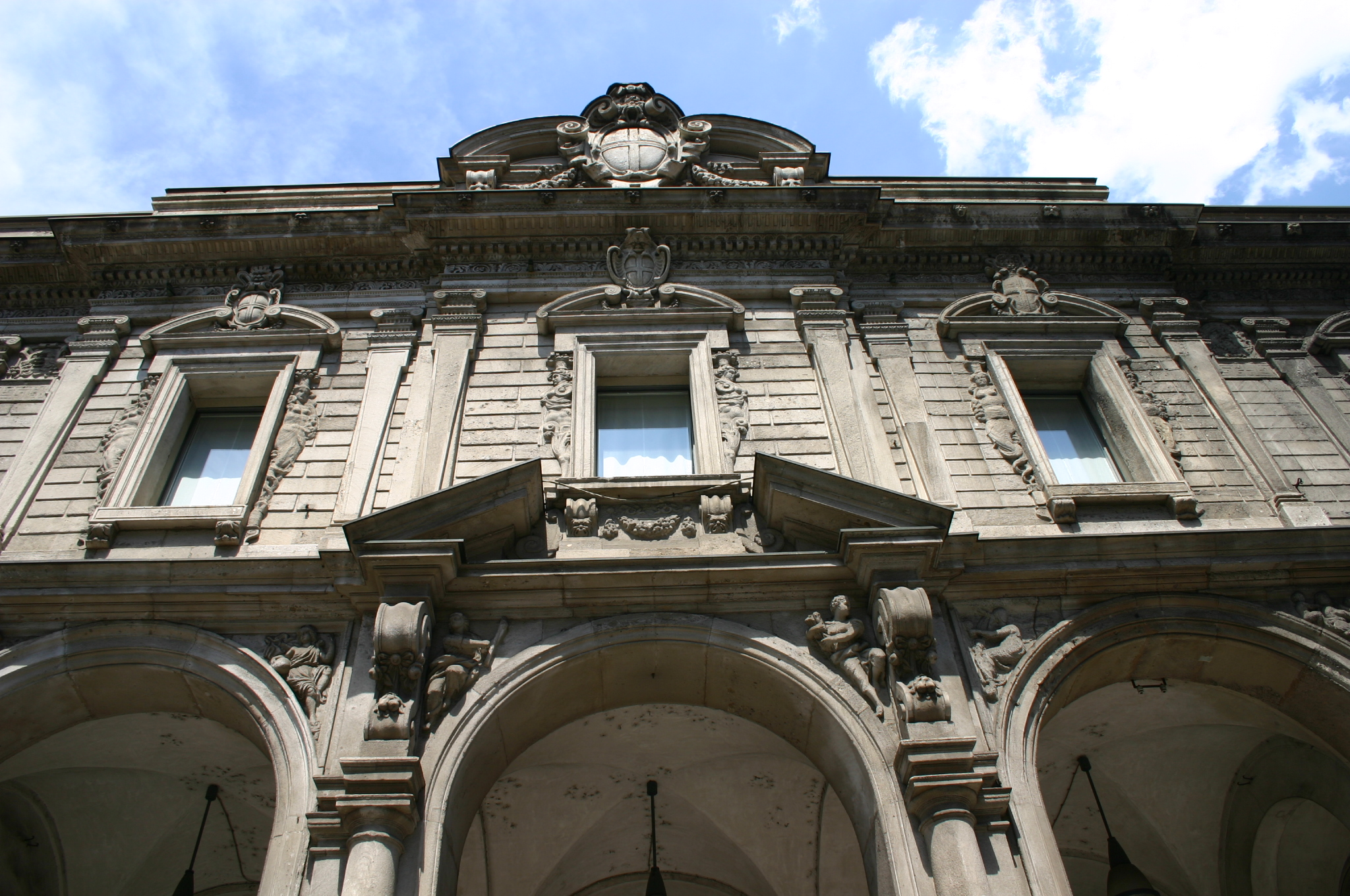
Decoration of the Palazzo dei Giureconsulti

Owed to Leone Leoni, a sculptor who improvised as an architect, is the Omenoni house, built by the artist to assert his prestige beginning in 1565, which, with its parade of eight atlantes, did not fail to attract the attention of many, including that of Vasari, who wrote as follows in his The Lives:

of beautiful architecture [...] perhaps the only one of its kind in Milan

The building is emblematic of the period and of the Milanese political situation: despite Borromeo's strict dispositions and the Church's numerous attempts to control public morals, a frieze depicting a faun emasculated by a lion, a clear intimidating signal to ill-intentioned people or enemies of the sculptor, was on display on the entrance door. The facade is also a good example of classicism with added mannerist elements. Thus, the first order of the facade is punctuated by eight caryatids, which are matched in the upper order by eight columns of Ionic order, which once ended on the cornice. The house moreover housed until the early seventeenth century a small private museum of Leoni, which contained among other works paintings by Titian, Correggio and Leonardo, a plaster cast of the equestrian statue of Marcus Aurelius and Leonardo Da Vinci's Atlantic Codex.

Among the most important interventions directly commissioned by Charles Borromeo is the Palazzo Arcivescovile, commissioned to Tibaldi starting in 1569. Despite Piermarini's neoclassical renovations, one can still observe the courtyard bordered by a loggia with a double row of round arches with ashlar pilasters and the Mannerist portal.

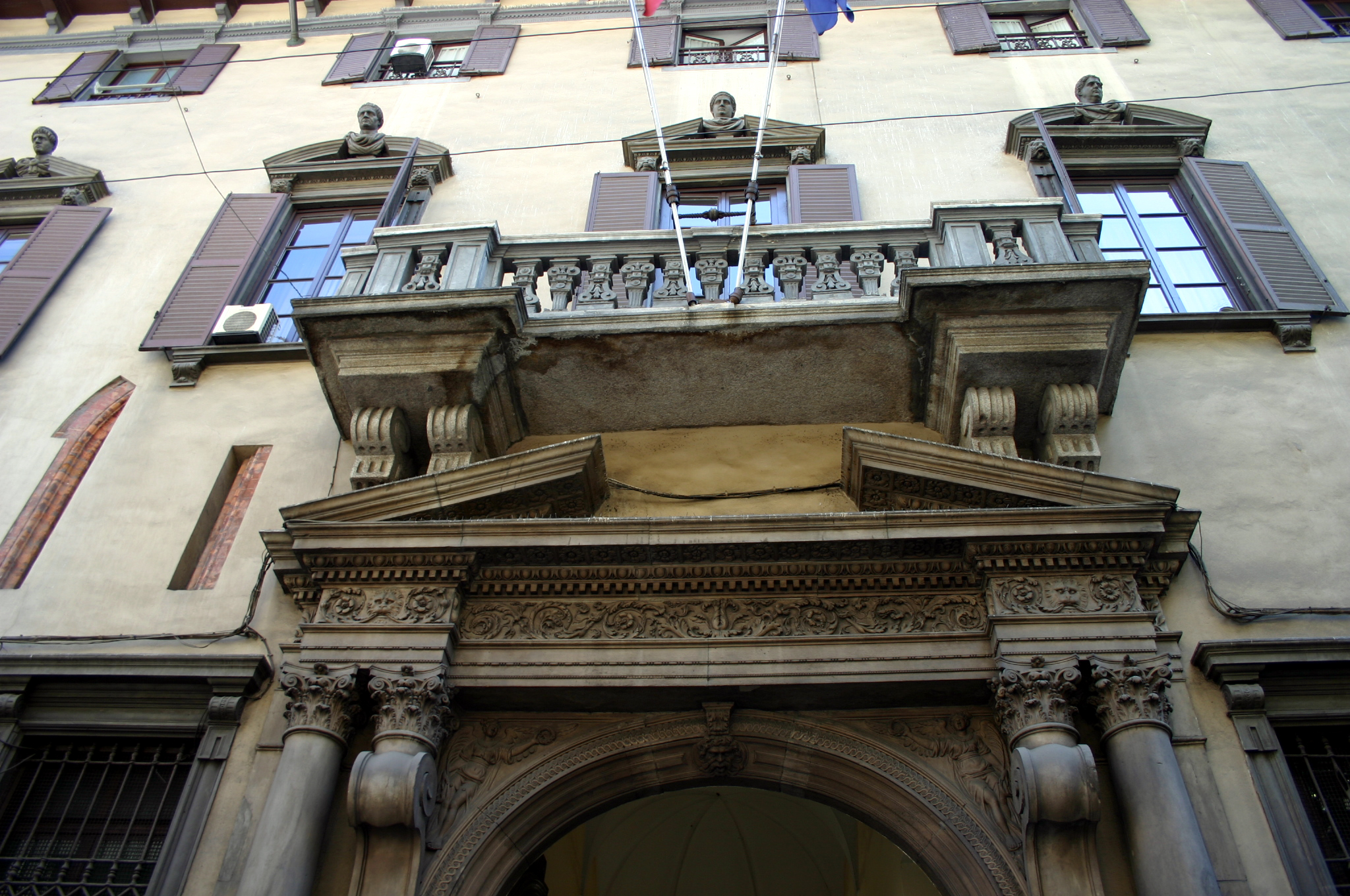
Portal and balcony of Palazzo Erba Odescalchi

Another civic palace of the period is Palazzo Erba Odescalchi, attributed to Tibaldi and his collaborators and built around 1570: a unique element in Milan is the ellipsoidal dome that traces the course of the hallway and the stairs, which are also elliptical, creating a singular illusion of height, even though the stairs serve only one floor to the user and the space seems dilated due to the perspective flattening of the ellipse; this solution would be reused in the years to come until Baroque architecture. Another anticipation of the Baroque theme is given by the elaborate portal with a broken tympanum supported by Corinthian order columns with double scroll corbels, which contrasts with the rest of the sober facade.

The only major public work conceived by the Spaniards was the remodeling of the Royal Palace, entrusted to Tibaldi and begun in 1574, a work that was, moreover, almost completely obliterated by the nineteenth-century neoclassical renovations. The work was highly articulated and covered much of the palace: Tibaldi also distinguished himself as a plasterer and painter, and his work earned him a commission to the more central and prestigious court in Madrid.

Also from the late sixteenth century is Palazzo Aliverti, much of it remodeled over the centuries: from the original period remains the porticoed courtyard with Ionic and Doric columns, coffered ceilings and interior frescoes attributed to the Campi brothers.

== Military architecture ==
Despite an all round thriving economy and a certain artistic vibrancy, Lombardy was regarded as a strategic military outpost, and as such most of the funds earmarked for the city were spent on the erection of a second set of walls. The city walls were begun in 1548 based on the design of engineer Giovanni Maria Olgiati: at its completion ten years later the walls ran in a pentagonal course for eleven kilometers, making it the largest European city walls of the time. The walls were organized into ten enceintes that roughly took the shape of a heart, hence the Milanese anecdote that the new walls were a romantic wedding gift to Queen Margaret of Austria, with walls reinforced at the corners of the Comasina and Vercellina gates.

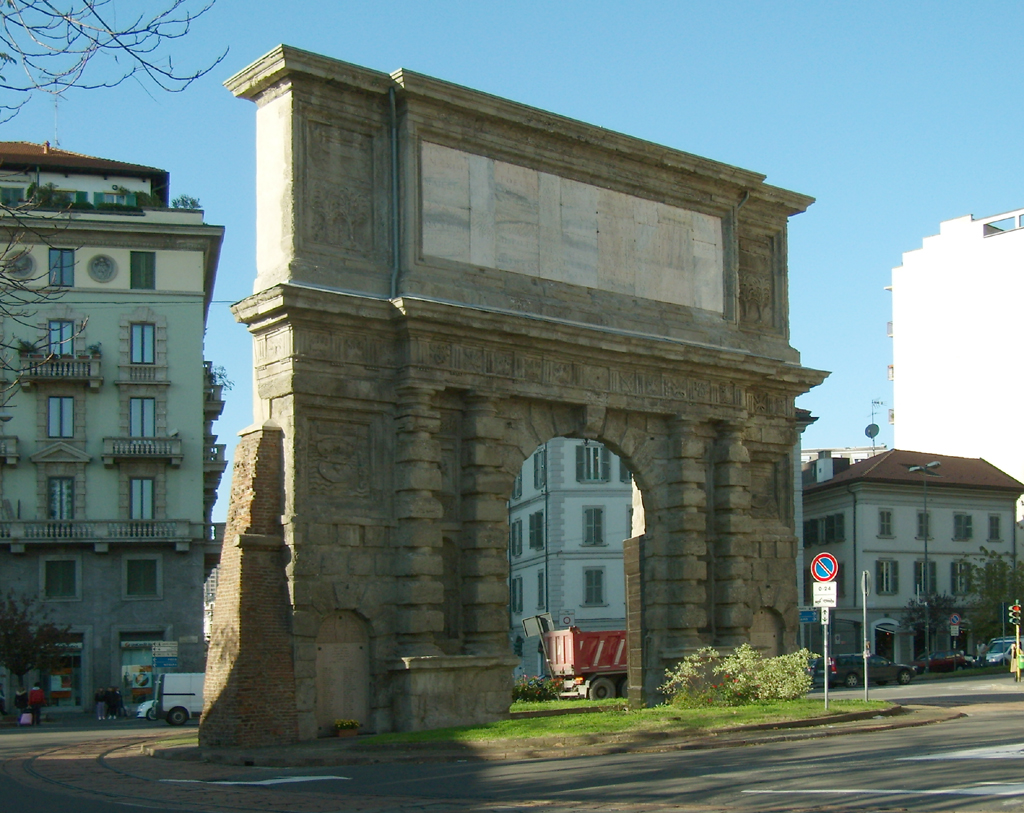
Front of Porta Romana towards the countryside

The building of the outer walls converging on the castle brought a number of consequences for the urban planning of the city: it was customary at the time to grant land outside the city free of charge to religious orders to build their headquarters there; with the incorporation of a large chunk of land within the city these privileges lapsed and the state was able to regain possession of vast tracts of land and end the validity of favors. Secondly, the construction of the fortified ramparts, the spaces near the perimeter wall were to be cleared to allow cannon fire and provide the necessary visibility, which prevented building near the new walls. In addition to the reorganization of the lands encompassed with the new walls, extensive reorganization of the canals passing through the lands once outside the city was necessary: this was done both for the purpose of supplying water for the moat of the new walls and so as not to disrupt the numerous canals and waterways necessary for the economy of the Milan area.

After the walls were built, it was decided in 1560 to reinforce the Sforza Castle by building a sort of citadel on the old Renaissance court. The project was entrusted to Giacomo Paleari and envisioned a design with a total of three walls, which would take the shape of a six-pointed star. The castle project was finished not without some modifications only in 1612 under the supervision of Gabrio Busca.

Along with the walls, a monumental entrance to the city was built to celebrate the passage to Milan of Margaret of Austria, future bride of Philip III, which was erected near the Bastions of Porta Romana. The Porta Romana arch, sometimes erroneously attributed to Martino Bassi, was designed by Aurelio Trezzi: its appearance is taken from second and third-century Roman arches, with a main opening and two at the minor sides, and from the Venetian military architecture of Sanmicheli. On the front facing the countryside, the major opening is bordered by two flat drafts ending on the entablature with carved metopes; on the sides are two bas-reliefs with shells and pearls, an allusion to the name Margaret from the Latin margarita, which indicated precisely the pearl. The door remained a model for temporary decorations in the duchy throughout the following century.

== Painting ==
Milanese painting in the second half of the 16th century saw collaboration between the local school linked to the late Lombard Renaissance and outside artists, especially from Cremona, who would greatly influence the future Milanese painting scene. A religiously oriented painting, strongly controlled by St. Charles, is thus counterbalanced by a strong naturalistic component, which precisely because of the strong control of the ecclesiastical authority could not fully develop. Caravaggio, the greatest exponent of Lombard naturalism, had greater fortune outside the borders of the duchy.

The simultaneous presence of artists from different traditions of central northern Italy was fundamental in the formation of Caravaggio, who was able to take advantage of a master from a Venetian school mitigated by Counter-Reformation painting, contact with Cremonese artists who were importers of a tradition linked to the Emilian school, and finally a Lombard school of Leonardo's heritage more or less influenced by trips to update on the models of central Italian Mannerism.

=== Local school ===
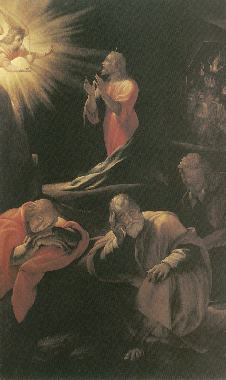
Giovanni Paolo Lomazzo, Oration of Christ in the Garden (16th century), church of San Carlo al Corso

Among the greatest interpreters of the Milanese school is Giovanni Paolo Lomazzo: trained in the workshop of Giovan Battista della Cerva, himself a pupil of Gaudenzio Ferrari, he began his learning by studying the models, in addition to Ferrari, of Bernardino Luini. To his training in Lombard Renaissance models, Lomazzo enriched his education with a trip to central Italy, where he was confronted with Tibaldi and the works of Michelangelo; from this trip of his he drew his style, which blends the Lombard tradition, mainly Gaudenzian, with a Central Italian Mannerist language. While his early works are largely lost, his vast output is not available, however, due to the illness that led to his blindness within a few years: among his canvases is the Crucifixion (1570) for the church of San Giovanni in Conca, commented on by the painter himself in one of his treatises for the rendering of color and the particular luministic modulation; nevertheless to be considered Lomazzo's greatest work is the cycle of frescoes at the Foppa Chapel.

The work in the Foppa Chapel in the Church of San Marco, which include the Angelic Glory in the apse basin, the Fall of Simon Magus on the left wall, a lost St. Paul resurrecting Eutychus on the right wall, and the Madonna and Child altarpiece represent a summation of the painter's attempt at the recovery of the Lombard Leonardesque tradition. The pictorial scheme is a clear reference to the dome of Gaudenzio Ferrari's Sanctuary of the Blessed Virgin of Miracles in Saronno, with Leonardo da Vinci's characterization of the characters; finally, the choice of themes in the work indicates an anti-heretical and counter-reformed choice of the painter. The importance of Lomazzo's work is evidenced by the numerous repropositions of the work's scheme, including those by Carlo Urbino or Ottavio Semino.

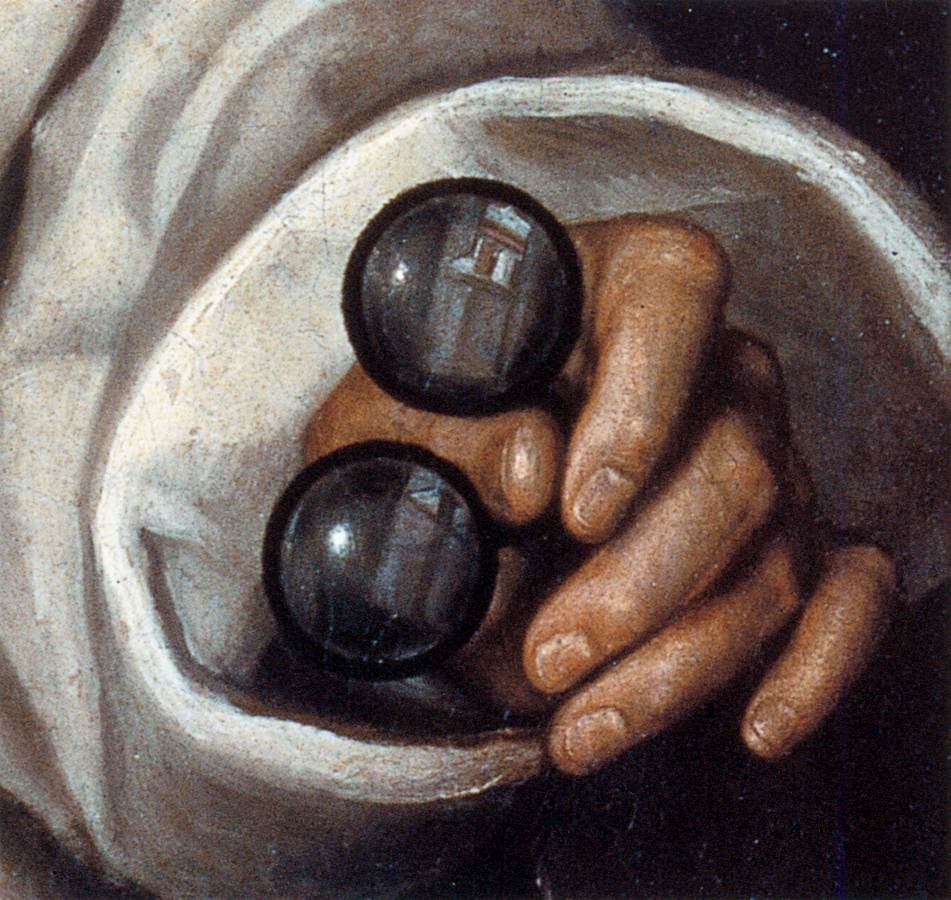
Fede Galizia - Portrait of Paolo Morigia (detail of the glasses)

Of significance in the last years of his career is the canvas of the Oration of Christ in the Garden for the church of Santa Maria dei Servi, in which the painter's change of register is evident. While the work shows a characterization of the characters typical of the early Milanese Leonardesque painters, one notices a chromatic play of light and shadow given by the nocturnal setting taken from Correggio and Albrecht Dürer, also similar to the work of the Campi brothers in the church of San Paolo Converso.

After the completion of his most important work, Lomazzo gradually lost his sight until he became blind due to the progression of an eye disease: this prevented him from continuing his career as a painter, though it did allow him to devote himself to various literary works including the essay of the Idea of the Temple of Painting, that is, a compendium on painting in the footsteps of Vasari's work. Among the conclusions Lomazzo draws in his work is the use of "various manners" to achieve a perfect style, praising Michelangelo's drawing, Titian's and Correggio's color, and Raphael's proportions: precisely from the painters to achieve the right manner comes the comparison of painting to a temple, held up by seven governors as columns to support it: in addition to the artists just mentioned are Leonardo, Polidoro da Caravaggio, Mantegna and Gaudenzio Ferrari. The author also gives a judgment on the noblest type of painting, considering the fresco as the most valuable work, and compares the painter's work to the work of divine creation.

Lomazzo then goes beyond a guide on painting to blur into almost philosophical aspects, judging painting as the only source of knowledge of the "beauty of all things," from which he then derives an inventory of the things in which beauty would be formed, from "women and children" to "dragons and monsters," commenting on the most disparate details, such as "the shadow under the fish." Finally, the text concludes with a commentary on the wonder-rooms, the trend of the time, symbolic with their variety and inventiveness of the art of the time.

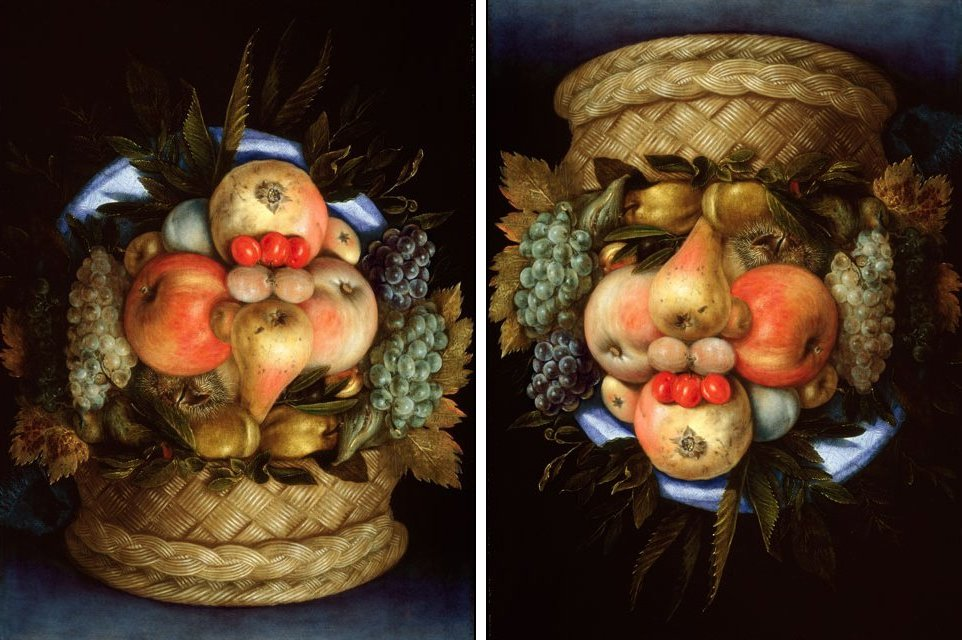
Giuseppe Arcimboldo, The Fruit Basket (c. 1590), private collection

Famous for his bizarre compositions, Giuseppe Arcimboldi, commonly known as l'Arcimboldo, trained in his father's workshop and began his painting career as a cartoonist for the stained glass windows of Milan Cathedral. By 1562 he had enough of a reputation to be called to the Prague court of Rudolf II, where he carried on his particular style on the themes of his works and worked as a consultant for the emperor's cabinet of curiosities; he did not return to Milan until 1582, where he continued his painting activities while maintaining close contacts with the Prague court. The style of Arcimboldo's portraits, executed by means of the composition of fruit and vegetables to give anthropomorphic elements, was among the most distinctive of the period, and his style was often imitated: in the past it was sometimes difficult to identify with certainty the painter's autograph works as many were in the painter's style. Among the most famous works are The Four Seasons, The Four Elements, and Vertumnus. Decidedly peculiar, however, are The Gardener and The Fruit Basket, part of a series of works that, depending on whether or not the painting is arranged upside down, take on the appearance of a portrait or a simple still life.

Giovanni Ambrogio Figino was a pupil of Lomazzo, but he finished his training on a trip between Genoa and Rome, where he focused his studies in particular on Michelangelo and Raphael: this Roman sojourn decisively influenced his style far more than he had with his master. Having lost many of his early works, the painter's canvases of St. Mark and St. Parolo for the church of San Raffaele and the Madonna and the Serpent for the church of San Fedele, which inspired Caravaggio for the same subject, can be traced back to the painter's youth. The painter's fame came in the late 1580s, however, with the canvases of Madonna and Child with Saints John the Evangelist and Michael the Archangel (1588) for the College of Jurisconsults and Saint Ambrose on Horseback (1590) for the chapel of the tribunal of the Provision. Figino also tried his hand at portraiture, of which his portrait of Lucio Foppa, also described by chronicles of the time for its attention to the details of the painting's objects such as the reflections of the armor and the particular rendering of the lacework, is remembered. At the height of his fame, in the late sixteenth and early seventeenth centuries, he was called to the court of the Savoy family to paint the Grand Gallery of the Royal Palace of Turin.

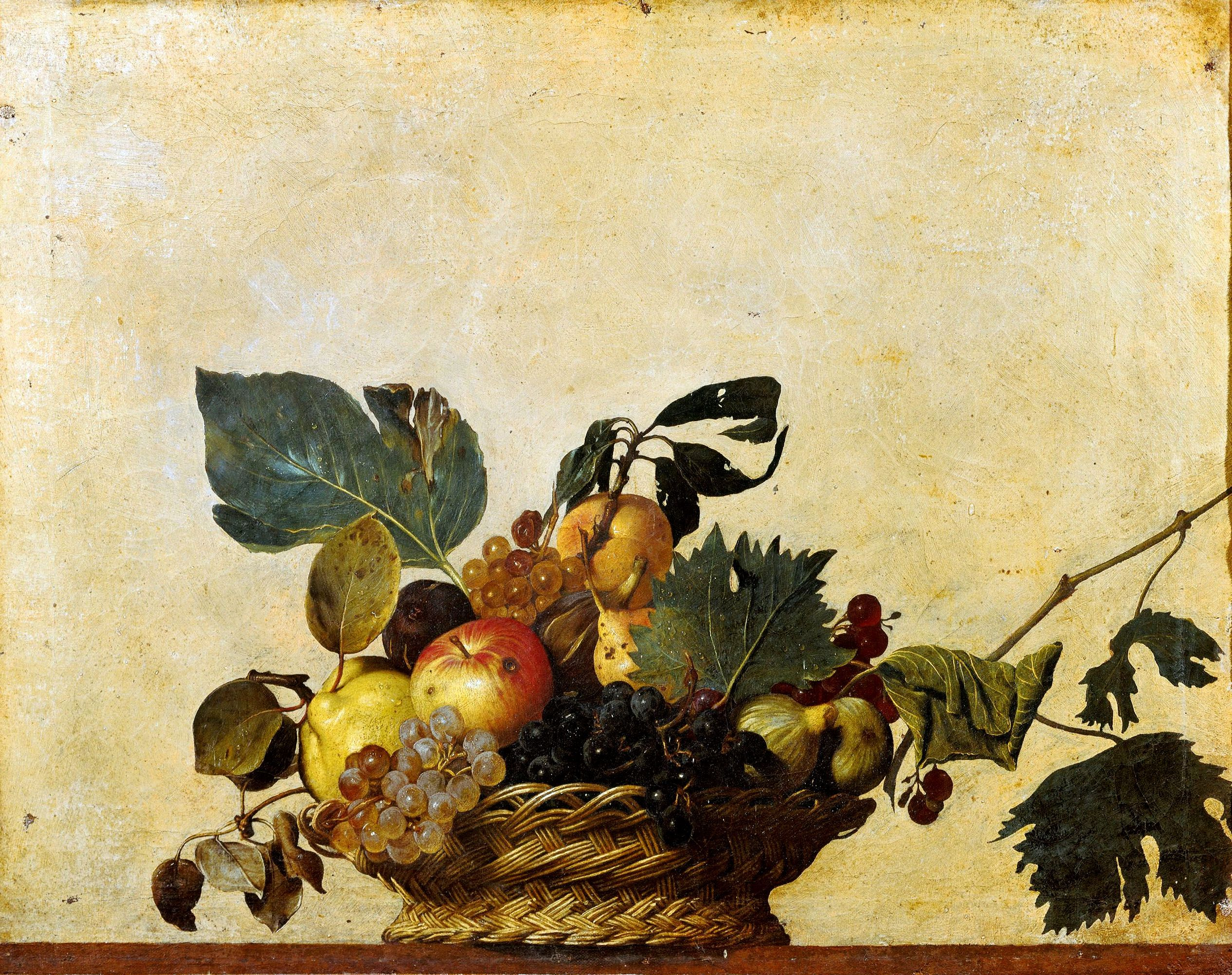
Caravaggio, Basket of Fruit (1599), Pinacoteca Ambrosiana, Milan

Special mention must be made of Aurelio Luini, son of the more famous Bernardino from whom he inherited the workshop and commissions for the church of San Maurizio al Monastero Maggiore, in which from 1555 he signed the frescoes of the Stories of the Flood, some lunettes of the apse wall and especially the Adoration of the Magi for the counter façade, in which the painter already shows a style of language full of tension and inspired by Leonardo's drawings that place Aurelio Luini among the heirs of the Milanese Leonardesque painters along with Lomazzo. He was, however, inhibited from painting in the city by Archbishop Borromeo for reasons that were never fully clarified until the latter's death. Among his most famous last works is the altarpiece for Milan Cathedral of Santa Tecla in which emerges a high compositional tension already seen in the Martyrdom of Saint Vincent for the church of San Vincenzo alle Monache, a painting style that is thought to have been at the basis of his enmity with Cardinal Borromeo.

As for the still life theme, it is found in Milan and, more generally, in Lombardy, one of its first places of diffusion, favored among other things by Leonardo's legacy. Among the earliest producers of still lifes include the Milanese Ambrogio Figino, Fede Galizia, and the Cremonese Panfilo Nuvolone: in this early period, still lifes were often painted in a melancholic view of a passing beauty and a nature corruptible by the passage of time; however, there was no lack of symbolic or mystical references, a symptom of a residual ecclesiastical control over art. Caravaggio, who was so inspired by the naturalism of the Lombard tradition, did not remain entirely uninvolved in this phenomenon, trying his hand at the Basket of Fruit, the painter's only independent still life.

=== External schools ===
The school most present in Milan after the local one was certainly the Cremonese school of artists, then in a period of prosperity because of the construction sites of Cremona Cathedral. The two schools, moreover, often came into conflict, most notably in 1563 when the Milanese Giuseppe Meda and Giuseppe Arcimboldo confronted the Cremonese Bernardino Campi and Carlo Urbino in a competition for the design of the gonfalon of Milan, and in 1564 again between Meda and the brothers Bernardino, Antonio and Giulio Campi in a competition for the designs of the panels of the organ of the Milan cathedral, both won by the Milanese artists.

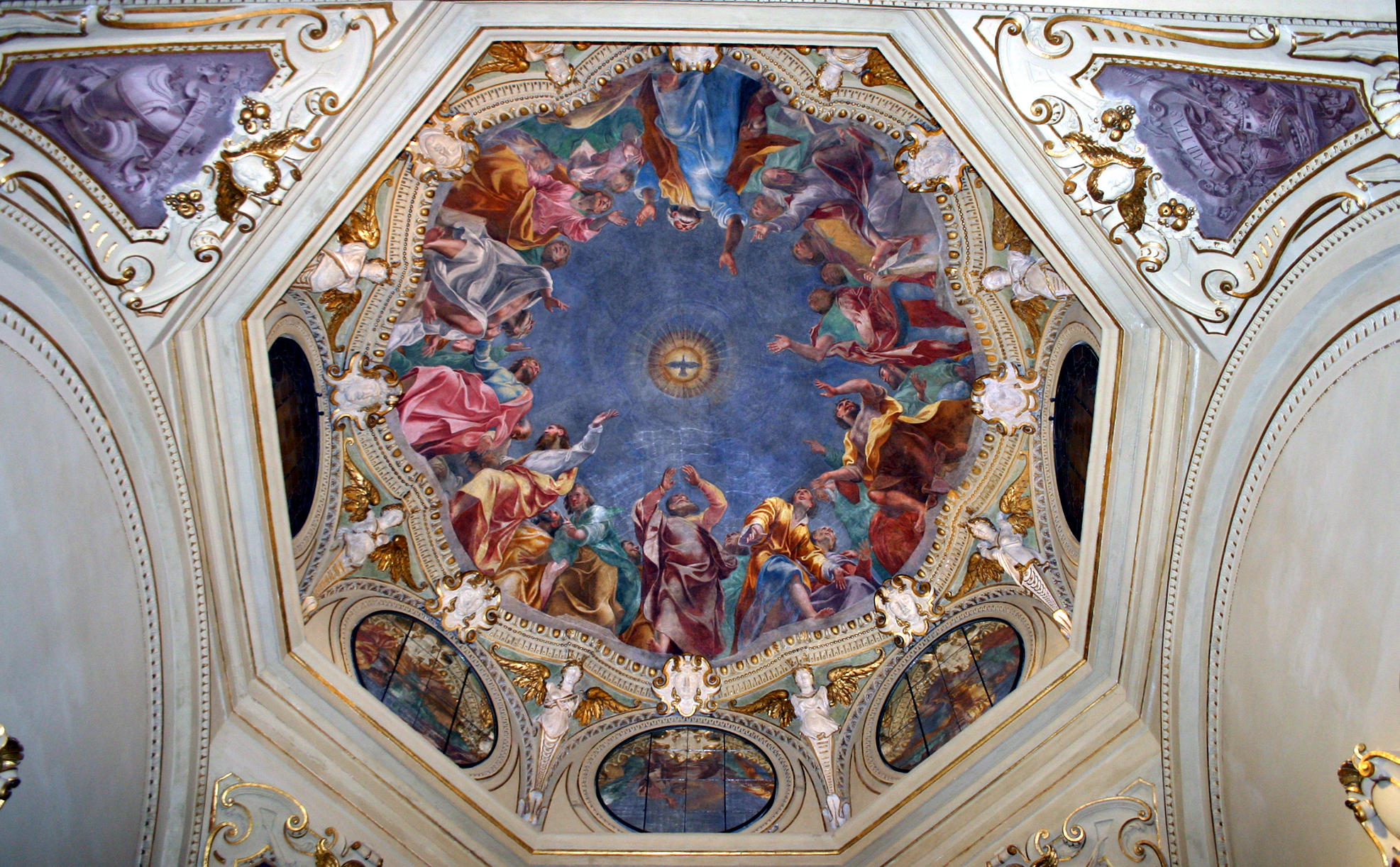
Carlo Urbino - Pentecost (16th cent.), Chapel of San Giuseppe, Church of San Marco

The first to arrive in Milan was Bernardino Campi in 1550, summoned by Governor Ferrante Gonzaga, who commissioned him to paint a series of portraits of his daughter Ippolita because of his reputation as a portrait painter, which was followed by a large number of commissions from the entire Milanese nobility. Campi introduced into the Milanese art scene a painting inspired by the style of Parmigianino, in clear antithesis to the painting of Leonardo's and Gaudenzian heritage until then in vogue in the city, also with the help of many assistants including Carlo Urbino: while Campi's painting was decidedly refined and elegant, the painter lacked an equally high degree of creativity in models and solutions, so he often resorted to the help of Urbino, a skilled painter as well as an excellent composer of themes and models for the most varied works. Bernardino Campi's fame increased over the next two decades to such an extent that the work commissioned from him was so numerous that he had some of them executed directly by his collaborator Urbino: a perfect example of this is the altarpiece of the Madonna and Child with Saints (1565) for the church of Sant'Antonio Abate, signed and painted by Campi, of which preparatory models by Carlo Urbino are available.

In addition to this prolific collaboration Carlo Urbino also painted on his own, trying his hand at pictorial works more in the Lombard tradition, such as the Pentecost for the chapel of St. Joseph in the church of San Marco, which takes up the scheme of Lomazzo's Angelic Glory painted in the same church in the Foppa chapel: however, his collaboration with Bernardino Campi and his later solo works contributed to the introduction in Milan of a mannerism more attentive to Emilian and Central Italian traditions that marked the definitive entry of "foreign" commissions into the Milanese nobility. In this sense Carlo Urbino worked between 1557 and 1566 in the decoration of the church of Santa Maria presso San Celso and for canvases commissioned by Isabella Borromeo.

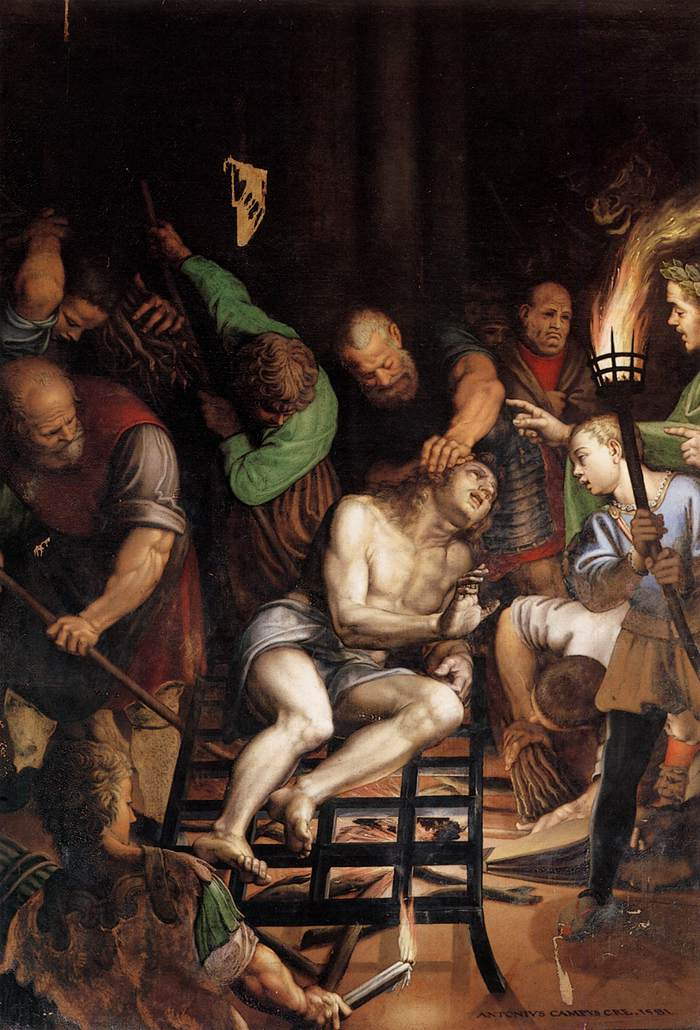
Antonio Campi - Martyrdom of St. Lawrence (1581), Church of San Paolo Converso

The fame that Bernardino Campi had achieved fostered the arrival in Milan of other protagonists of the Cremonese school, including the brothers Giulio Campi, for a Crucifixion (1560) in the church of Santa Maria della Passione, and Antonio Campi with the canvas of the Resurrection of Christ(1560) for the church of Santa Maria presso San Celso, where the combination of perspective illusionism and luminism later echoed in the works of the Stories of St. Paul for the church of the same name, where the two brothers collaborated, is noticeable: among the most significant achievements of the cycle are the Conversion of St. Paul (1564) in which Antonio Campi was inspired for the characters in the background by Giulio Romano's work in the Sala di Troia in the Ducal Palace in Mantua, and the Beheading of the Baptist (1571), which for its poor setting and the luministic effect of the torch that interrupts the darkness of the scene in the central group did not fail to influence the young Caravaggio. In the church of Sant'Angelo, also by Antonio Campi, are the canvases Martyrdom of St. Catherine (1583) and St. Catherine in the Prison Visited by the Empress Faustina (1584), painted in dark surroundings with the presence of multiple light sources, through which Campi tried his hand at a skillful play of chiaroscuro from which Caravaggio would learn so much in his use of the "grazing light" effect. Finally, in the church of San Paolo Converso there is Antonio Campi's major achievement, with the collaboration of his brother Vincenzo, of the fresco decoration of the vault with the Assumption of Jesus (1586-1589) in which the brothers tried their hand at a rare example of quadraturistic illusionism inspired by Giulio Romano's Mantuan solutions, in which the adherence to the perspective treatise of Jacopo Barozzi da Vignola's Two Rules of Practical Perspective is noted: the church, governed by nuns from the Cremonese Sfondrati family, was instrumental in breaking the Milanese school's closure to other influences, entrusting almost all commissions to Cremonese artists.

Despite the heated rivalry between the Cremonese and Milanese schools, the Cremonese painters and in particular the Campi brothers did not fail to influence Milanese art in the years to come perhaps even more than they influenced Cremonese painting itself. The training of the two younger brothers took place in the workshop of their brother Giulio, a follower of a Raphaelism of the Emilian school: Antonio Campi, on the other hand, would import to the city a painting influenced not only by his brother's style but also by a focus on the models of Camillo Boccaccino and Parmigianino.

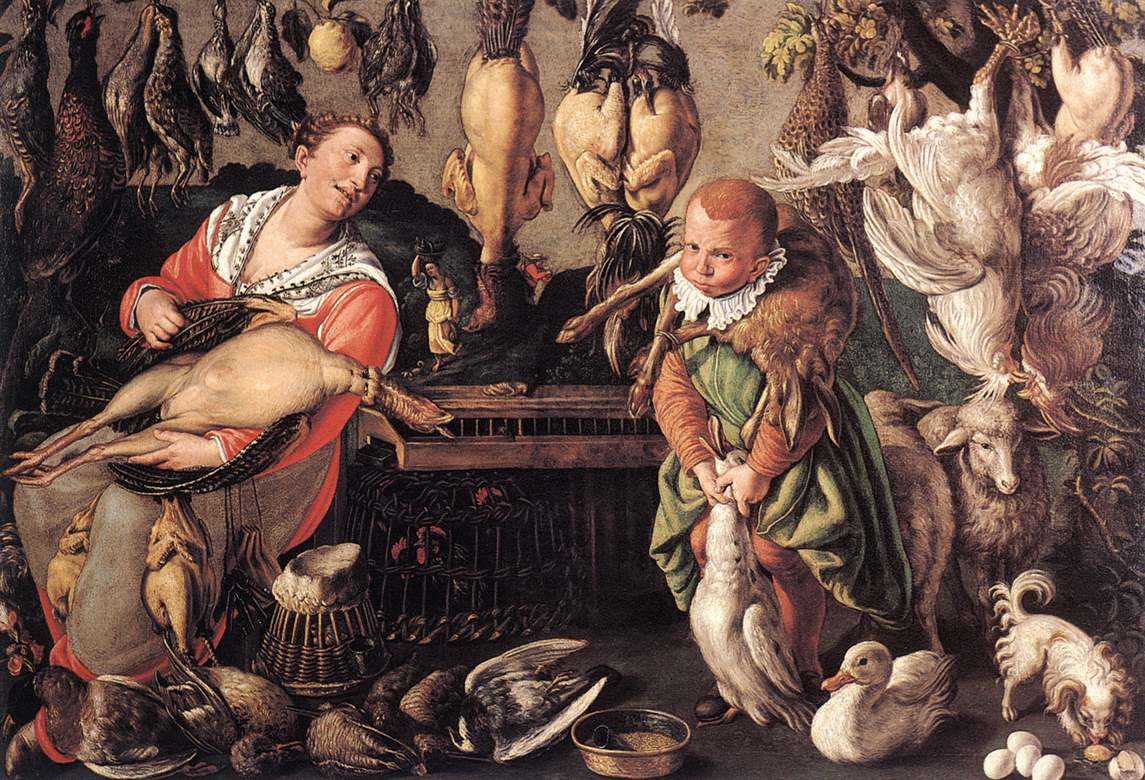
Vincenzo Campi - Poulterers (c. 1580), Pinacoteca di Brera, Milan

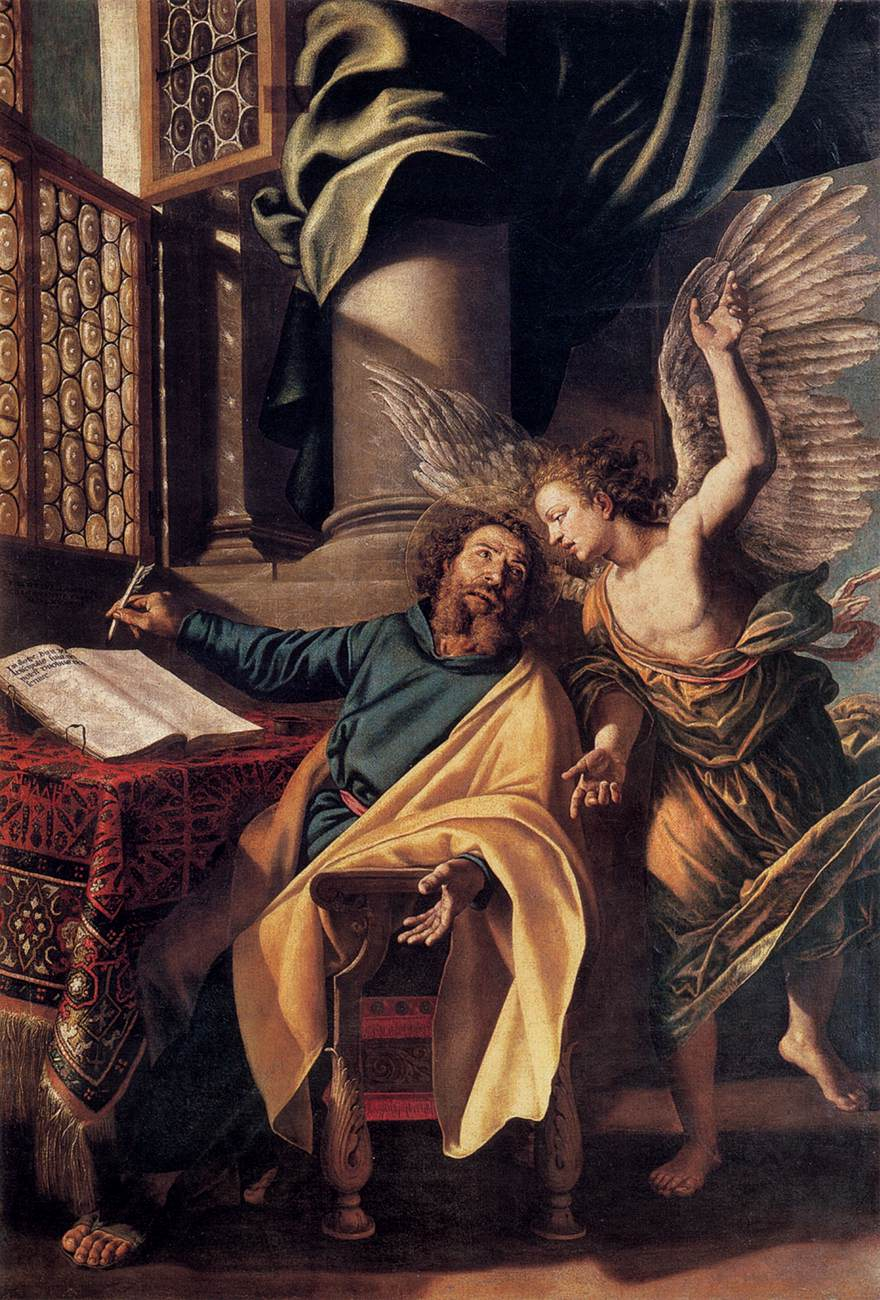
Vincenzo Campi, St. Matthew, Pavia, San Francesco.

Vincenzo Campi, the youngest of the three brothers, was the one who developed the most distinctive style of them all: the casual use of luministic effects and a greater focus on naturalistic painting sometimes led him to be labeled an exponent of "pre-Caravaggism." In addition to his fruitful collaborations with his brothers, Vincenzo is also known for trying his hand at genre painting, as in the works of Fishmongers or Poulterers, which combines a painting inspired by the Flemish tradition of Pieter Aertsen and Joachim Beuckelaer with an attention to every detail of the scene typical of Lombard naturalism.

The Cremasque artist Giovanni da Monte, though linked to the Cremonese school, made his debut in Milan in the church of Santa Maria presso San Celso on his return from a stay in Vilnius and Venice with the work of the Resurrection of Christ, later passed on to the Campi brothers. Trying his hand at various activities such as designs for temporary decorations, he is remembered in Milan for the organ panels of the Basilica of San Nazaro with Saints Nazaro and Celso in which he blends all the Nordic, Venetian and Lombard elements learned in his experience as a painter.

Of the Venetian school, on the other hand, was Simone Peterzano, who made his debut in Milan in the decoration of the church of San Maurizio al Monastero Maggiore and for some canvases for the church of San Barnaba, in which his early style from training on the Venetian models of Tintoretto, Veronese and Titian, his master, is still evident. Upon his arrival in Milan he immediately showed adherence to the models of painting mitigated according to the spirit of the Counter-Reformation, as in the cycle for the apse of the Garegnano Charterhouse where the commissioning friars specified both the subjects and the manner of painting, or in the Deposition now in the church of San Fedele, where the Venetian painter also shows some adherence to models of naturalism typical of Savoldo: Peterzano is also famous for having been the master of Caravaggio, who moreover exploited the master's Deposition in the drafting of the same subject now in the Pinacoteca Vaticana. Involvement in the spread of Counter-Reformation art is also evidenced by his collaborations with Pellegrino Tibaldi, a favorite artist of Borromeo.

Ottavio Semino, a painter of Genoese origin, before arriving in Milan to execute the decorations of the Marino Palace trained on the Genoese background of Perino del Vaga, Giulio Romano and Raphael, whom he studied on a trip to Rome. After the decoration of the Marino Palace, where he arrived through the call of his fellow citizen who commissioned the palace, he obtained various commissions including fresco cycles for the chapel of San Gerolamo and for the Brasca chapel in the church of Sant'Angelo: in the contract for the work in the last chapel it was specified how the result should be at least equal to those of Giovanni Paolo Lomazzo in the Foppa chapel in San Marco. Although at the time Ottavio Semino was considered among the best painters on the Milanese scene, contemporary critics instead judge the work as disappointing and predictable because of its obsessive adherence to Raphaelesque models: nevertheless, due to this reputation, Semino obtained many commissions, including the frescoes of the Stories of St. John the Baptist in the church of Santa Maria delle Grazie.

== Decorative arts ==
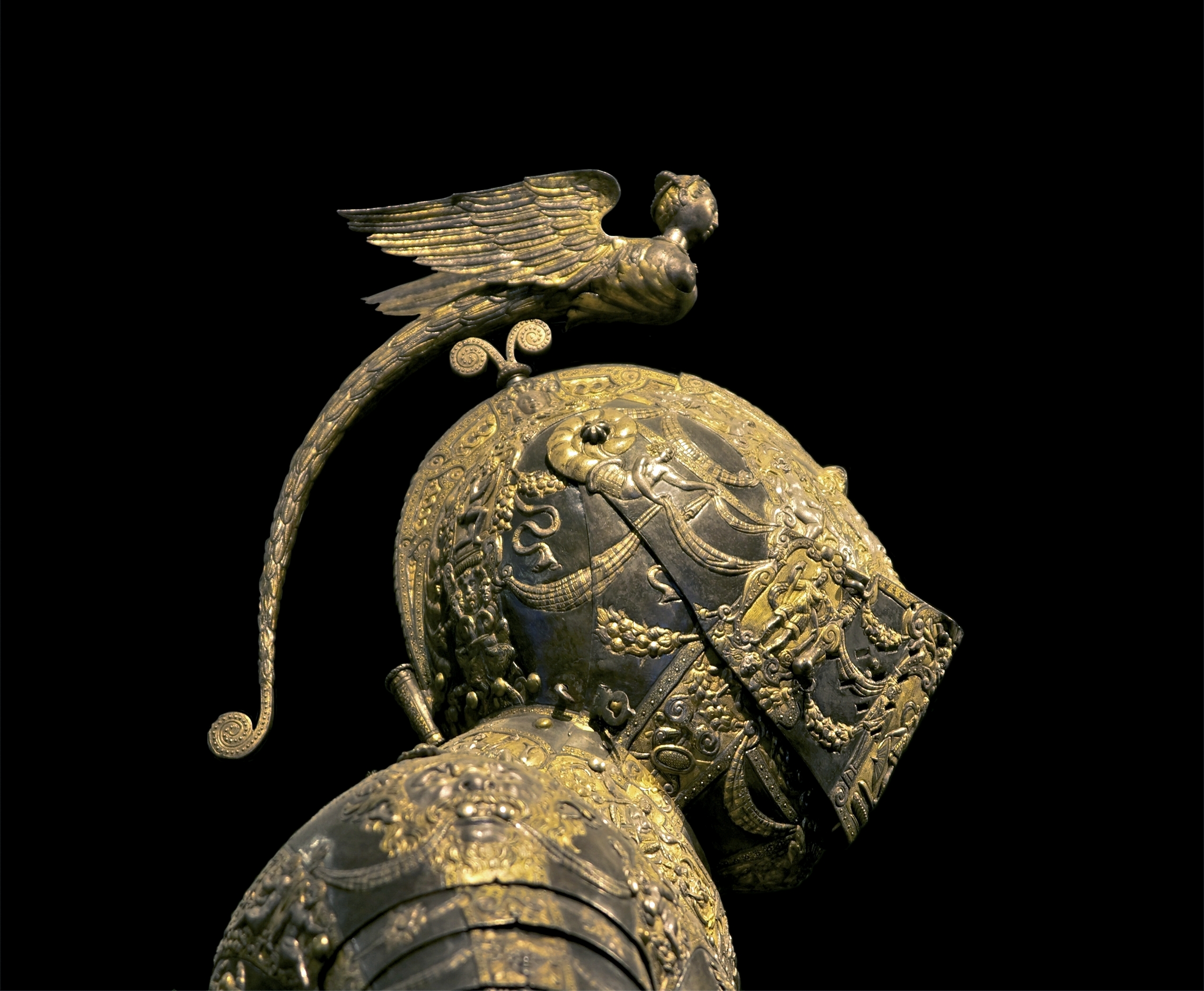
Lucio Marliani known as the Piccinino, Parade Armor of the Duke of Parma and Piacenza, Kunsthistorisches Museum, Vienna

Already in the early Renaissance, Milanese craftsmen were among the most highly regarded in Europe, yet the heyday of the decorative arts in the city came during the early Spanish rule. One of the leading areas of Milanese craftsmanship was armor manufacturing, the workmanship of which far exceeded that of other European manufactures. The fame of the Milanese armorers was such that their work was considered a real status symbol among nobles throughout Europe, despite the fact that other foreign states had established their own workshops, such as in Innsbruck, Augsburg or Greenwich; among the best craftsmen of the late sixteenth century are mentioned above all Lucio Marliani, known as the Piccinino, and Giovanni Battista Panzeri, known as the Zarabaglia, both belonging to well-known families of armorers.

More generally, the products of Milanese craftsmanship of the time supplied many wonder-rooms of European rulers with luxury objects of various kinds. By the 1930s, the production of cameos, the carving of precious stones, and the working of rock crystal was well established: the products were table vessels, tableware, cups, amphorae, and liturgical objects, in addition to the aforementioned cameos and carvings. These objects, like armor, were also considered to be of the highest quality: it was not uncommon for major noble families or European courts to commission works from Milanese workshops to give as gifts to sovereigns, relatives or friends.

The initiators of this tradition were the brothers Gaspare and Gerolamo Miseroni, who with their workshop were the suppliers, starting in the second half of the sixteenth century, of Maximilian II of Habsburg, Cosimo I de' Medici and the Gonzagas.

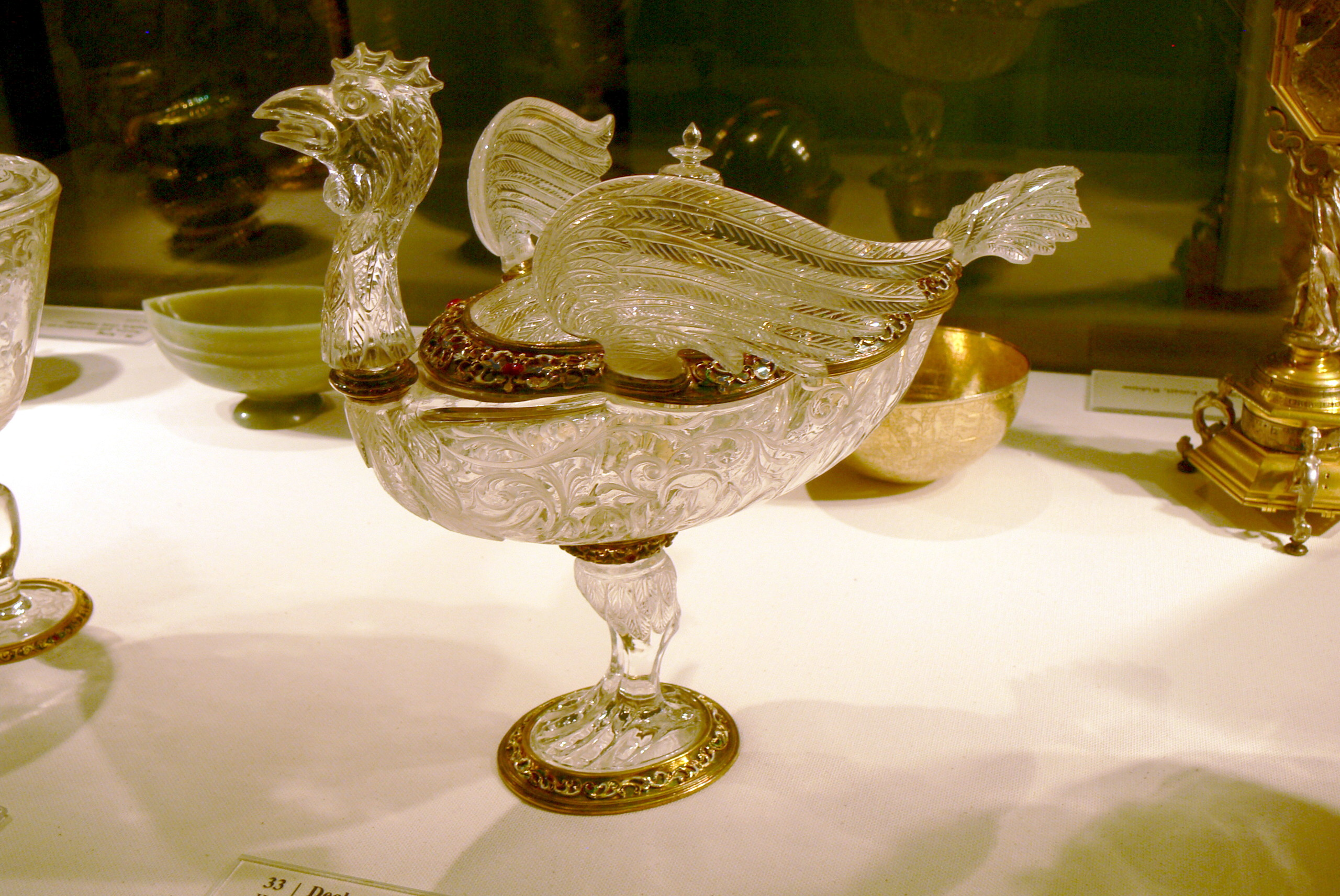
Milanese workshop, Crystal chalice in the shape of a rooster, Treasury of the Teutonic Order, Vienna

The Miseroni workshop is credited with many portraits on crystal medallions in the collection of Rudolf II of Habsburg, including those of Ottavio Miseroni, inventor moreover of the technique of "commesso" on cameos, who by virtue of the emperor's many commissions implanted a workshop in Prague.

Another famous family of carvers was the Scala family: starting in the seventies it had among its main patrons the Dukes of Bavaria starting with Albert V of Bavaria, the Gonzagas, and the Savoy. Among the family's various works is mentioned in Pompeo Leoni's will a crystal globe sixty centimeters in diameter engraved with the outline of the Kingdom of Spain and gold decorations, executed for William V of Bavaria. Within the vast collection of the Dukes of Bavaria are also many works by Annibale Fontana from which Scala sometimes drew inspiration, such as the box for Albert V with crystal plates engraved with stories from the Old Testament and decorated with precious stones such as lapis lazuli, rubies and emeralds, as well as gold enamels. Fontana is also credited with works exclusively in crystal such as the vase with the Stories of Jason (Treasury of the Residence, Munich) and the vase with Stories of Proserpine (Kunsthistorisches Museum, Vienna).

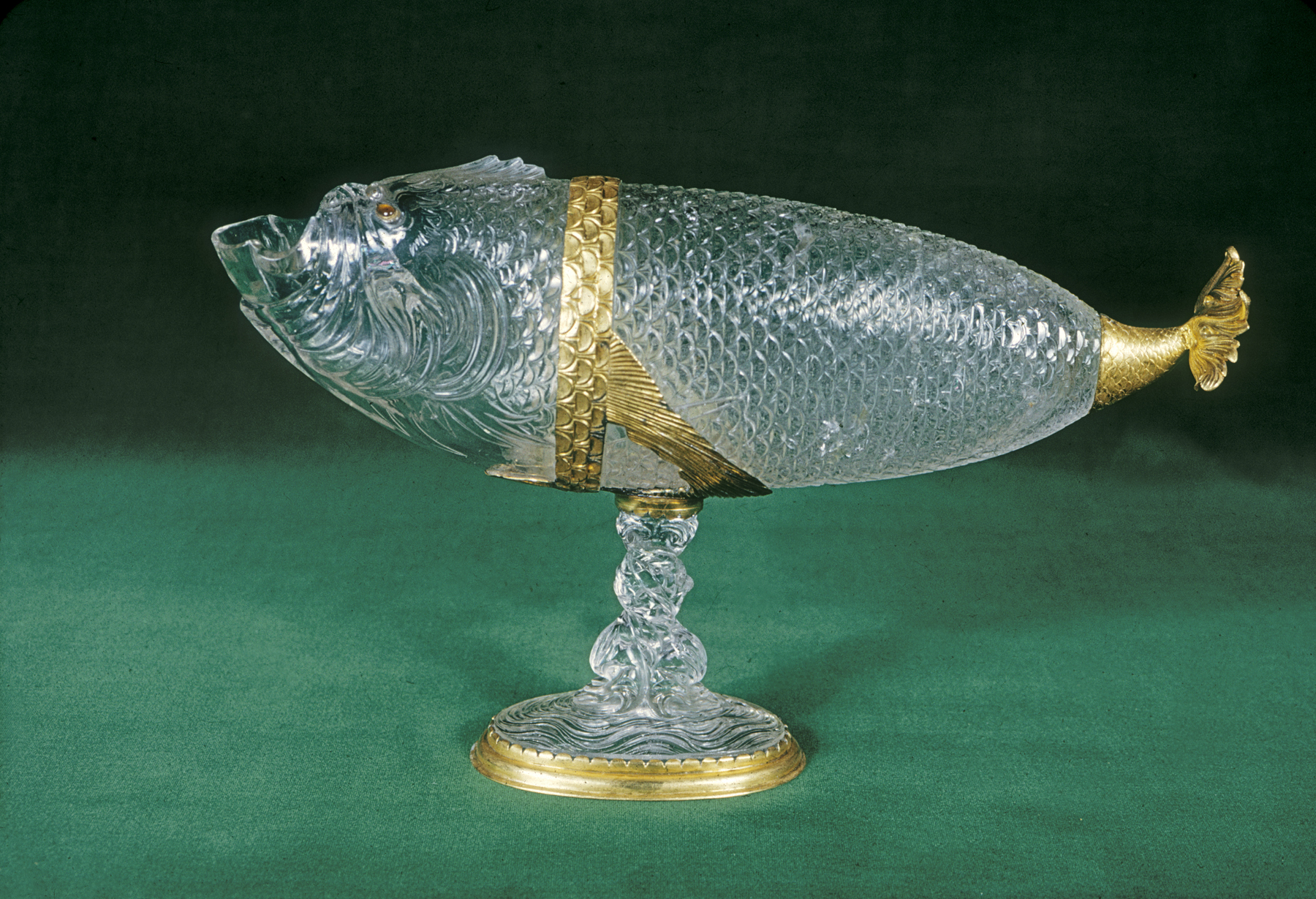
Saracchi workshop, Fish-shaped vase, Walters Art Museum, Baltimore

To the Milanese families of artists must be added the Saracchi workshop, which moreover took possession of Annibale Fontana's designs because of his marriage to Ippolita Saracchi, sister of the workshop founders. Particularly active for the commissions of Albert II of Bavaria, the Saracchi devoted themselves especially to tableware, in addition to the canonical glyptic art: among the most famous examples include the Galera da tavola with carved stories from the biblical and classical tradition ("Treasure of the Residence," Munich) or the Fontana da tavola in crystal, enameled gold, gems and cameos, commissioned for the wedding of Ferdinando I de' Medici to Christina of Lorraine (Museo degli Argenti, Florence). Particularly prized for their work in crystal and semi-precious stones, the Saracchi had occasion to try their hand in the most unusual fields, such as in the zoomorphic jasper vases for the Gonzagas: other patrons included Philip II of Spain, Rudolf II of Habsburg and the Savoy family.

Along with crystals, precious stones and gold, the workmanship of precious woods such as ebony, ivory, especially used to decorate boxes, and tortoise shell was also widespread in Milan. Because of the fragility of the latter material, very few specimens remain in circulation; however, there are ample descriptions in the catalogs of the old collections of European sovereigns: in ivory workmanship, Giuseppe Guzzi, a pupil of Cristoforo Sant'Agostino i.e., the sculptor of the wooden choir of San Vittore al Corpo, is remembered, who supplied a wooden and ivory desk to Rudolf II, and had several collaborations with the Miseroni and Arcimboldi.

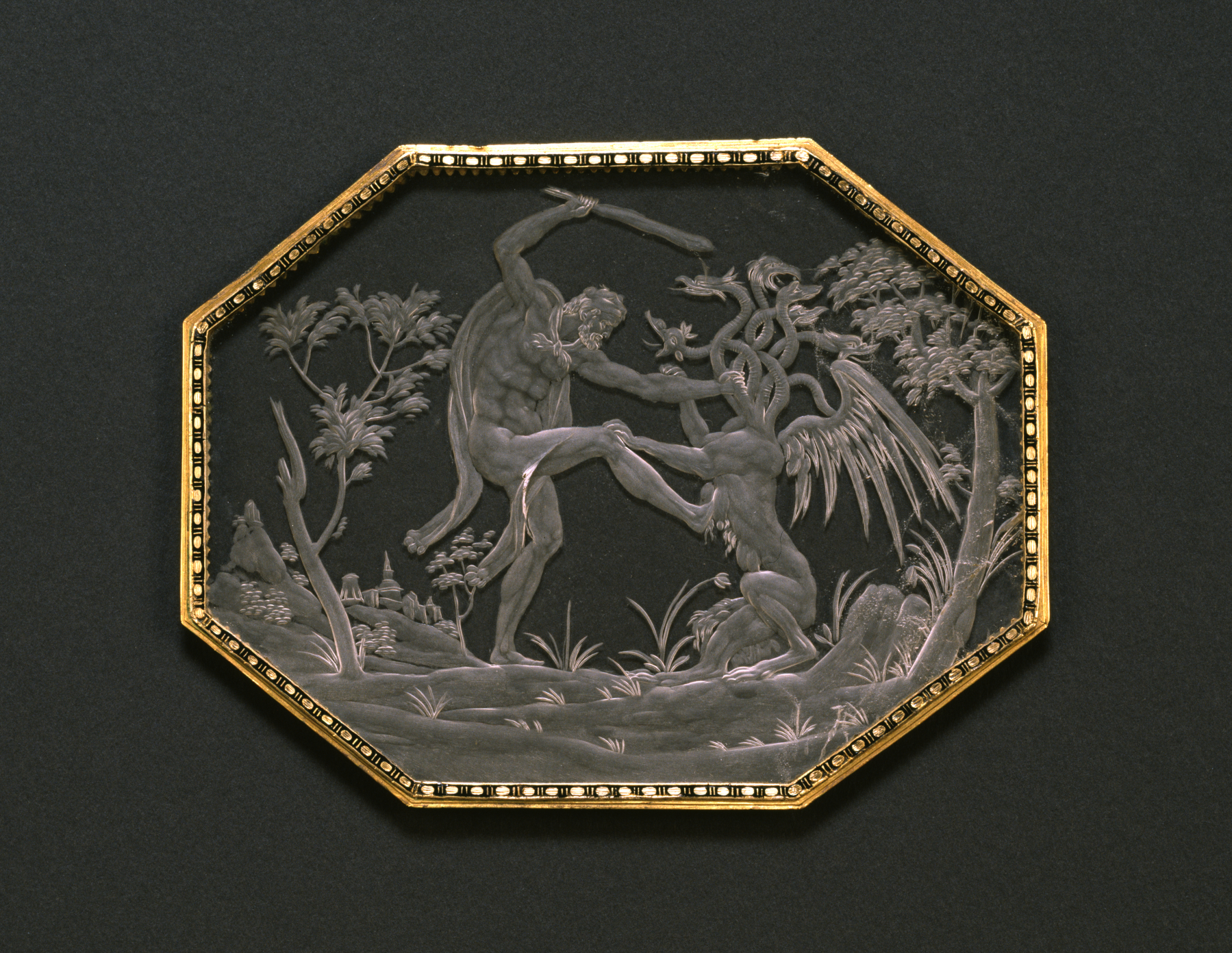
Annibale Fontana, Plaque with Hercules attacking the Hydra of Lerna, Walters Art Museum, Baltimore

Apart from wonder-room objects, the city was also home to the activity of embroidery, which from 1560 onwards was particularly fortunate due in part to the work of Scipione Delfinone, the most famous of Milan's embroiderers along with Camillo Pusterla, with whom he tried his hand at the execution of the gonfalon of Milan based on a design by Giuseppe Meda. The Delfinone (or Delfinoni) workshop had the Stuarts and Tudors of England as patrons. Particularly active in the city was then the guild of embroiderers, which provided for the registration exclusively of female workers, of which Caterina Cantona was a member, who worked on commissions from Christina of Lorraine and Catherine of Austria, and is moreover mentioned in Lomazzo's Rime. In any case, every activity in the field of luxury clothing, as well as accessories such as gloves and hats, was present in the city. The importance of this manufacturing sector led the legislators to introduce regulations on clothing and decoration especially for women: although the stated intent was to spread more sober clothing and prevent families from overspending, the real goal was to favor local manufactures, to the detriment of decorations such as plumes and lace imported from Genoa and Venice.

At the height of their fame, most of the Milanese artisan families were offered to move their workshops to various cities, usually to the seat of their chosen court: this was the case of the aforementioned Ottavio Miseroni, who moved his workshop to Prague at the request of Rudolf II, or the workshops of the Caroni and Gaffuri families, who at the offer of the Medici family moved their business to Florence; it was also customary to move temporarily to a court, such as Michele Scala, who worked for about a year in Mantua for the Gonzagas, or the very short stays of the Saracchi in Munich. The Milanese manufactories still had their fortunes in the first half of the seventeenth century: their end is often identified with the great Manzonian plague in Milan or with the sack of Mantua: the great ducal collections were partly purchased by Charles I of England a few years before the sack, "sold off" by the dukes of Mantua to cope with the family's financial problems, and then destroyed or dispersed by the German troops who invaded the city.

== The Blenio Valley Academy ==
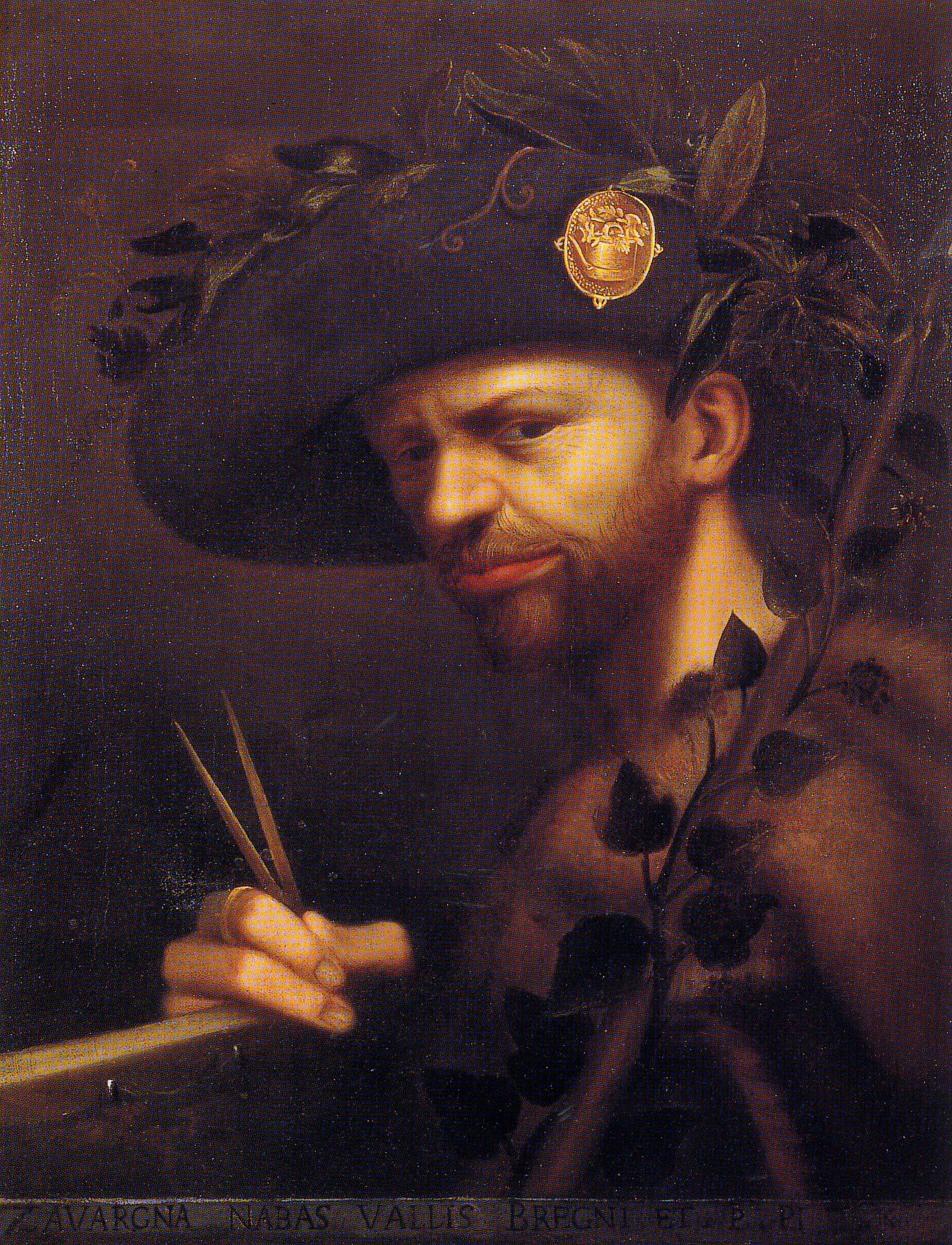
Giovanni Paolo Lomazzo, Self-Portrait in the Costume of the Abbot of the Accademia della Val di Blenio (1568), Pinacoteca di Brera, Milan

A phenomenon long reputed to be marginal and underground, reevaluated only since the last decade of the twentieth century, allowed the activity of the "Rabisch," as the group's adherents were also called, to be classified as a parallel phenomenon to the counter-reformed art of the time that can be referred to as "alternative classicism." The reappraisal moved the academy experience from a purely goliardic and recreational role to a cultural movement that with its "anti-intellectualist attitude" and the idea of art "as free creation" anticipated themes that would be made centuries later in Romanticism and Scapigliatura.

Although difficult to define precisely and to frame within a single activity, the Academy of the Porters of the Blenio Valley was active from the second half of the century in Milan as a group of personalities eager to break out of the mold of the culture forced upon them by Cardinal Borromeo. The work of the group was as varied as its members were, strictly in secret: the soul and "abbot" of the order was Giovanni Paolo Lomazzo, who devoted himself to almost all the activities of the order, including painting, caricature, and poetry, composing the Rabisch dialect collection of verses. Other more active members include Pirro Visconti Borromeo, noble protector of the order, engraver Ambrogio Brambilla and "grand chancellor of the valley," painters Giuseppe Arcimboldi, Aurelio Luini, Ottavio Semino, Paolo Camillo Landriani, sculptor Annibale Fontana, and finally Flemish publisher Nicolaus van Aelst.

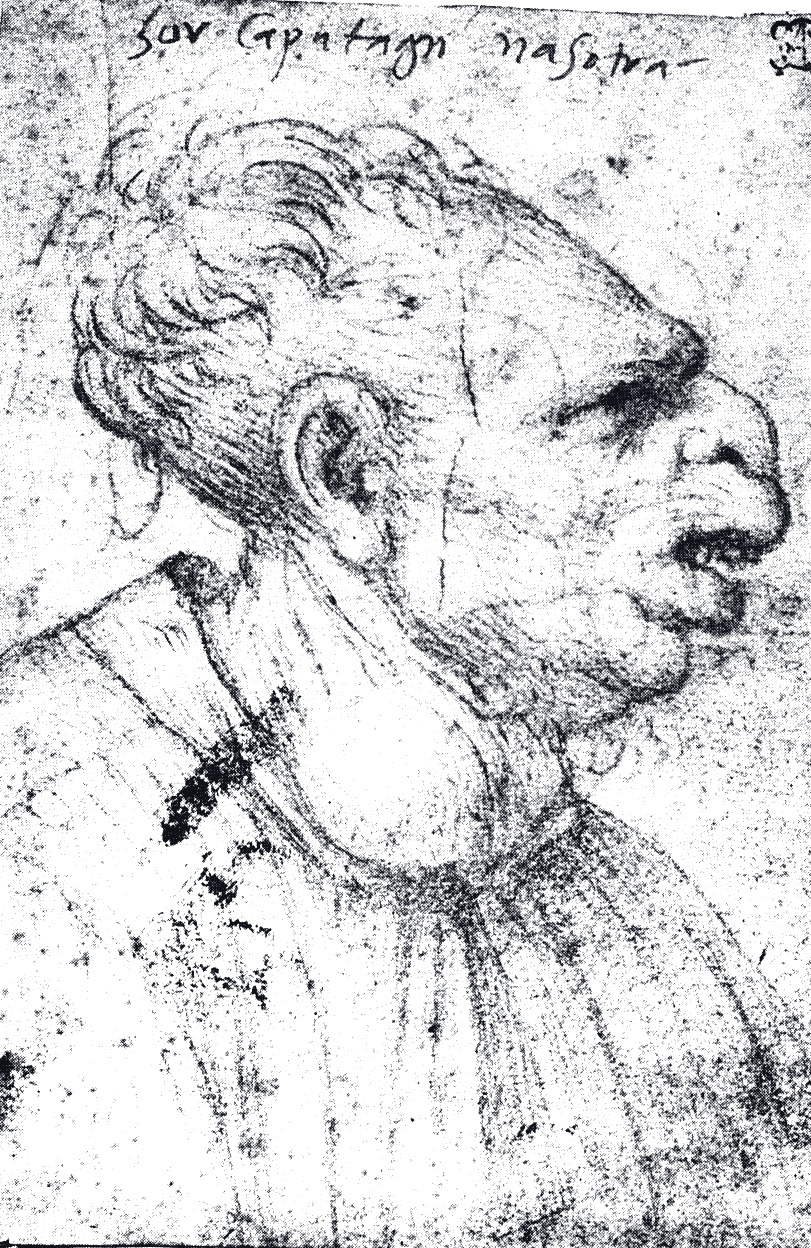
Giovanni Paolo Lomazzo, Sor caputàgn Nasotra, Pinacoteca Ambrosiana, Milan

The group's activities thus ranged from drawings and caricatures of Leonardesque heritage with a taste for the grotesque, to genre painting; from coins distributed to the members of the group, to poems in a dialect based on Bleniense: a kind of rustic Milanese dialect spoken in the valleys of Graubünden, to which borrowings from various languages of the time were added, including Spanish, Tuscan and Genoese. The compositions often bordered on the ridiculous or even the vulgar: it was precisely for this reason that the association remained secret at a time when the Church's control over public morality went so far as to deny associate Aurelio Luini the practice of painting in the city by the archbishop's own order.

Some of the documents attributable to the academy make it possible to describe some of the group's customs. The most famous is Lomazzo's Self-Portrait in the Costume of the Abbot of the Accademia della Val di Blenio, in which the painter reproduces himself wearing a fur coat and a straw hat pinned with the seal of the academy, probably made by Annibale Fontana, depicting a wine container with ivy leaves and vine, the symbol of Bacchus, the central theme of the academy in echoing the Aristotelian belief of the association of artistic creativity with wine intoxication. It is uncertain whether the members actually had to dress in the manner depicted by the painting, however, it was obligatory during the meetings to express themselves in the Bleniense dialect; the language in which the "entrance examination" was conducted, which included a series of questions on the customs and habits of the brentatori, or ancient Ticino wine carriers.

In the academy, therefore, there was no lack of a goliardic and joking component as an end in itself, but it would be wrong to classify it only as such: in Lomazzo's sonnets, in addition to double entendres and mockery, one can find important elements of social criticism toward Borromeo's rigid policies, as well as references to the works of Pietro Aretino and Lucian of Samosata. An attack on humanism can be found in the caricatures that exaggerate and deform the human body, at the center of Renaissance humanistic culture with its perfection, while in the same vein can be placed Arcimboldo's paintings depicting human figures composed of vegetables, which, however, ultimately escape the purposes of the academy because of the classical symbolism to which the painter had to adhere for powerful commissions. The goal of the group was precisely to lash out against the heart of reformed art, that is, against imposed models and fixed rules that would result in orthodox compositions, outside of which it was not possible to exit, in the words of Francesco Porzio, through "the assumption of popular material in a cultured manner, in support of a modern and conscious poetics."

== See also ==
- Gothic art in Milan
- Renaissance in Lombardy
- Neoclassical architecture in Milan
- Art Nouveau in Milan
- History of architecture and art in Milan

== Bibliography ==
- Carlo Borromeo (1577). Instructiones fabricae et suppellectilis ecclesiasticae (in Latin). Milano.
- Paolo Mezzanotte; Giacomo Carlo Bascapé (1968). Milano nell'arte e nella storia. Milano: Bestetti.
- Giovanni Denti (1988). Architettura a Milano tra controriforma e barocco. Firenze: Alinea.
- Marco Rossi (1990). Disegno storico dell'arte lombarda. Milano: Vita e Pensiero.
- Stefano Della Torre; Richard Schofield (1994). Pellegrino Tibaldi architetto e il San Fedele di Milano. Como: NodoLibri.
- Caroline Patey (1996). Manierismo. Milano: Bibliografica.
- Mina Gregori (1998). Pittura a Milano: Rinascimento e Manierismo. Milano: Cariplo.
- Touring club italiano (1998). Milano. Milano: Touring editore.
- Silvio Leydi; Rossana Sacchi (1999). Il Cinquecento. Milano: NodoLibri.
- Stefano Zuffi; Marco Carminati (2000). Pittura in Lombardia: dall'età spagnola al neoclassicismo. Milano: Electa.
- AA.VV. (2002). Grandezza e splendori della Lombardia spagnola. Milano: Skira.
- AA.VV. (2006). La storia dell'arte. Vol. Il tardo Cinquecento (vol. 10). Milano: Electa.
- Marco Dezzi Bardeschi; Federico Bucci; Roberto Dulio (2006). Milano: architettura, città, paesaggio. Roma: Mancosu.
- Maria Teresa Fiorio (2006). Le chiese di Milano. Milano: Electa.
- Maria Teresa Fiorio; Valerio Terraroli (2009). Lombardia manierista. Milano: Skira.
- Cesare Brandi (2013). Disegno dell'architettura italiana. Roma: Castelvecchi.
