= Grue (river) =

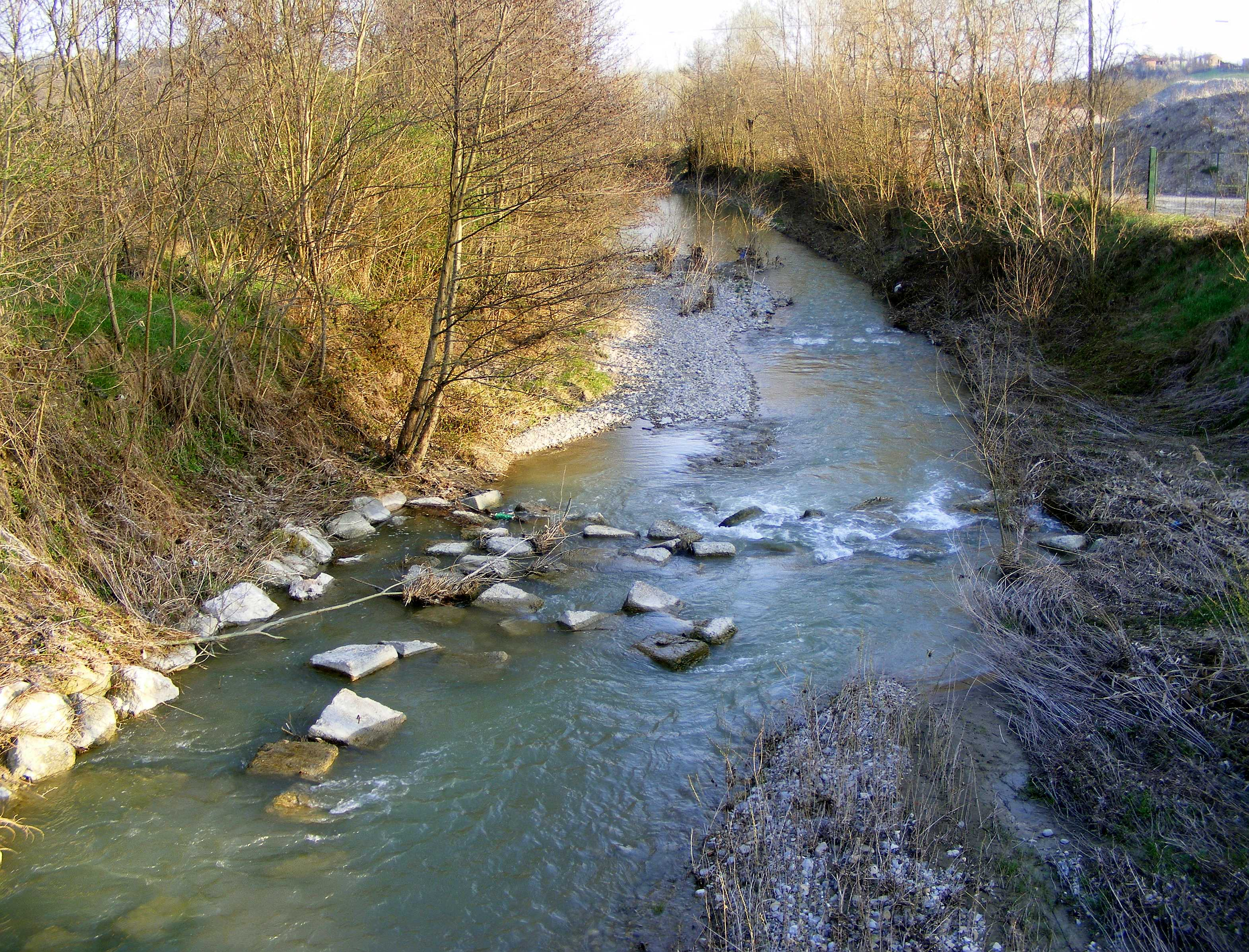
- Grue creek near Sarezzano

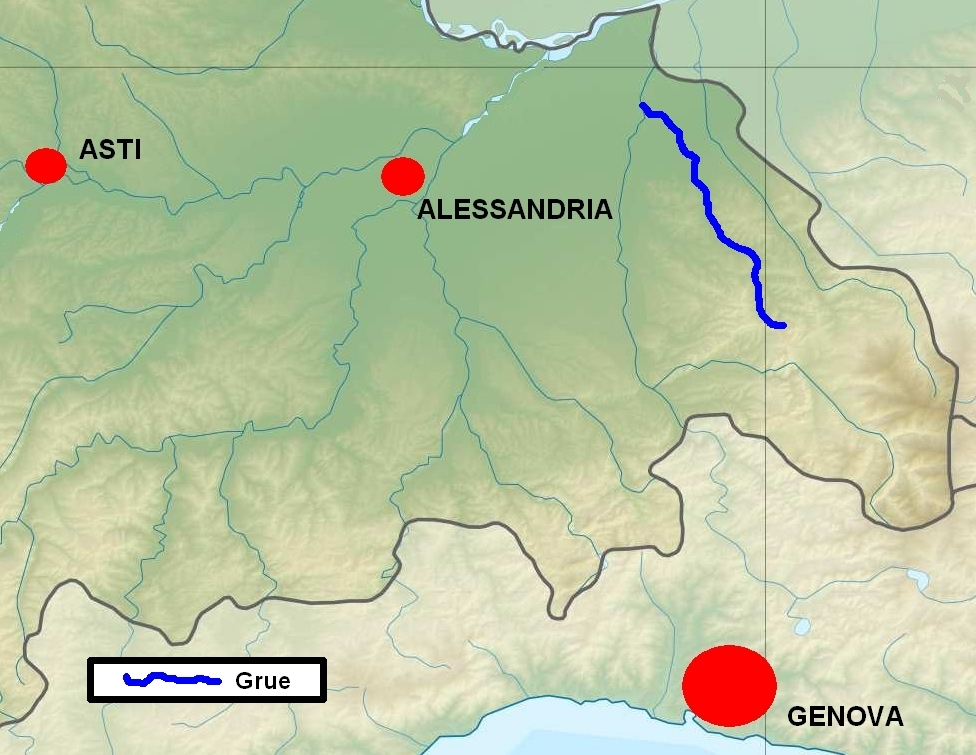
- location within the SE Piedmont

Location
- Country: Italy

Physical characteristics
- Source
  - location: Bocchetta del Barillaro
  - elevation: 636 m (2,087 ft)
- Mouth
  - location: Scrivia
  - coordinates: 44.9800°N 8.8711°E
- Length: 33.1 km (20.6 mi)
- Basin size: 100.8 km^{2} (38.9 mi^{2})
- Discharge
  - average: 1.78 m^{3}/s (63 cu ft/s)

Basin features
- Progression: Scrivia→ Po→ Adriatic Sea

The Grue is a torrent in north-west Italy, a right tributary of the Scrivia, whose 32-kilometre (20 mi) course lies entirely within the Province of Alessandria, Piedmont.

The river’s source is at Bocchetta del Barillaro, at an elevation of 636 metres (2,087 ft) close to the watershed with the Val Borbera. The river follows a tortuous course through the Ligurian Apennines, and between the hills of Tortona, before entering the Po plain at Viguzzolo. From here its path is straighter and it debouches into the Scrivia near Castelnuovo Scrivia at 85 metres (279 ft) above sea level.

The communes through whose territory the Grue passes are Dernice, Garbagna, Avolasca, Casasco, Montemarzino, Montegioco, Cerreto Grue, Sarezzano, Viguzzolo, Berzano di Tortona, Tortona, and Castelnuovo Scrivia.
