= Berzano di Tortona =

- Comune
- Comune di Berzano di Tortona
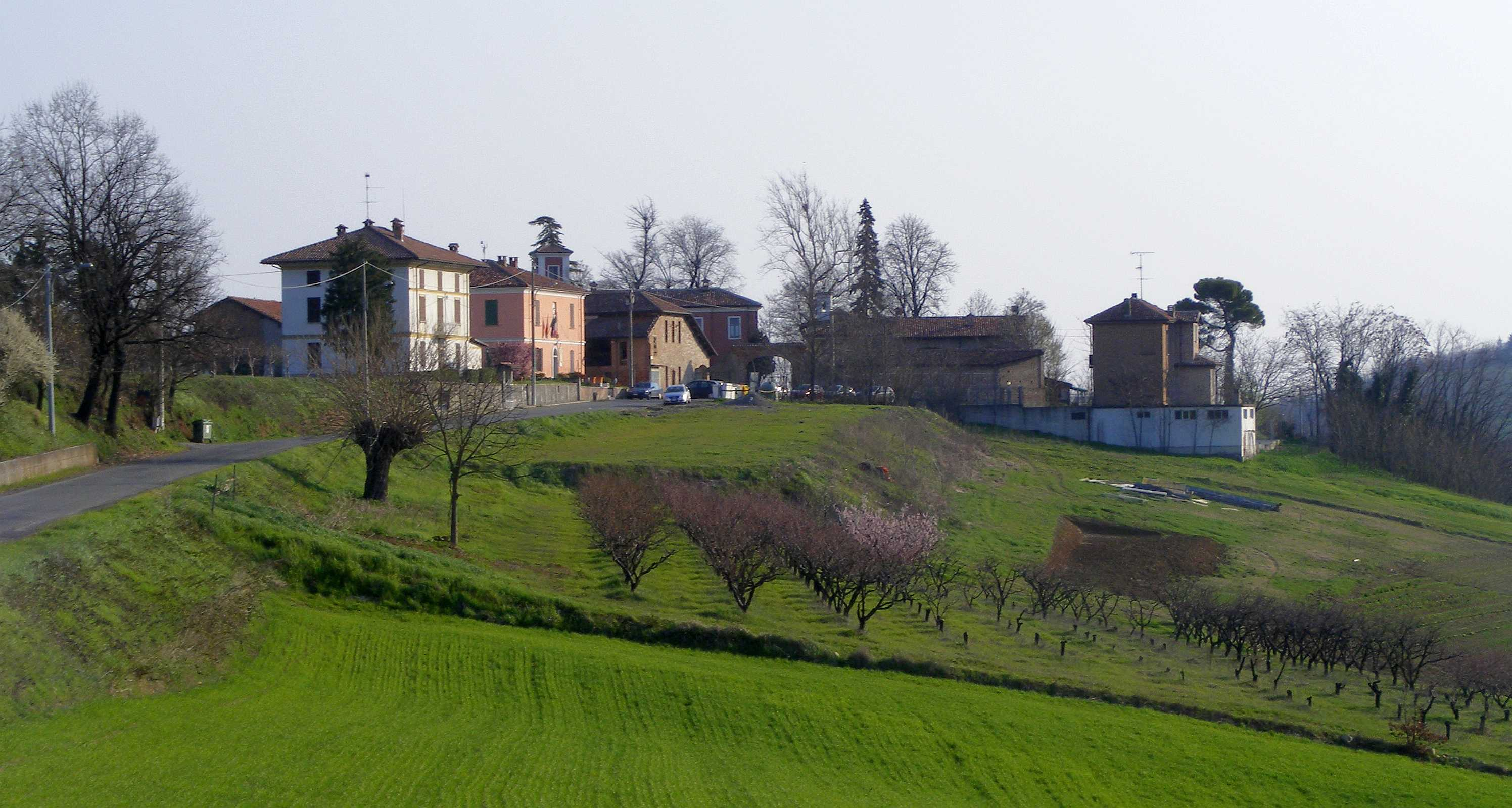

- Coat of arms

- Location within Italy Location within Piedmont
- Coordinates: 44°52′N 8°57′E
- Country: Italy
- Region: Piedmont
- Province: Alessandria (AL)

Government
  - Mayor: Enrica Pavione

Area
  - Total: 2.9 km^{2} (1.1 sq mi)
- Elevation: 270 m (890 ft)

Population (30 April 2017)
  - Total: 155
  - Density: 53/km^{2} (140/sq mi)
- Demonym: Berzanesi
- Time zone: UTC+1 (CET)
  - Summer (DST): UTC+2 (CEST)
- Postal code: 15050
- Dialing code: 0131
- Website: Official website

Berzano di Tortona is a comune (municipality) in the Province of Alessandria in the Italian region Piedmont, located about 100 kilometres (62 mi) east of Turin and about 25 kilometres (16 mi) east of Alessandria, on the watershed between the Grue and Curone valleys.

Berzano di Tortona borders the following municipalities: Monleale, Sarezzano, Viguzzolo, and Volpeglino.

== History ==
Territory of the municipality of Tortona, it followed its destiny until 1818, when it became a commune. From 1928 to 1947 it was part of the municipality of Volpedo.
