= Garbagna =

Garbagna may refer to two Italian small towns in Piedmont:

- Garbagna in the province of Alessandria
- Garbagna Novarese in the province of Novara
