= Castellar Guidobono =

- Comune
- Comune di Castellar Guidobono
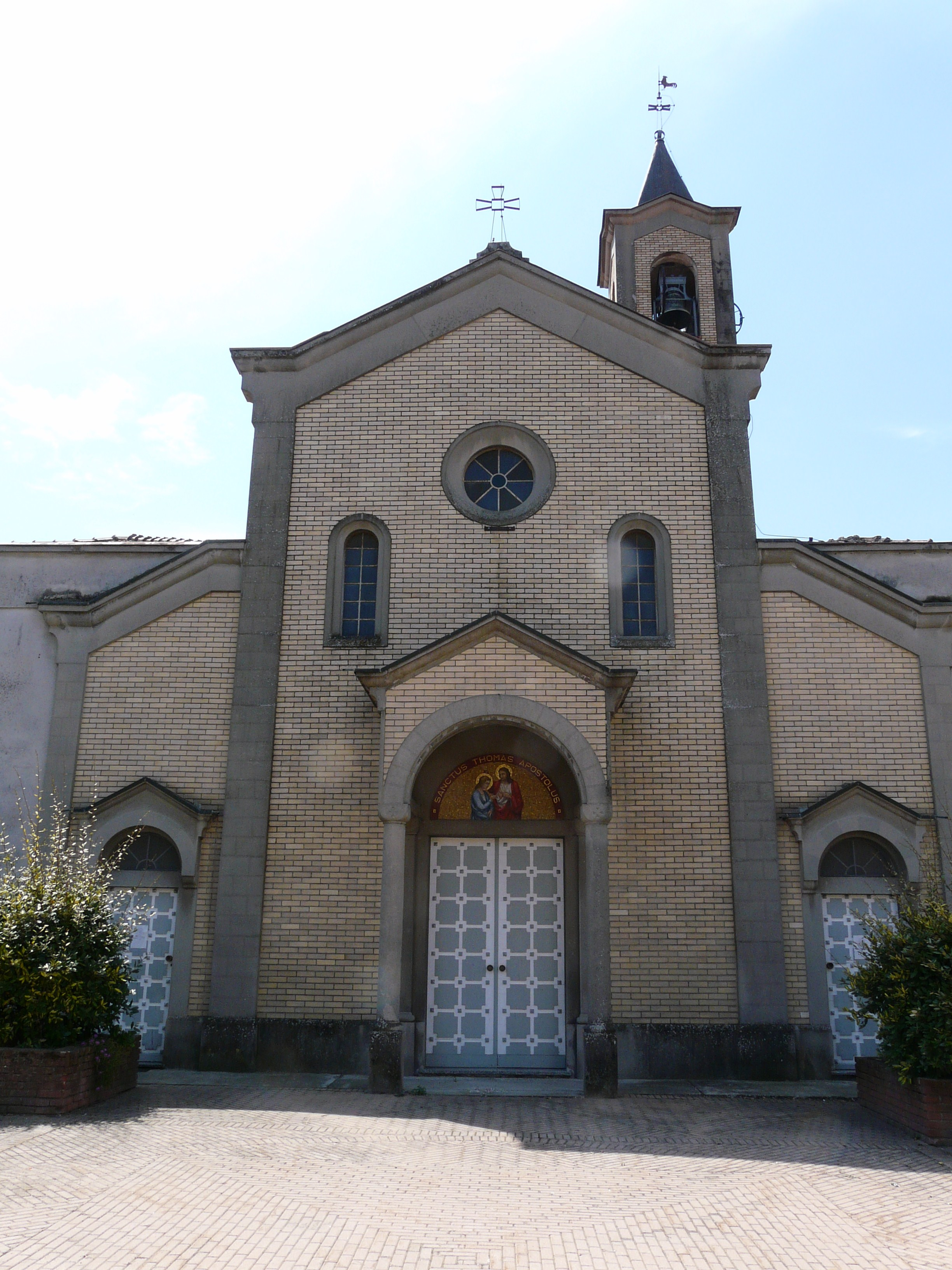
- Church of San Tommaso.

- Location within Italy Location within Piedmont
- Coordinates: 44°54′N 8°56′E
- Country: Italy
- Region: Piedmont
- Province: Alessandria (AL)

Government
  - Mayor: Stefano Arrigone

Area
  - Total: 2.48 km^{2} (0.96 sq mi)
- Elevation: 144 m (472 ft)

Population (30 June 2017)
  - Total: 398
  - Density: 160/km^{2} (416/sq mi)
- Demonym: Castellaresi
- Time zone: UTC+1 (CET)
  - Summer (DST): UTC+2 (CEST)
- Postal code: 15050
- Dialing code: 0131
- Website: Official website

Castellar Guidobono is a comune (municipality) in the Province of Alessandria in the Italian region Piedmont, located about 100 kilometres (62 mi) east of Turin and about 25 kilometres (16 mi) east of Alessandria.

Castellar Guidobono borders the following municipalities: Casalnoceto, Viguzzolo, and Volpeglino.

== History ==
Linked to the municipality of Tortona, whose destiny it followed, it was a fief of the Guidobono Cavalchini family of Monleale, from which it derives its name.

== Sights ==
The main landmarks of Castellar Guidobono are the Parish church of San Tommaso Apostolo, built in the 18th century, and the so-called Villa, a Gothic Revival building surrounded by a park and featuring two large towers. The Villa was formerly the residence of the Counts of Montebruno and later of the Thellung de Courtelary family. It has since been converted into a nightclub.

Between 1889 and 1934, Castellar Guidobono had a stop on the Tortona–Monleale tramway, which was 10.345 km long.
