= List of extreme temperatures in Italy =

The following table lists the highest and lowest temperatures recorded in each region in Italy, in both Celsius and Fahrenheit.

Region	Record high Temperature	Date	Place(s)	Record low Temperature	Date	Place(s)
Abruzzo	40.8 °C (105.4 °F)	July 6, 1950	Pescara	−41.0 °C (−41.8 °F)	January 1985	Campo Imperatore, Gran Sasso
Aosta Valley	38.4 °C (101.1 °F)	June 25, 2003	Saint-Christophe	−42.0 °C (−43.6 °F)	January 30, 1963	Gran Gioves, Monte Bianco
Apulia	47.0 °C (116.6 °F)	June 25, 2007	Foggia	−14.0 °C (6.8 °F)	February 1929	San Giovanni Rotondo
Basilicata	45.9 °C (114.6 °F)	July 24, 2007	Pisticci	−10.8 °C (12.6 °F)	January 14, 1968	Latronico
Calabria	46.2 or 44.2 °C (115.2 or 111.6 °F)	July 1983 or July 25, 1983*	Melito di Porto Salvo or Reggio Calabria	−24.6 or −16.2 °C (−12.3 or 2.8 °F)	February 1993 or December 1, 1957	Nocelle, Serrastretta or Monte Scuro, Sila
Campania	43.7 °C (110.7 °F)	August 2011	Castelvenere	−14.8 °C (5.4 °F)	January 6, 1966	Trevico
Emilia-Romagna	44.0 °C (111.2 °F)	July 30, 1983	Porretta Terme	−26.2 °C (−15.2 °F)	February 1956 and January 1985	Anzola and Conselice
Friuli-Venezia Giulia	40.7 °C (105.3 °F)	July 21, 2006	Arzenutto, San Martino al Tagliamento	−34.0 °C (−29.2 °F)	January 6, 1985	Alpe Tamer, Monte Mangart
Lazio	45.0 °C (113.0 °F)	August 2007	Boville Ernica	−22.5 °C (−8.5 °F)	January 3, 1979	Monte Terminillo
Liguria	40.5 or 38.5 °C (104.9 or 101.3 °F)	July 2011 or June 29, 1935	Sarzana or Statale Ligure, Genoa	−22.1 °C (−7.8 °F)	February 6, 2012	Sassello
Lombardy	44.1 °C (111.4 °F)	July 21, 2006	Pegognaga	−38.0 °C (−36.4 °F)	January 6, 1985*	Livigno
Marche	44.0 °C (111.2 °F)	July 2000	Ascoli Piceno	−20.0 °C (−4.0 °F)	January 1985	Castelsantangelo sul Nera
Molise	42.7 °C (108.9 °F)	July 2012	Melanico, Santa Croce di Magliano	−15.0 or −10.8 °C (5.0 or 12.6 °F)	January 5, 1980 or January 14, 1968	Jelsi or Campobasso
Piedmont	42.9 °C (109.2 °F)	August 11, 2003	Spineto Scrivia	−41.0 °C (−41.8 °F)	January 1929	Margherita Hut, Monte Rosa
Sardinia	47.3 °C (117.1 °F)	July 19, 2023	Sestu	−17.0 °C (1.4 °F)	February 13, 2012	Gavoi
Sicily	48.8 °C (119.8 °F)	August 11, 2021	Floridia or Siracusa	−15.2 °C (4.6 °F)	February 9, 1956	Casa Cantoniera, Mount Etna
Trentino-South Tyrol	40.1 °C (104.2 °F)	August 11, 2003	Tramin	−50.6 °C (−59.1 °F)	January 7, 2022	Busa Riviera, Pale di San Martino, Trento
Tuscany	43.1 °C (109.6 °F)	August 6, 2003	Antella	−26.0 °C (−14.8 °F)	January 8, 1985	Firenzuola
Umbria	44.5 °C (112.1 °F)	August 3, 2017	Orvieto	−28.0 °C (−18.4 °F)	February 7, 2005	Castelluccio, Norcia
Veneto	40.2 °C (104.4 °F)	July 23, 2022	Treviso	−45.5 °C (−49.9 °F)	December 18, 2009	Busa delle Sponde Alte, Pale di San Martino, Belluno

*Also on earlier date or dates in that region or city.
