= Volpeglino =

- Comune
- Comune di Volpeglino
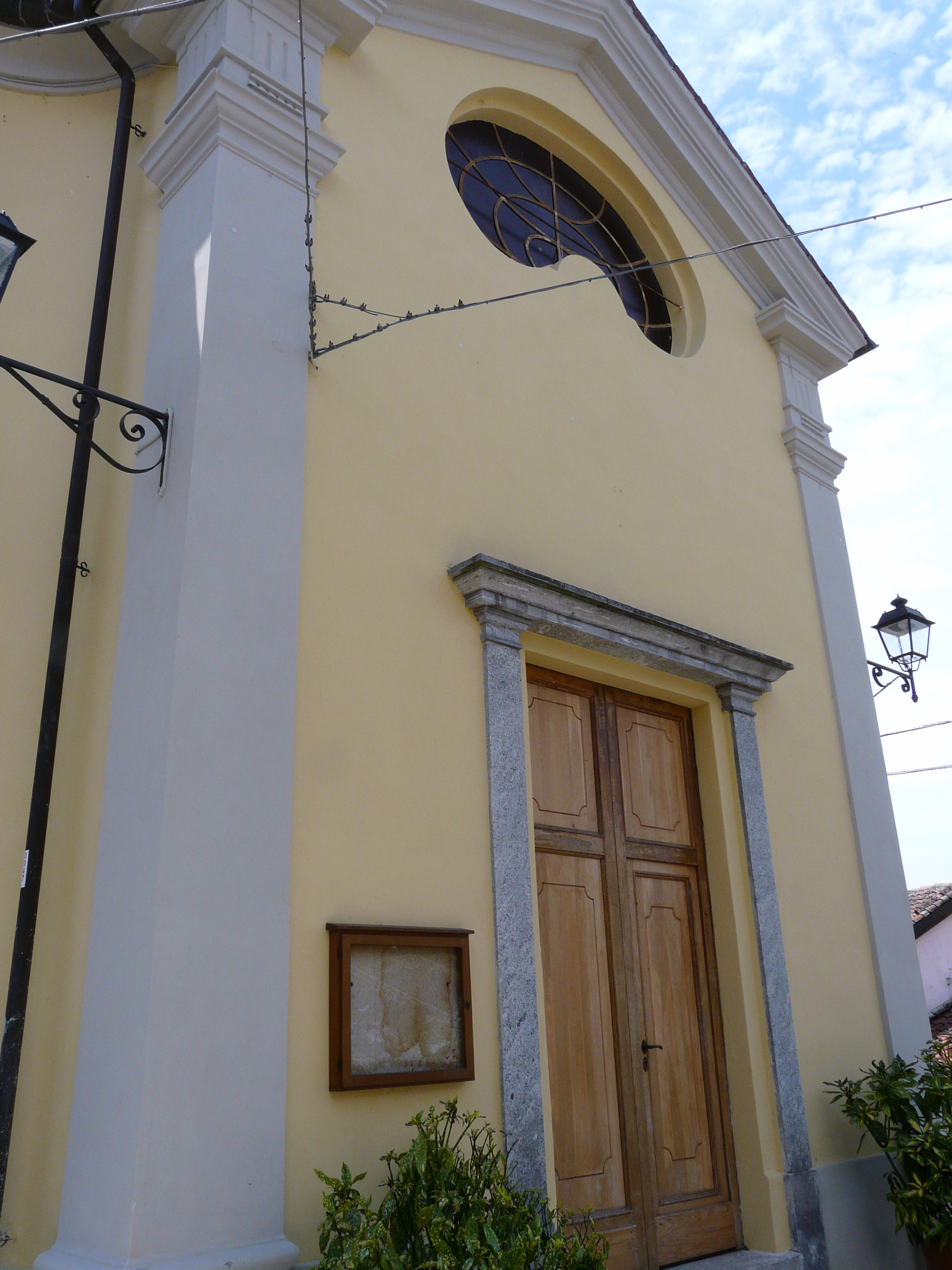
- Church of Saint Cosmas and Damian.

- Location within Italy Location within Piedmont
- Coordinates: 44°53′N 8°57′E
- Country: Italy
- Region: Piedmont
- Province: Alessandria (AL)

Government
  - Mayor: Giuseppe Brivio

Area
  - Total: 3.2 km^{2} (1.2 sq mi)
- Elevation: 243 m (797 ft)

Population (30 November 2017)
  - Total: 140
  - Density: 44/km^{2} (110/sq mi)
- Demonym: Volpeglinesi
- Time zone: UTC+1 (CET)
  - Summer (DST): UTC+2 (CEST)
- Postal code: 15050
- Dialing code: 0131
- Website: Official website

Volpeglino is a comune (municipality) in the Province of Alessandria in the Italian region Piedmont, located about 100 kilometres (62 mi) east of Turin and about 25 kilometres (16 mi) east of Alessandria.

Volpeglino borders the following municipalities: Berzano di Tortona, Casalnoceto, Castellar Guidobono, Monleale, Viguzzolo, and Volpedo.

== History ==
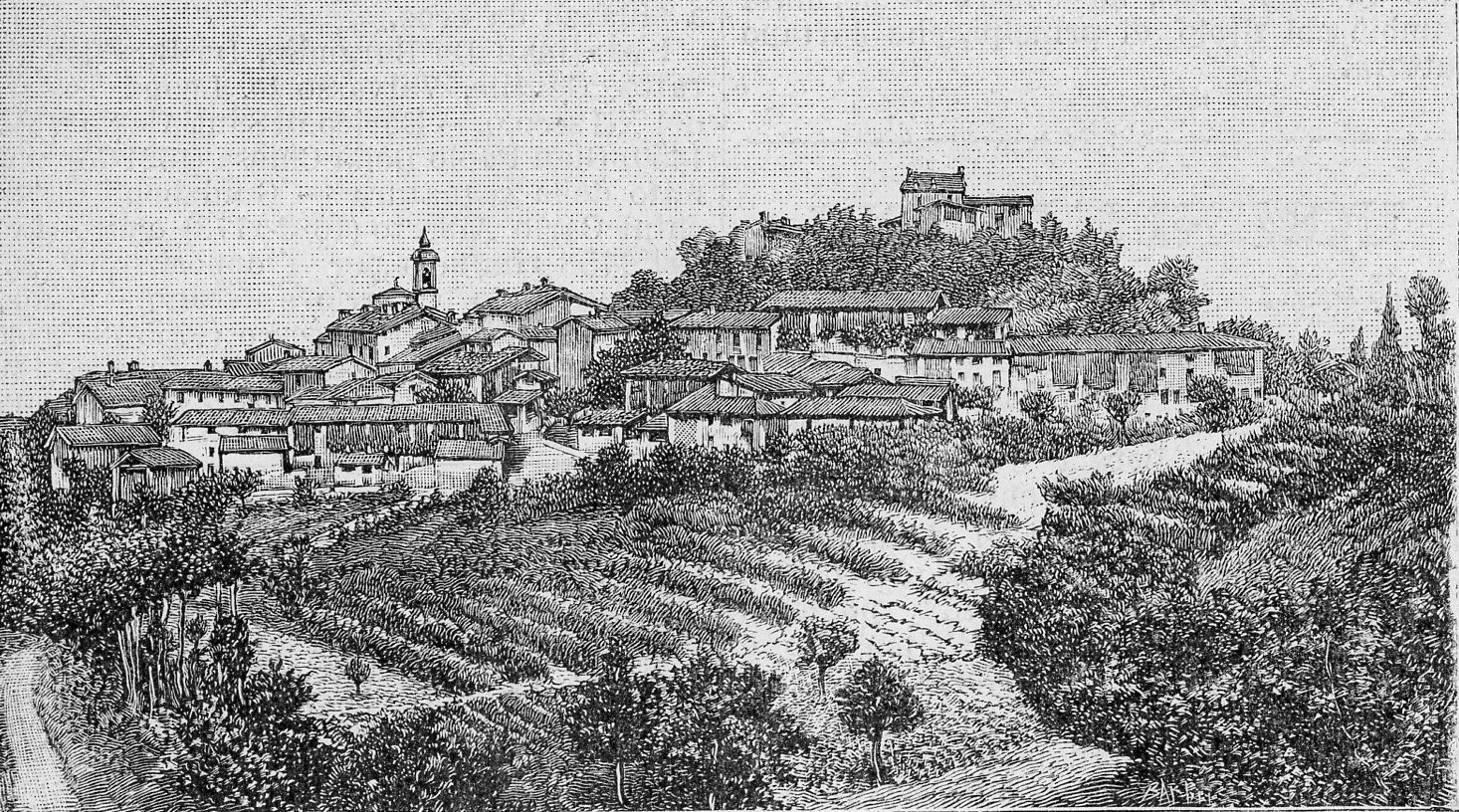

Was an ancient monastic cell owned by the Bobbio Abbey, already in the list of courts of the Bobbio monastery at the time of Charlemagne and Abbot Wala, with the toponyms of Vulpiclinum, Vulpiclinus, Vulpiclini or Vulpidino between 834 and 836, derived from the Latin vulpicula, place of foxes. The cell is included in the monastic court of Casasco. A fief of the Guidobono family in the 12th century, it entered the Tortonese orbit. A free commune in 1245, it came under the Visconti, who granted it as a fief to the Guidobono Cavalchini.

Volpeglino was aggregated with the municipality of Volpedo in 1928; it was detached from it again in 1947.
