= Pozzolo Formigaro =

- Comune
- Comune di Pozzolo Formigaro
- Location within Italy Location within Piedmont
- Coordinates: 44°48′N 8°47′E
- Country: Italy
- Region: Piedmont
- Province: Province of Alessandria (AL)

Government
  - Mayor: Domenico Miloscio (Civic list)

Area
  - Total: 36.18 km^{2} (13.97 sq mi)
- Elevation: 171 m (561 ft)

Population (1-1-2017)
  - Total: 4,507
  - Density: 124.6/km^{2} (322.6/sq mi)
- Demonym: Pozzolese(i)
- Time zone: UTC+1 (CET)
  - Summer (DST): UTC+2 (CEST)
- Postal code: 15068
- Dialing code: 0143
- Website: http://www.comune.pozzoloformigaro.al.it/

Pozzolo Formigaro is a comune (municipality) in the Province of Alessandria in the Italian region Piedmont, located about 90 kilometres (56 mi) southeast of Turin and about 20 kilometres (12 mi) southeast of Alessandria. As of 1 January 2022, it had a population of 4,507 and an area of 36.18 square kilometres (13.97 mi^{2}).

Pozzolo Formigaro borders the following municipalities: Bosco Marengo, Cassano Spinola, Novi Ligure, Tortona, and Villalvernia.

== Demographic evolution ==
Historical population

Year	Pop.	±%
1861	4,165	—
1871	4,022	−3.4%
1881	4,054	+0.8%
1901	4,185	+3.2%
1911	4,613	+10.2%

Year	Pop.	±%
1921	4,527	−1.9%
1931	4,245	−6.2%
1936	4,071	−4.1%
1951	4,170	+2.4%
1961	4,257	+2.1%

Year	Pop.	±%
1971	4,407	+3.5%
1981	4,781	+8.5%
1991	4,785	+0.1%
2001	4,771	−0.3%

Source: Data from ISTAT

== Notable people ==
- Francesco Remotti, Anthropologist
- Ezia Gavazza, Professor of Modern Art History
- Monsignor Pietro Gambarotta, (7 February 1921 – 15 March 2008) Parish priest of the church of San Nicolò from 1954 to 2007.
