= Montemarzino =

- Comune
- Comune di Montemarzino
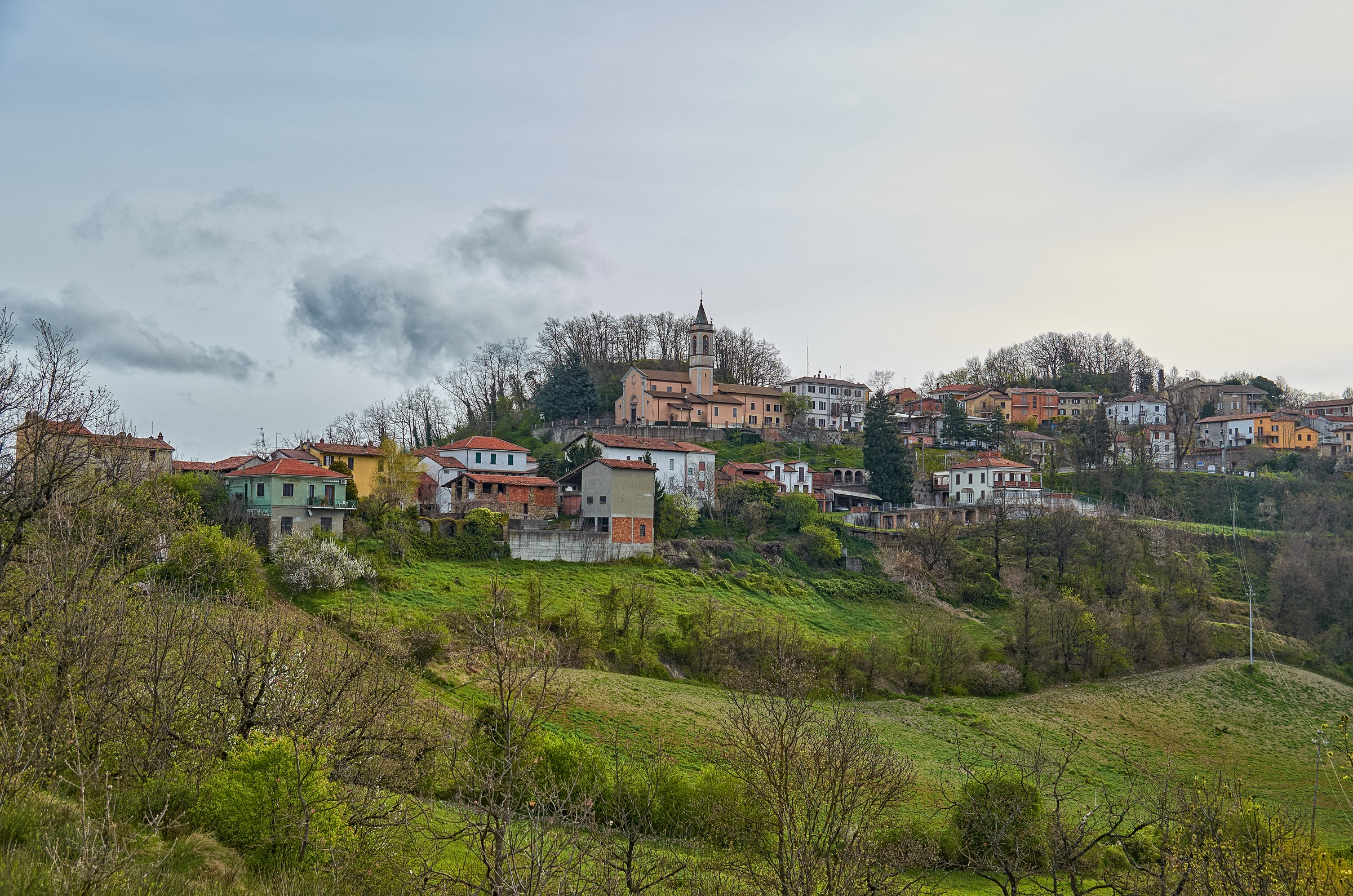

- Location within Italy Location within Piedmont
- Coordinates: 44°51′N 9°0′E
- Country: Italy
- Region: Piedmont
- Province: Alessandria (AL)

Government
  - Mayor: Giammattia Nicolini Berutti

Area
  - Total: 9.85 km^{2} (3.80 sq mi)
- Elevation: 448 m (1,470 ft)

Population (1 January 2021)
  - Total: 309
  - Density: 31.4/km^{2} (81.2/sq mi)
- Demonym: Montemarzinesi
- Time zone: UTC+1 (CET)
  - Summer (DST): UTC+2 (CEST)
- Postal code: 15050
- Dialing code: 0131

Montemarzino is a comune (municipality) in the Province of Alessandria in the Italian region Piedmont, located about 110 kilometres (68 mi) east of Turin and about 30 kilometres (19 mi) east of Alessandria.

Montemarzino borders the following municipalities: Avolasca, Casasco, Momperone, Monleale, Montegioco, Pozzol Groppo, and Volpedo.

== History ==
Ancient imperial feud of the Oltrepò Pavese, in 1685 it was granted to the Spanish branch of the Spinola family, marquises of los Balbases, dukes of Severino and Sesto, lords of Casalnoceto, Rosano and Barisonzo. Governed with a feudal system by the marquises Paolo Vincenzo called Ambrogio (1685-99) and by Carlo Filippo Antonio (1699-1721), Ambrogio II Gaetano (1721-1724), in 1753 Gioacchino ceded the feudal state to the Savoys.
