= Castellania Coppi =

- Comune
- Comune di Castellania
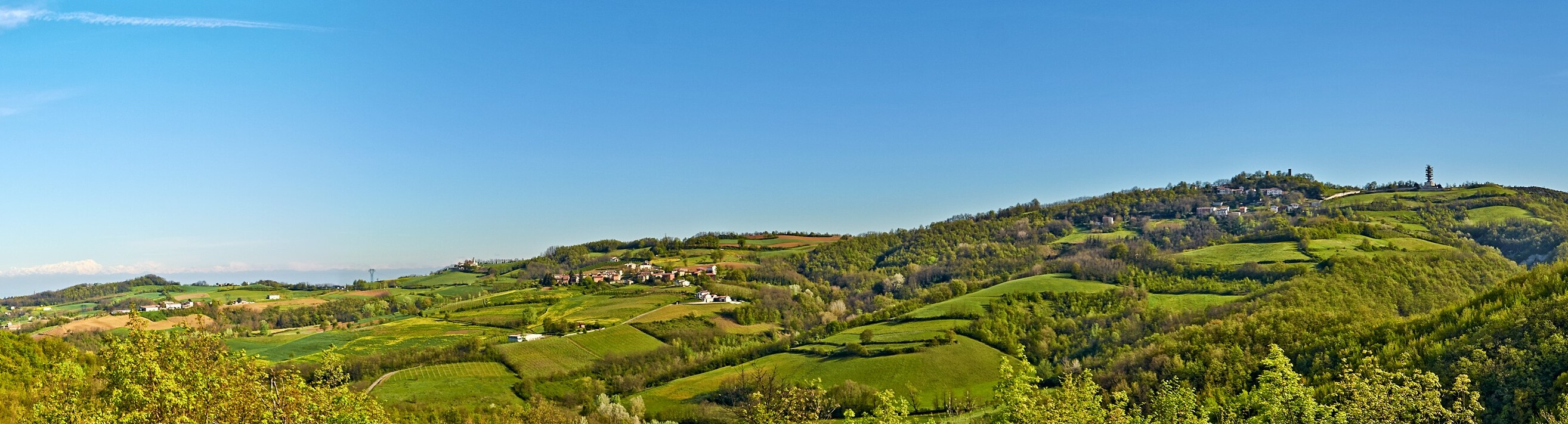

- Location within Italy Location within Piedmont
- Coordinates: 44°47′N 8°55′E
- Country: Italy
- Region: Piedmont
- Province: Alessandria (AL)
- Frazioni: Mossabella, Sant'Alosio

Government
  - Mayor: Sergio Vallenzona (Civic list)

Area
  - Total: 7.21 km^{2} (2.78 sq mi)
- Elevation: 400 m (1,300 ft)

Population (31 August 2022)
  - Total: 90
  - Density: 12/km^{2} (32/sq mi)
- Demonym: Castellanesi
- Time zone: UTC+1 (CET)
  - Summer (DST): UTC+2 (CEST)
- Postal code: 15052
- Dialing code: 0131
- Website: Official website

Castellania Coppi is a comune (municipality) in the Province of Alessandria in the Italian region Piedmont, located about 100 kilometres (62 mi) southeast of Turin and about 30 kilometres (19 mi) southeast of Alessandria. It was known until 2019 as Castellania, and renamed by the Piemont regional council in recognition of the cyclist Fausto Coppi in preparation for the centenary of his birth.

Castellania Coppi borders the following municipalities: Avolasca, Carezzano, Costa Vescovato, Garbagna, Sant'Agata Fossili, and Sardigliano.

== People ==
Castellania Coppi is known as the birthplace of, and was renamed in honour of, two famous racing cyclists: Angelo Fausto Coppi (1919–1960) and his brother Serse Coppi (1923–1951).
