= Sardigliano =

- Comune
- Comune di Sardigliano
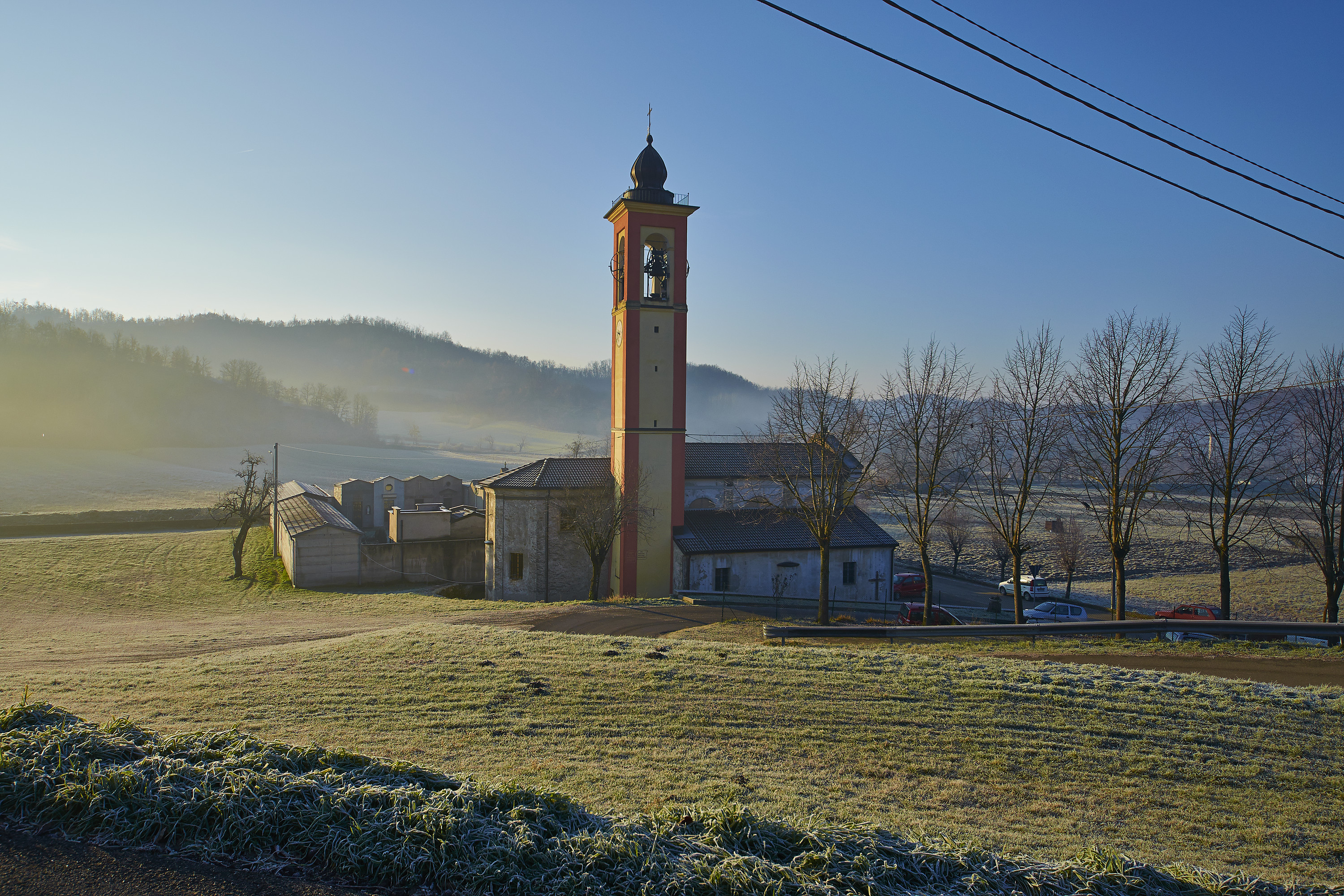

- Location within Italy Location within Piedmont
- Coordinates: 44°45′N 8°54′E
- Country: Italy
- Region: Piedmont
- Province: Alessandria (AL)
- Frazioni: Malvino, Cuquello, Bavantore, Bavantorino, Sant'Antonio

Government
  - Mayor: Renato Galardini

Area
  - Total: 12.74 km^{2} (4.92 sq mi)
- Elevation: 210 m (690 ft)

Population (31 August 2018)
  - Total: 400
  - Density: 31/km^{2} (81/sq mi)
- Demonym: Sardiglianesi
- Time zone: UTC+1 (CET)
  - Summer (DST): UTC+2 (CEST)
- Postal code: 15060
- Dialing code: 0143
- Website: Official website

Sardigliano is a comune (municipality) in the Province of Alessandria in the Italian region Piedmont, located about 100 kilometres (62 mi) southeast of Turin and about 30 kilometres (19 mi) southeast of Alessandria.

Sardigliano borders the following municipalities: Borghetto di Borbera, Cassano Spinola, Castellania Coppi, Garbagna, Sant'Agata Fossili, and Stazzano.
