= Gavazzana =

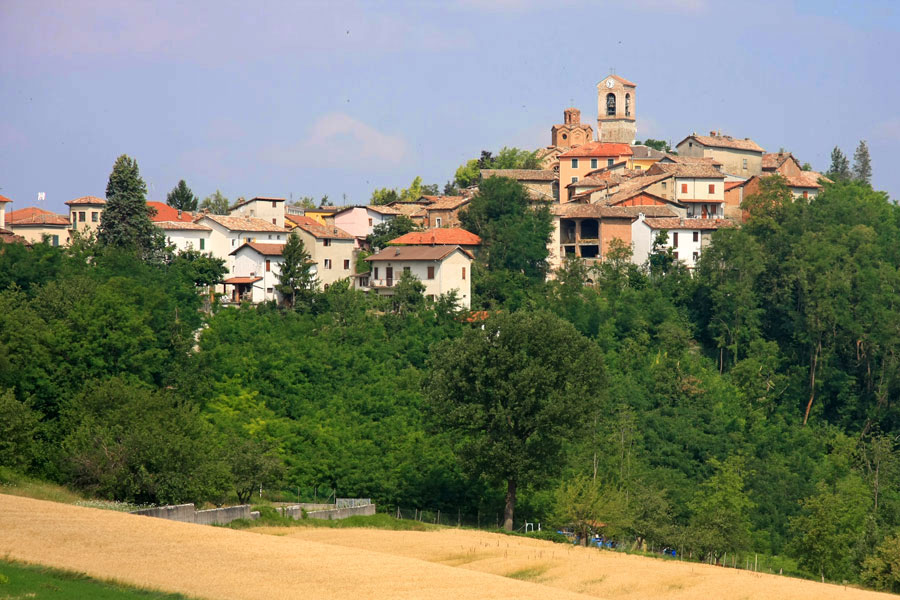
Panorama of Gavazzana.

Gavazzana is a frazione of Cassano Spinola in the Province of Alessandria in the Italian region Piedmont, located about 100 kilometres (62 mi) southeast of Turin and about 25 kilometres (16 mi) southeast of Alessandria.

It was a separate commune until 1 January 2018; an appellate court ruled that the merger was legitimate.

The local economy of Gavazzana has traditionally been based on agriculture, with small-scale farming and related rural activities playing a central role in the area’s development. In recent years, the population has declined, reflecting broader demographic trends seen in many rural parts of northern Italy.
