= Carezzano =

- Comune
- Comune di Carezzano
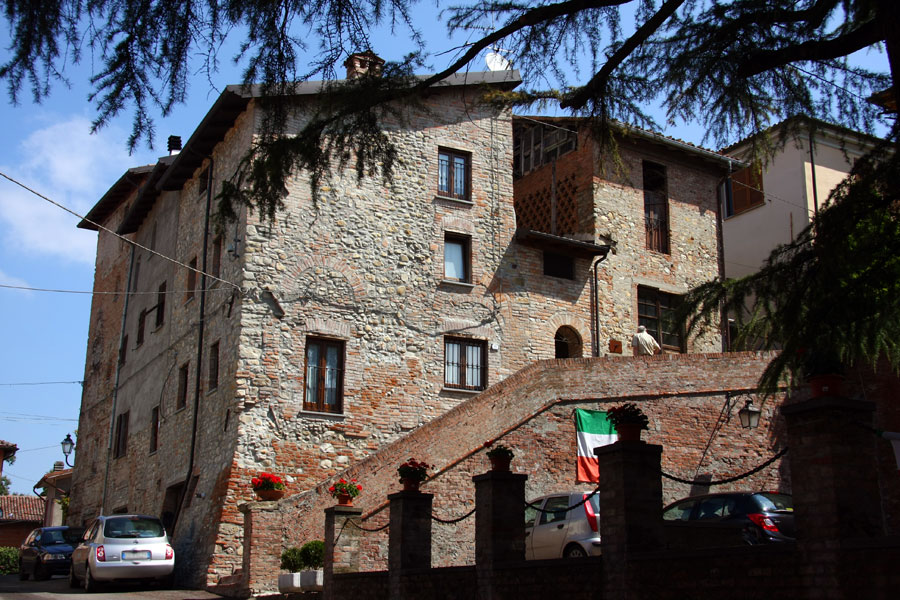

- Location within Italy Location within Piedmont
- Coordinates: 44°48′N 8°54′E
- Country: Italy
- Region: Piedmont
- Province: Alessandria (AL)
- Frazioni: Carezzano Maggiore, Carezzano Superiore

Government
  - Mayor: Luigi Prati

Area
  - Total: 10.48 km^{2} (4.05 sq mi)
- Elevation: 180 m (590 ft)

Population (31 August 2022)
  - Total: 431
  - Density: 41.1/km^{2} (107/sq mi)
- Demonym: Carezzanesi
- Time zone: UTC+1 (CET)
  - Summer (DST): UTC+2 (CEST)
- Postal code: 15051
- Dialing code: 0131
- Website: Official website

Carezzano is a comune (municipality) in the Province of Alessandria in the Italian region Piedmont, located about 100 kilometres (62 mi) southeast of Turin and about 25 kilometres (16 mi) southeast of Alessandria. As of 31 December 2004, it had a population of 429 and an area of 10.3 square kilometres (4.0 mi^{2}). Carezzano borders the following municipalities: Cassano Spinola, Castellania Coppi, Costa Vescovato, Paderna, Sant'Agata Fossili, Tortona, and Villalvernia.
