= Villaromagnano =

- Comune
- Comune di Villaromagnano
- Coat of arms

- Location within Italy Location within Piedmont
- Coordinates: 44°50′N 8°53′E
- Country: Italy
- Region: Piedmont
- Province: Alessandria (AL)

Government
  - Mayor: Luciano Pavese

Area
  - Total: 6.07 km^{2} (2.34 sq mi)
- Elevation: 170 m (560 ft)

Population (30 November 2018)
  - Total: 672
  - Density: 111/km^{2} (287/sq mi)
- Demonym: Villettesi
- Time zone: UTC+1 (CET)
  - Summer (DST): UTC+2 (CEST)
- Postal code: 15050
- Dialing code: 0131
- Website: Official website

Villaromagnano is a comune (municipality) in the Province of Alessandria in the Italian region Piedmont, located about 100 kilometres (62 mi) southeast of Turin and about 25 kilometres (16 mi) southeast of Alessandria.

Villaromagnano borders the following municipalities: Carbonara Scrivia, Cerreto Grue, Costa Vescovato, Paderna, Sarezzano, Spineto Scrivia, and Tortona.
