= Pontecurone =

- Comune
- Comune di Pontecurone
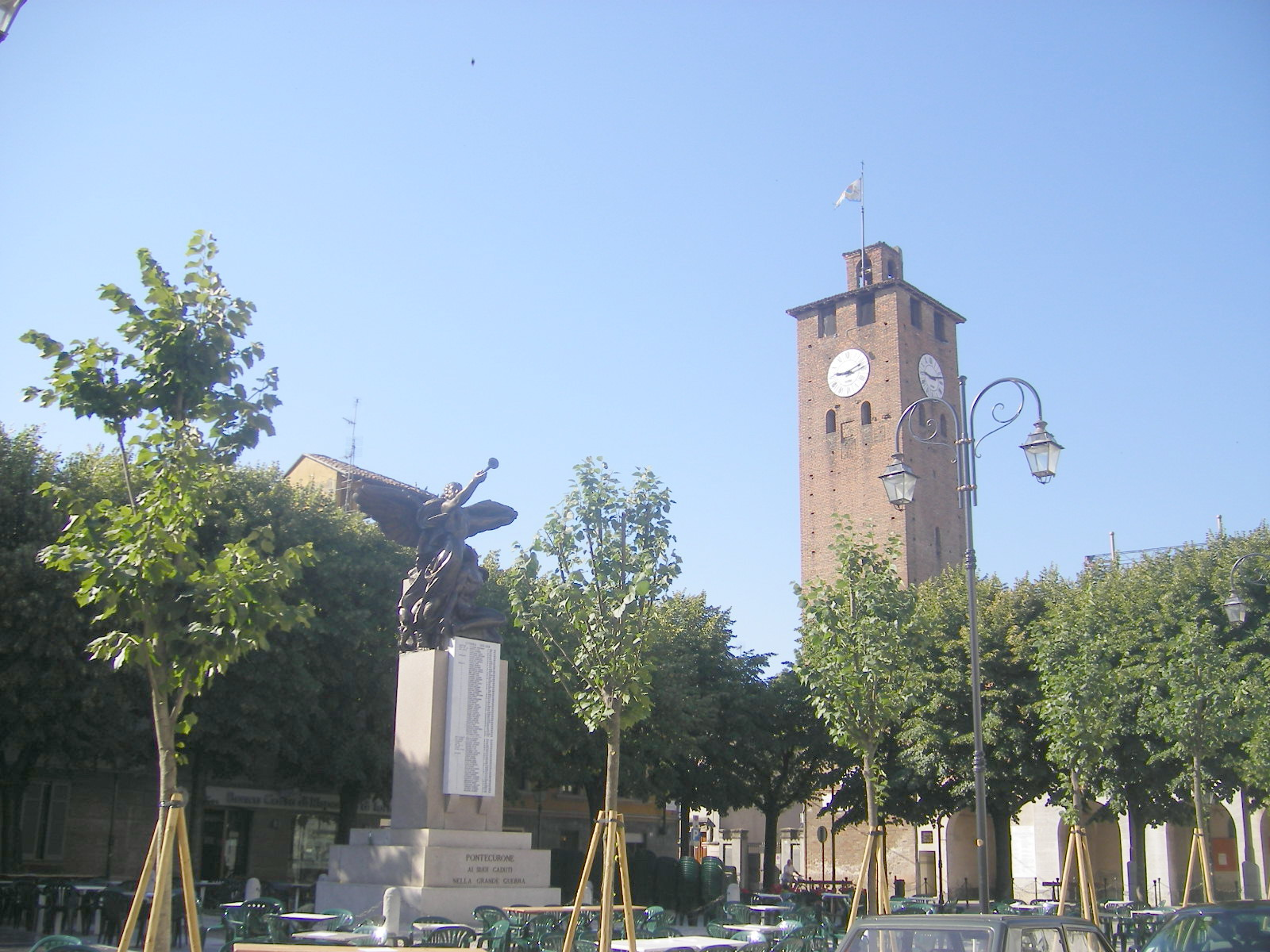

- Coat of arms

- Location within Italy Location within Piedmont
- Coordinates: 44°57′N 8°55′E
- Country: Italy
- Region: Piedmont
- Province: Alessandria (AL)

Government
  - Mayor: Giovanni Valentino D'Amico

Area
  - Total: 29.7 km^{2} (11.5 sq mi)
- Elevation: 104 m (341 ft)

Population (30 November 2021)
  - Total: 3,528
  - Density: 119/km^{2} (308/sq mi)
- Demonym: Pontecuronesi
- Time zone: UTC+1 (CET)
  - Summer (DST): UTC+2 (CEST)
- Postal code: 15055
- Dialing code: 0131
- Website: Official website

Pontecurone (Piedmontese: Poncròu) is a comune (municipality) in the Province of Alessandria in the Italian region Piedmont, located on the left bank of the Curone, about 100 kilometres (62 mi) east of Turin and about 25 kilometres (16 mi) east of Alessandria.

Pontecurone borders the following municipalities: Casalnoceto, Casei Gerola, Castelnuovo Scrivia, Rivanazzano Terme, Tortona, Viguzzolo, and Voghera.

In 1635 it was the site of a battle in which Odoardo Farnese, duke of Parma and Piacenza and allied to the French, defeated the Spanish troops under Caspar Azevedo.

== History ==
The first inhabited nucleus of Pontecurone can already be dated back to the Augustan period - with the flourishing of the Via Postumia (which connected Piacenza to Genoa via Voghera, Tortona and Libarna) in the vicinity of the very important ford on the Curone - thanks to the discovery of numerous coins from that period in the territory.

It appears since the Lombard age among the possessions of the abbey of San Colombano di Bobbio with the toponym Ponte Coroni. A few years before the year 1000 (in 962), Otto I donated some properties to the Pavia monastery of San Pietro in Ciel d'Oro, among which also the locality of Ponte Coironum: this is the first written evidence of the existence of Pontecurone.

In the Vatican Gallery of Maps (late 16th century), Pontecurone is referred to as Pons Coronis.

In 1635, the army of Odoardo I Farnese, Duke of Parma and Piacenza, allied with the French, defeated the Spaniards under the command of Don Gaspare Azevedo, who perished in the battle.

In more recent times, the railway bridge over the Curone was bombed several times by the Allies during World War II. In fact, the stretch of railway passing through Pontecurone is of great strategic importance as the Alessandria-Piacenza and Milan-Genoa lines run through it.

== Main sights ==
- Birthplace of Don Luigi Orione
- Villa Signorini, current seat of the Municipality
- Civic tower
- Church of Santa Maria Assunta, mentioned as early as the 12th century but already pre-existing
- Church of San Giovanni Battista
- Oratory of San Francesco

== Transport ==
Pontecurone is crossed in a westerly-easterly direction by the SS 10 Padana Inferiore road, which links Turin to Monselice. The SP 93 Pontecurone-Castelnuovo Scrivia, the SP 96 Pontecurone-Rivanazzano, the SP 97 Pontecurone-Volpedo and the SP 98 Pontecurone-Viguzzolo also branch off from the town.

Pontecurone has a railway station along the Alessandria-Piacenza and Milan-Genoa lines.

== People ==
- Giuseppe Arezzi (1917-)
- Saint Luigi Orione (1872–1940)
