= Avolasca =

- Comune
- Comune di Avolasca
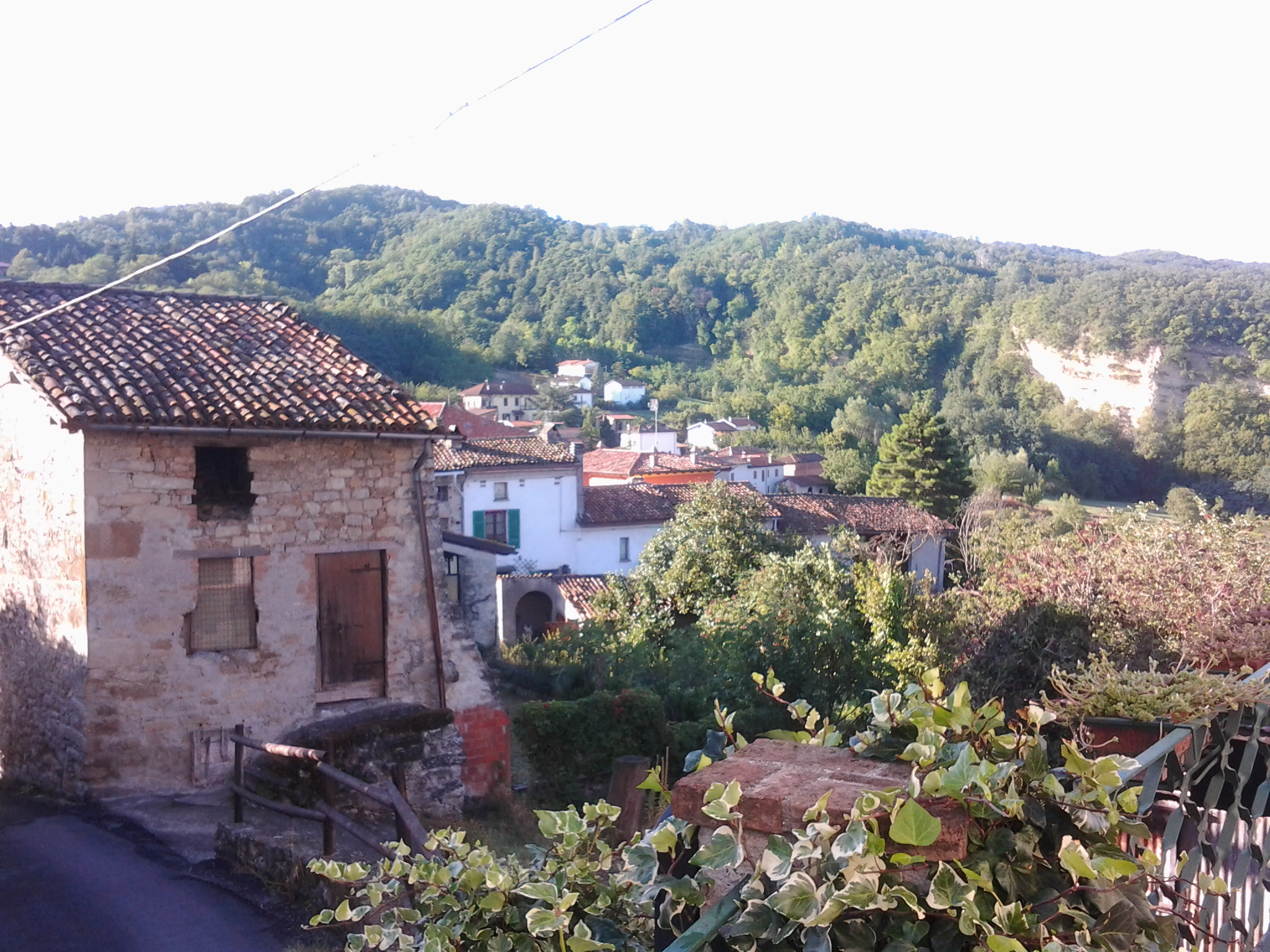

- Coat of arms

- Location within Italy Location within Piedmont
- Coordinates: 44°48′N 8°57′E
- Country: Italy
- Region: Piedmont
- Province: Alessandria (AL)
- Frazioni: Montebello, Grua, Baiarda, Casa Borella, Oliva, Tassare, Mereta, Pissine, Isolabella

Government
  - Mayor: Michele Gragnolati

Area
  - Total: 12.24 km^{2} (4.73 sq mi)
- Elevation: 451 m (1,480 ft)

Population (31 December 2018)
  - Total: 262
  - Density: 21.4/km^{2} (55.4/sq mi)
- Demonym: Avolaschesi
- Time zone: UTC+1 (CET)
  - Summer (DST): UTC+2 (CEST)
- Postal code: 15050
- Dialing code: 0131
- Website: Official website

Avolasca is a comune (municipality) in the Province of Alessandria in the Italian region Piedmont, located about 100 kilometres (62 mi) southeast of Turin and about 30 kilometres (19 mi) southeast of Alessandria.

Avolasca borders the following municipalities: Casasco, Castellania Coppi, Costa Vescovato, Garbagna, Montegioco, and Montemarzino.

== History ==
It appears with the toponyms Audelassum, Audelascum or Audelasci since the Longobard era among the possessions of the Abbey of San Colombano di Bobbio, included in the territory of the monastic court of Casasco. In the Middle Ages Avolasca belonged first to the committee and then to the episcopate of Tortona. Only later it was enfeoffed to several Genoese families and followed the events of the Grue valley.
