= Villalvernia =

- Comune
- Comune di Villalvernia
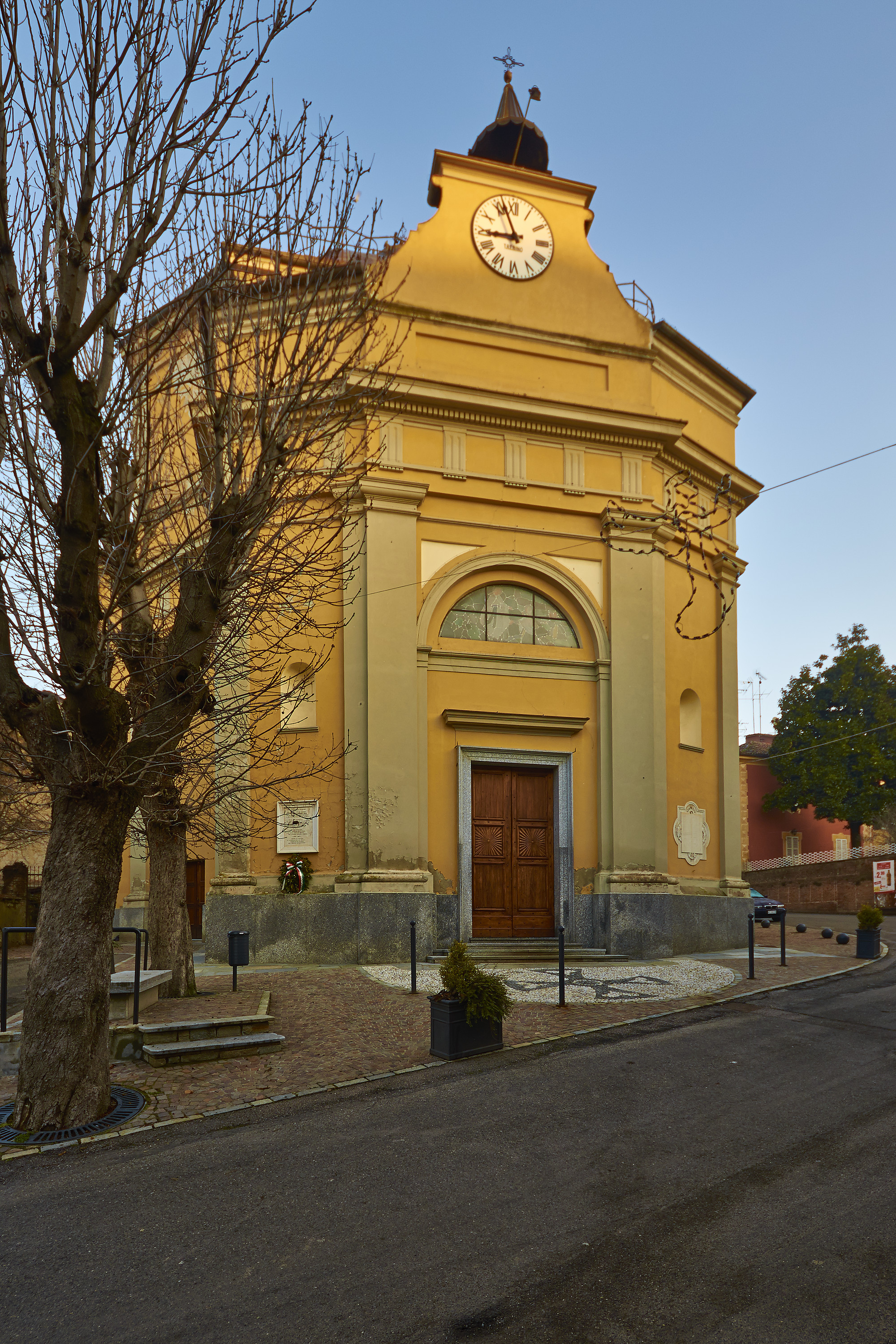

- Location within Italy Location within Piedmont
- Coordinates: 44°48′59″N 8°51′30″E
- Country: Italy
- Region: Piedmont
- Province: Alessandria (AL)
- Frazioni: Carezzano, Cassano Spinola, Pozzolo Formigaro, Tortona

Area
  - Total: 4.63 km^{2} (1.79 sq mi)
- Elevation: 193 m (633 ft)

Population (2005)
  - Total: 941
  - Density: 203/km^{2} (526/sq mi)
- Demonym: Villaverniesi
- Time zone: UTC+1 (CET)
  - Summer (DST): UTC+2 (CEST)
- Postal code: 15050
- Dialing code: 0131
- ISTAT code: 006183
- Saint day: 7 October
- Website: Official website

Villalvernia is a comune, population 932, in the province of Alessandria in Piedmont, Italy, situated in a hilly area on the right bank of the Scrivia.

== History ==
Probably founded during the 10th century, and simply called Villa, the town was partially enfeoffed to the bishops of Tortona by Pope Adrian IV (Nicholas Breakspear). In 1413 Filippo Maria Visconti enfeoffed it to Guglielmo d'Alvernia. The village remained with the Alvernias for 167 years, which explains the "alvernia" part of the placename.

In 1580, after the wedding of Francesco with Antonia Alvernia, the feud passed to the Spinola family. In 1652 the feudatories obtained the title of Marquess from Philip IV, King of Spain.

On 1 December 1944, the village was bombed by the United States Air Force; 105 inhabitants were killed and 253 were injured.
