= Costa Vescovato =

- Comune
- Comune di Costa Vescovato
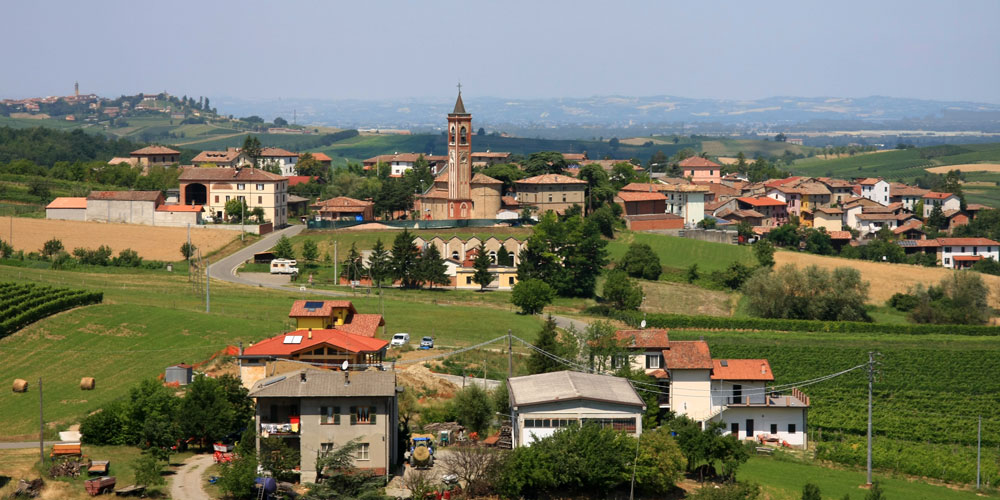
- View of the frazione of Montale Celli.

- Coat of arms

- Location within Italy Location within Piedmont
- Coordinates: 44°48′N 8°55′E
- Country: Italy
- Region: Piedmont
- Province: Alessandria (AL)
- Frazioni: Arpicella, Casale Montesoro, Cascina San Leto, Cascina Sposino, Montale Celli, Sarizzola

Government
  - Mayor: Ottavio Rube

Area
  - Total: 7.7 km^{2} (3.0 sq mi)
- Elevation: 305 m (1,001 ft)

Population (31 December 2010)
  - Total: 369
  - Density: 48/km^{2} (120/sq mi)
- Demonym: Costaioli
- Time zone: UTC+1 (CET)
  - Summer (DST): UTC+2 (CEST)
- Postal code: 15050
- Dialing code: 0131

Costa Vescovato is a comune (municipality) in the Province of Alessandria in the Italian region Piedmont, located about 100 kilometres (62 mi) southeast of Turin and about 25 kilometres (16 mi) southeast of Alessandria. It borders the municipalities of Avolasca, Carezzano, Castellania Coppi, Cerreto Grue, Montegioco, Paderna, and Villaromagnano.

== History ==
It was one of the territories subject to the temporal dominion of the Bishops of Tortona, hence the name that literally means "bishop's ridge". Subject, like the whole territory, to the expansionist aims of the Duchy of Milan, it was the scene of jurisdictional conflicts between the bishops and the Spanish government first and then the Savoy government. After the Napoleonic period it became definitively a territory of the Kingdom of Sardinia.
