= Sant'Agata Fossili =

- Comune
- Comune di Sant'Agata Fossili
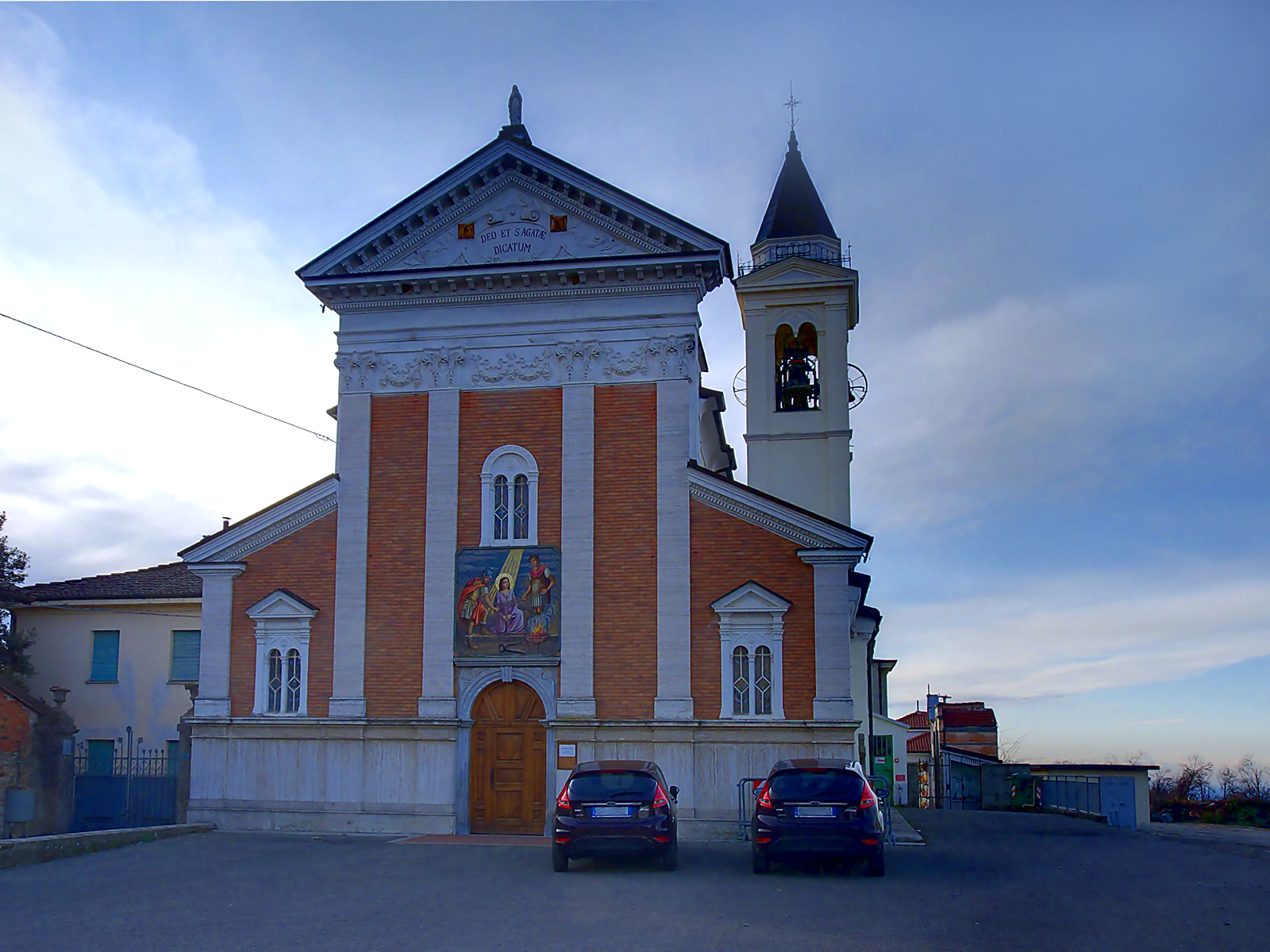

- Location within Italy Location within Piedmont
- Coordinates: 44°46′N 8°55′E
- Country: Italy
- Region: Piedmont
- Province: Province of Alessandria (AL)
- Frazioni: Podigliano, Torre Sterpi, Giusolana

Government
  - Mayor: Diego Camatti

Area
  - Total: 7.71 km^{2} (2.98 sq mi)
- Elevation: 425 m (1,394 ft)

Population (31 August 2022)
  - Total: 367
  - Density: 47.6/km^{2} (123/sq mi)
- Demonym: Santagatesi
- Time zone: UTC+1 (CET)
  - Summer (DST): UTC+2 (CEST)
- Postal code: 15050
- Dialing code: 0131
- Website: Official website

Sant'Agata Fossili is a comune (municipality) in the Province of Alessandria in the Italian region Piedmont, located about 100 kilometres (62 mi) southeast of Turin and about 30 kilometres (19 mi) southeast of Alessandria. As of 31 December 2004, it had a population of 425 and an area of 8.0 square kilometres (3.1 mi^{2}).

Sant'Agata Fossili borders the following municipalities: Carezzano, Cassano Spinola, Castellania Coppi, Sardigliano.
