= Montegioco =

- Comune
- Comune di Montegioco
- Location within Italy Location within Piedmont
- Coordinates: 44°50′N 8°58′E
- Country: Italy
- Region: Piedmont
- Province: Province of Alessandria (AL)

Area
  - Total: 5.4 km^{2} (2.1 sq mi)
- Elevation: 448 m (1,470 ft)

Population (Dec. 2004)
  - Total: 315
  - Density: 58/km^{2} (150/sq mi)
- Demonym: Montemarzinesi
- Time zone: UTC+1 (CET)
  - Summer (DST): UTC+2 (CEST)
- Postal code: 15050
- Dialing code: 0131

Montegioco is a comune (municipality) in the Province of Alessandria in the Italian region Piedmont, located about 100 kilometres (62 mi) east of Turin and about 30 kilometres (19 mi) southeast of Alessandria. As of 31 December 2004, it had a population of 315 and an area of 5.4 square kilometres (2.1 mi^{2}).

Montegioco borders the following municipalities: Avolasca, Cerreto Grue, Costa Vescovato, Monleale, Montemarzino, and Sarezzano.

== History ==
Mentioned for the first time in 1152, it was a locality in the district of Tortona, as recorded in the city statutes (14th century). In 1305 the castle of Montegioco was under the control of Pietro Opizzone. In 1406 it suffered serious damage from the Guelphs fighting against the Ghibelline party of the Visconti, supported by the Opizzone. No trace of its structures remains. In the 1541 census, there were 22 inhabitants, many of them massari (farmers) of the nobleman Antonio Francesco Opizzone. In 1576 the number of inhabitants in the parish had already risen to 200. The small community, upon payment of a substantial sum to the Ducal Chamber, avoided being enfeoffed in 1647 to Nicolò Busseti, but later renounced its autonomy and was enfeoffed to the brothers Biagio Gaetano and Carlo Alessandro, raising it to a marquisate from 22 September 1689 to which the lordship of Casasco was added (1698), then with the title of marquisate in 1773, Cerreto Grue (1693), Corneliasca (1698), Montebore, Oliva, Rocca del Grue, Montebello, Berzano di Tortona (1733). The Bussetti family also received imperial investiture for the villages of Segagliate, Palazzo Bussetti and Pragasso. In 1798 a republican municipality was constituted. In the royal decree of 1818 the municipality of Montegioco was included in the district of Volpedo.

In the locality of Palazzo, in the first half of the XVII century, a noble residence was built by the Busseti family of Tortona, equipped with extensive rustic buildings and a mill. Today, the palace has been renovated in the 20th century with the features of a castle surmounted by a crenellated tower and with the corners of the building adorned with bertesche, recently restored. Only a small bell gable bears witness to the building's 17th-century origins. Allodial property of the Busseti family, it passed into the hands of Emilio Signoris-Busseti (nominated in 1810 by Emperor Napoleon I as Baron of Montegioco), while after 1817, the year of his death, it remained in the hands of his widow Sofia Valesa and her daughter Eugenia Signoris married to Guasco di Bisio, who in 1881 sold it to Countess Luigia Veglio di Castelletto. From 1899 to 1933 it was owned by Countess "Pepita" Franzini Ribaldi, daughter of Countess Veglio, and then by the Di Bernardo heirs of Palermo, who owned it until the 1960s.

== Demographic evolution ==
Historical population

Year	Pop.	±%
1861	263	—
1871	275	+4.6%
1881	282	+2.5%
1901	323	+14.5%
1911	337	+4.3%

Year	Pop.	±%
1921	443	+31.5%
1931	453	+2.3%
1936	436	−3.8%
1951	418	−4.1%
1961	367	−12.2%

Year	Pop.	±%
1971	288	−21.5%
1981	250	−13.2%
1991	276	+10.4%
2001	306	+10.9%

Source: Data from ISTAT
