= Cassano Spinola =

- Comune
- Comune di Cassano Spinola
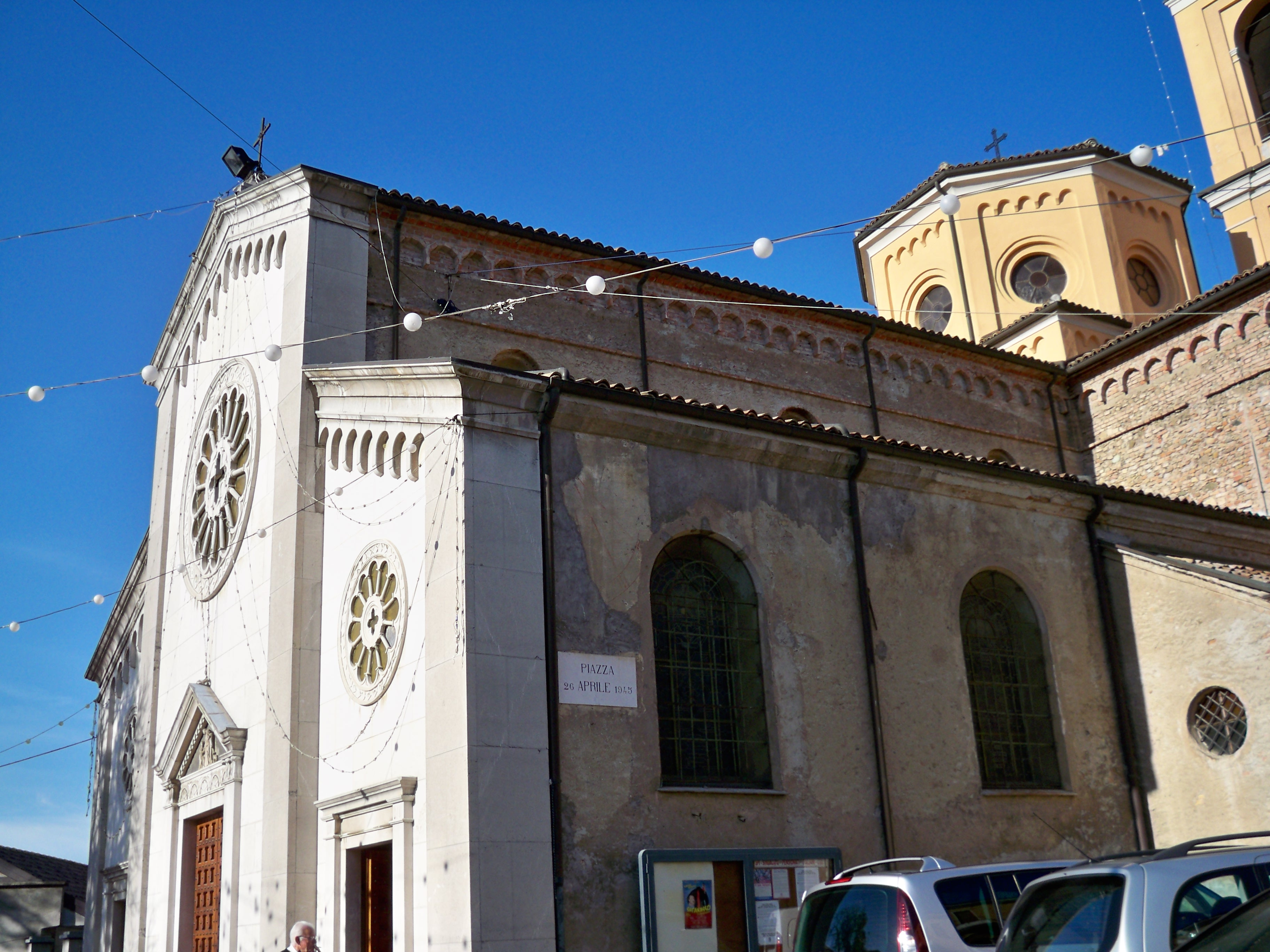
- Parish church.

- Location within Italy Location within Piedmont
- Coordinates: 44°45′N 8°51′E
- Country: Italy
- Region: Piedmont
- Province: Alessandria (AL)
- Frazioni: Gavazzana, Guacciorna, Santa Maria di Castiglione, Selva

Government
  - Mayor: Alessandro Busseti

Area
  - Total: 17.13 km^{2} (6.61 sq mi)
- Elevation: 191 m (627 ft)

Population (31 August 2022)
  - Total: 1,818
  - Density: 106.1/km^{2} (274.9/sq mi)
- Demonym: Cassanesi
- Time zone: UTC+1 (CET)
  - Summer (DST): UTC+2 (CEST)
- Postal code: 15063
- Dialing code: 0143
- Website: Official website

Cassano Spinola is a comune (municipality) in the Province of Alessandria in the Italian region Piedmont, located about 100 kilometres (62 mi) southeast of Turin and about 25 kilometres (16 mi) southeast of Alessandria.

Cassano Spinola borders the following municipalities: Carezzano, Novi Ligure, Pozzolo Formigaro, Sant'Agata Fossili, Sardigliano, Serravalle Scrivia, Stazzano, and Villalvernia.
