= Ezia Gavazza =

Italian art historian (1928–2019)

Ezia Gavazza (1928-18 April 2019) was an Italian art historian. Along with her friends and colleagues Lauro Magnani and Piero Boccardo, she was one of the most prolific writers in Genoa on Baroque art. She specialised in the Ligurian Baroque, particularly Domenico Piola, Giulio Benso, Giovanni Andrea Ansaldo, Grechetto and Bernardo Strozzi.

== Life ==
Born in Pozzolo Formigaro, for several years she held the chair in Modern Art History at the University of Genoa before being made Professor Emerita by minister Fabio Mussi. She was a city counsellor for the PCI and also took a major part in Genoa's cultural life by organising exhibitions, publications and specialist conferences. In her final years she settled in the historic city centre of Genoa and continued to collaborate in the city's cultural and academic life. She died in Genoa aged 91.

She trained several important art critics, art historians and academics such as Lauro Magnani and Piero Boccardo, director of Genoa's Strada Nuova Museums. Two monographs were published to mark her retirement, marking her importance in Genoese and wider scholarship. She and other Genoese art historians also carried out major research on several paintings in the city's Zerbone collection.

Her method of artistic investigation derived from the methodology of Aby Warburg and his iconological school and following the "Arganiani" (i.e. supporters of Giulio Carlo Argan's method). She also investigated the complex web of relationships between the Genoese and Roman schools through looking at long and short visits to Rome by individual Genoese artists. In 2011 she and her colleague Lauro Magnani looked at Genoese nunneries (now mostly suppressed, demolished or in secular use) through an art-historical lens to reconstruct the city's urban and social appearance in the 16th and 17th centuries, studies which culminated in Monasteri femminili a Genova tra il XVI e il XVII secolo, published by Diras di Genova.

== Major contributions ==
- La grande decorazione a Genova, Sagep, [1974]
- Lo spazio dipinto. Il grande affresco genovese nel Seicento, Sagep, 1989
- (with Federica Lamera e Lauro Magnani) La pittura in Liguria. Il secondo Seicento, Cassa di Risparmio di Genova e Imperia, 1990
- (with Giovanna Rotondi Terminiello) Genova nell'età barocca, Skira, 1994
- (with other authors) Catalogue of an exhibition on Bernardo Strozzi, Electa, 1995
- (with Lauro Magnani and Giovanna Rotondi Terminiello) catalogue of a Zerbone collection exhibition on Gregorio De Ferrari and Giovan Battista Gaulli (known as il Baciccio), 2000
- (with Lauro Magnani) Pittura e decorazione a Genova e in Liguria nel Settecento, Sagep, 2000
- (with Lauro Magnani and Giovanna Rotondi Terminiello) Galleria dell'Accademia di Venezia. Disegni genovesi, Electa, 2002
- L'età di Rubens, collaboration on an exhibition catalogue, edited by Piero Boccardo, Skira, 2004
