= Paderna =

- Comune
- Comune di Paderna
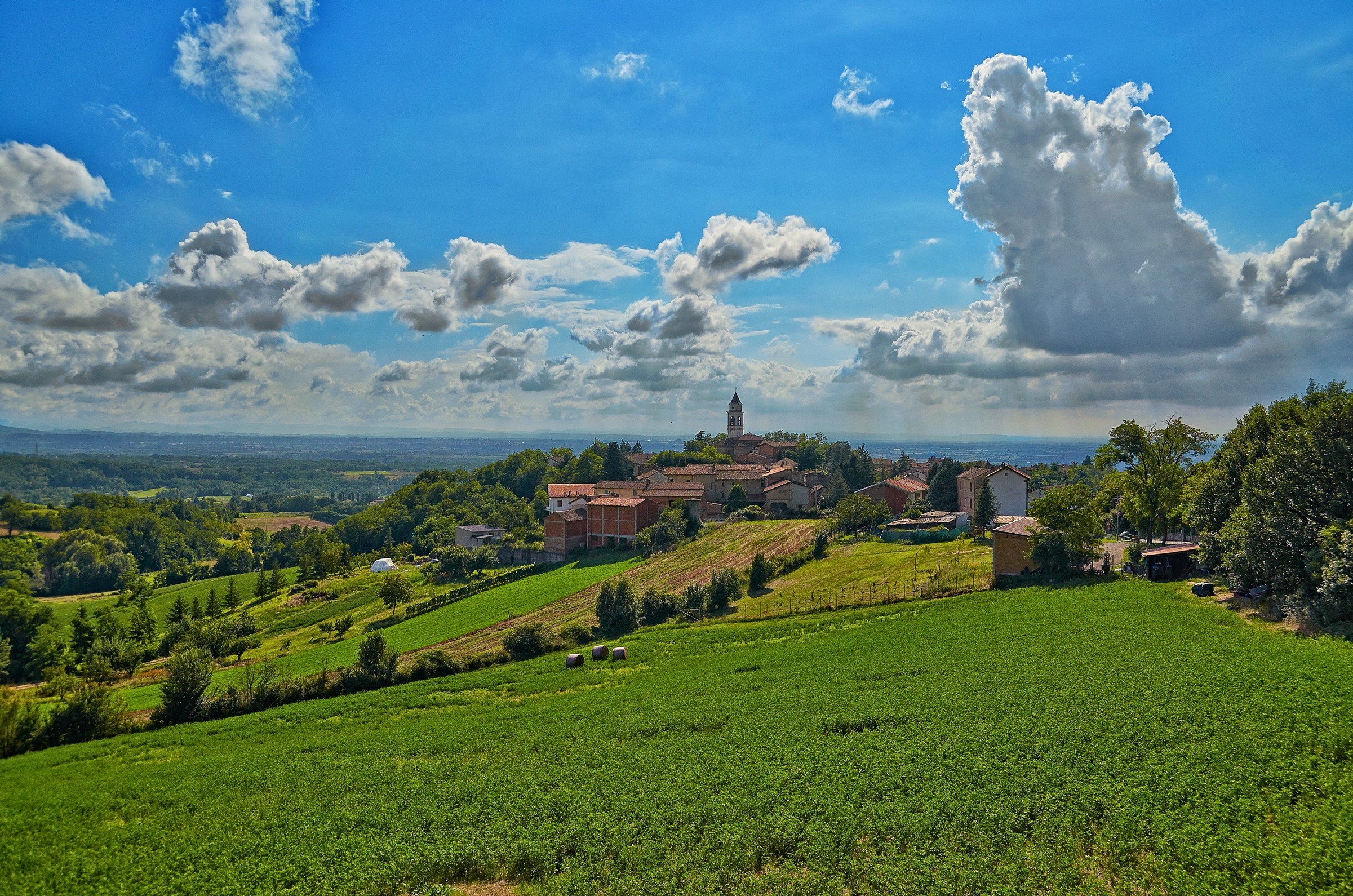

- Location within Italy Location within Piedmont
- Coordinates: 44°49′N 8°53′E
- Country: Italy
- Region: Piedmont
- Province: Alessandria (AL)

Government
  - Mayor: Matteo Gualco

Area
  - Total: 4.42 km^{2} (1.71 sq mi)
- Elevation: 300 m (980 ft)

Population (30 November 0271)
  - Total: 205
  - Density: 46.4/km^{2} (120/sq mi)
- Demonym: Padernesi
- Time zone: UTC+1 (CET)
  - Summer (DST): UTC+2 (CEST)
- Postal code: 15050
- Dialing code: 0131
- Website: Official website

Paderna is a comune (municipality) in the Province of Alessandria in the Italian region Piedmont, located about 100 kilometres (62 mi) southeast of Turin and about 25 kilometres (16 mi) southeast of Alessandria.

Paderna borders the following municipalities: Carezzano, Costa Vescovato, Spineto Scrivia, Tortona, and Villaromagnano.
