= Timorasso =

Variety of wine grape

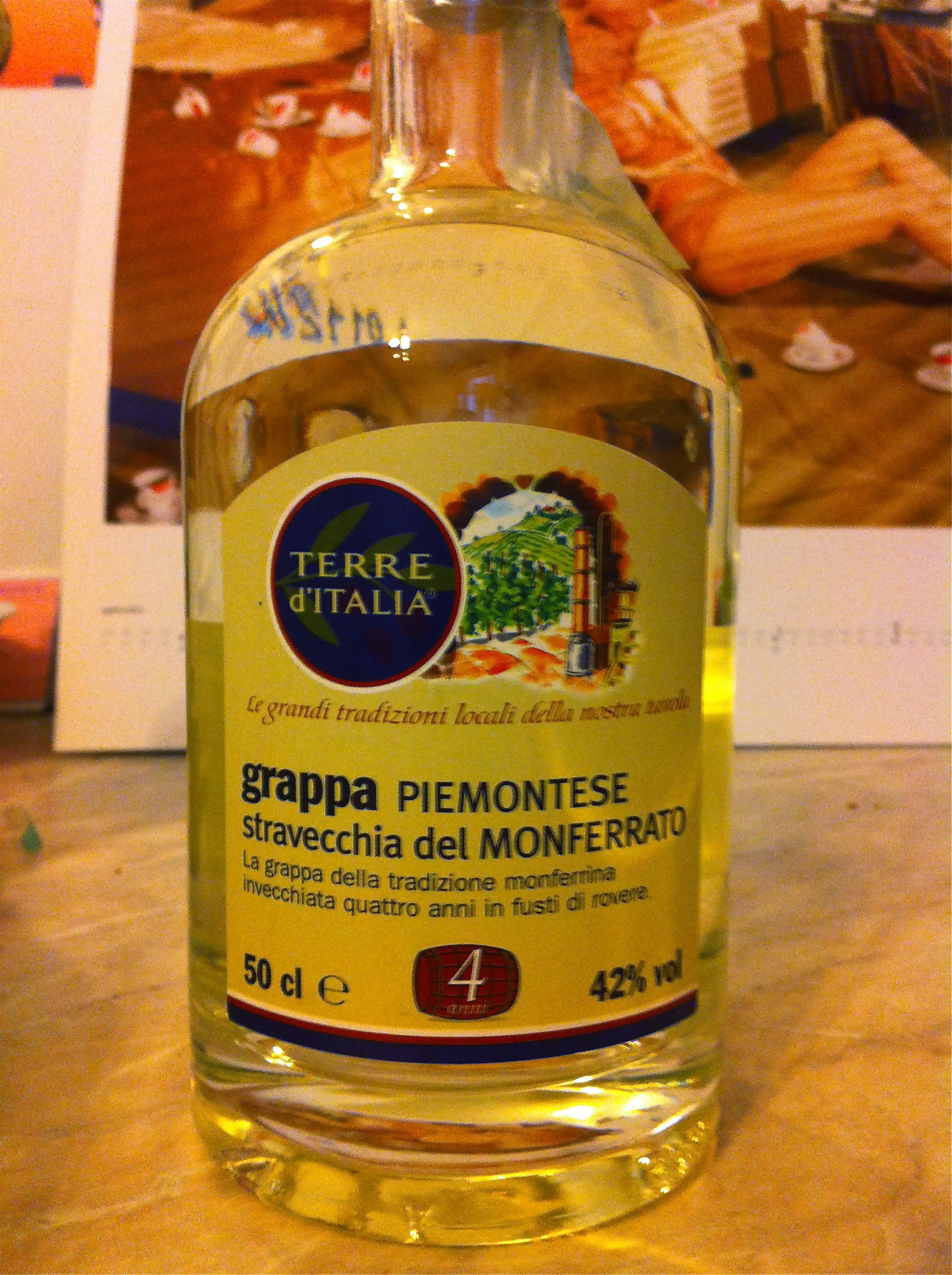
The pomace of Timorasso is often used in the production of Piemontese grappa.

Timorasso is a white Italian grape variety grown primarily in the Piedmont wine region of northwest Italy. There it is used to make aromatic wine with some ageing potential as well as the pomace brandy speciality of grappa. Timorasso owes its modern-day existence to Walter Massa, a farmer of Monleale, a village in Piedmont, as the thick-skinned native variety was almost extinct in the early 1980s in the area of Tortona. Thanks to Massa's pioneering efforts, by the late 1990s, other local producers began planting the grape variety themselves and there are now more than 20 firms growing and producing Timorasso.

== Synonyms ==
Over the years Timorasso has been known under a variety of synonyms including: Morasso, Timuassa, Timoraccio, Timorazza and Timorosso.
