= Giulio Benso =

Italian painter (1592–1668)

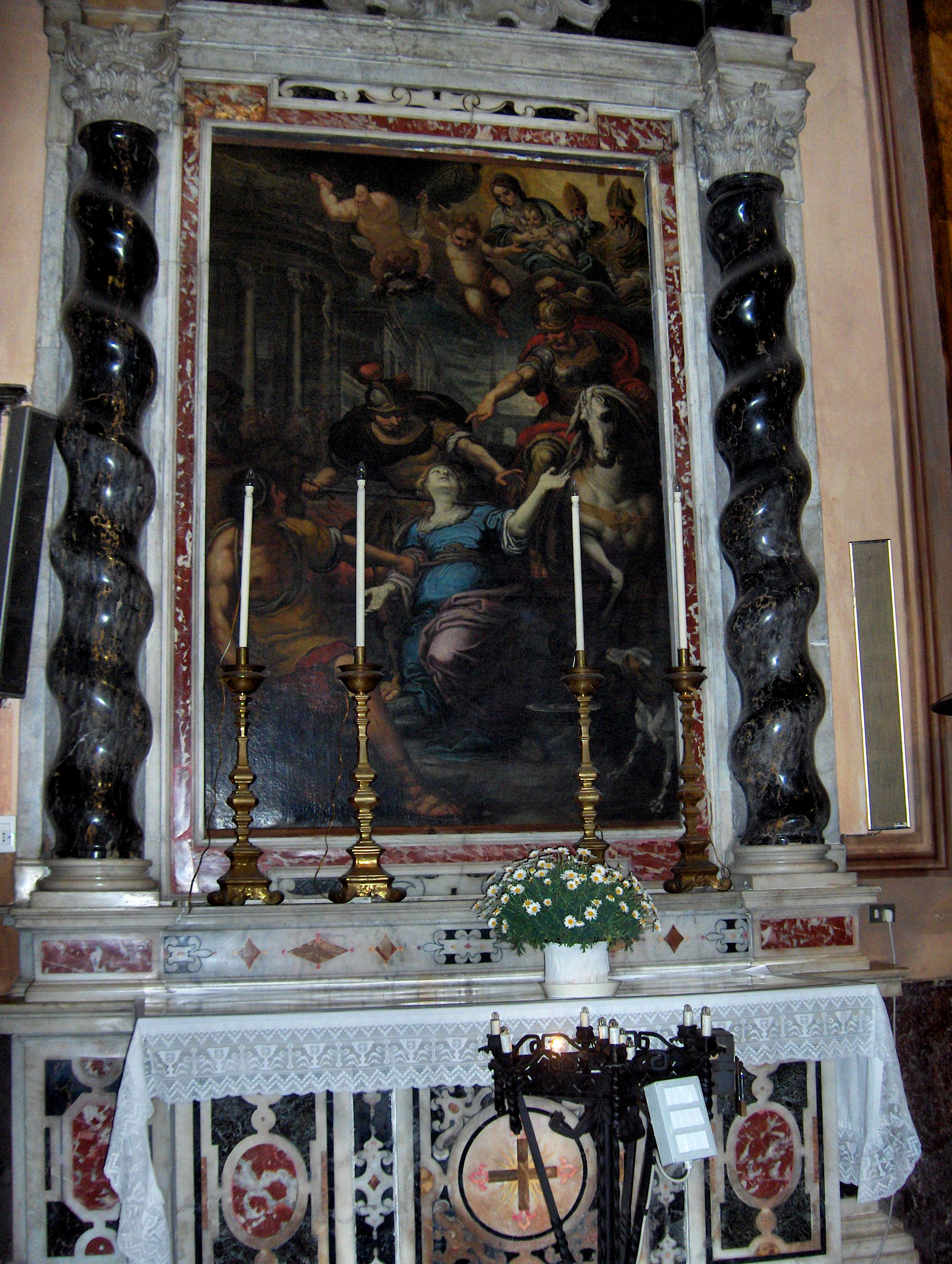
Martyrdom of St. Lucy of Syracuse in the Church of Sant'Ambrogio, Alassio

Giulio Benso (30 October 1592 – 1668) was a Genovese painter of the early Baroque. He is known as one of the followers of the style of Luca Cambiasi.

Benso was born in Pieve di Teco. Initially under the patronage of Giovanni Carl Doria, he met Giulio Cesare Procaccini and was encouraged to study in the Genovese Accademia del Nudo. Afterwards, he was apprenticed to Giovanni Battista Paggi. Apart from his work in Liguria, he decorated the Palazzo Grimaldi in Cagnes-sur-Mer with the Fall of Phaeton and sent works to the Abbey of Weingarten in Germany. In the 1640s, he completed his masterpiece, a fresco in the presbytery and apse of the church of the Basilica della Santissima Annunziata del Vastato. There are also paintings of his in his hometown of Pieve di Teco as well as in the parish church of Sant'Ambrogio in Alassio.

== Sources ==
- (in Italian) Venancio Belloni, Pittura genovese del Seicento. Dal Manierismo al Barocco, EMMEBI, Genoa, 1969.
- (in Italian) Ezia Gavazza, La grande decorazione a Genova, Sagep, Genoa, 1974.
- (in Italian) Raffaele Soprani, Le vite de pittori, scoltori, et architetti genovesi. E de' Forastieri, che in Genova operarono, Bottaro e Tiboldi, Genova, 1674, pp. 268–272.
