= Carbonara Scrivia =

Municipality in Piedmont, Italy

- Comune
- Comune di Carbonara Scrivia
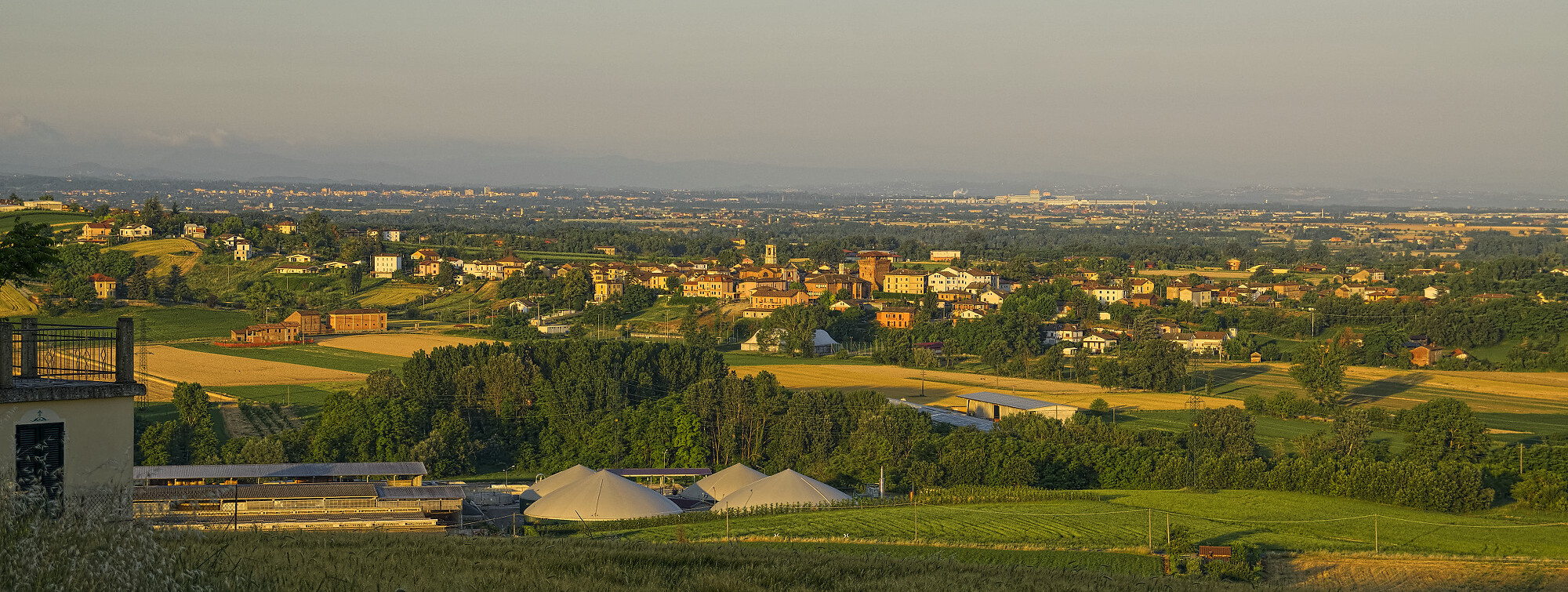

- Coat of arms

- Location within Italy Location within Piedmont
- Coordinates: 44°51′N 8°52′E
- Country: Italy
- Region: Piedmont
- Province: Alessandria (AL)

Government
  - Mayor: Flaviano Gnudi

Area
  - Total: 5.05 km^{2} (1.95 sq mi)
- Elevation: 177 m (581 ft)

Population (31 May 2017)
  - Total: 1,125
  - Density: 223/km^{2} (577/sq mi)
- Demonym: Carbonaresi
- Time zone: UTC+1 (CET)
  - Summer (DST): UTC+2 (CEST)
- Postal code: 15050
- Dialing code: 0131
- Website: Official website

Carbonara Scrivia is a comune (municipality) in the Province of Alessandria in the Italian region Piedmont, located about 100 kilometres (62 mi) east of Turin and about 20 kilometres (12 mi) southeast of Alessandria.

Carbonara Scrivia borders the following municipalities: Spineto Scrivia, Tortona, and Villaromagnano.
