= Sarezzano =

Sarezzano Sarsòu
- Comune
- Comune di Sarezzano
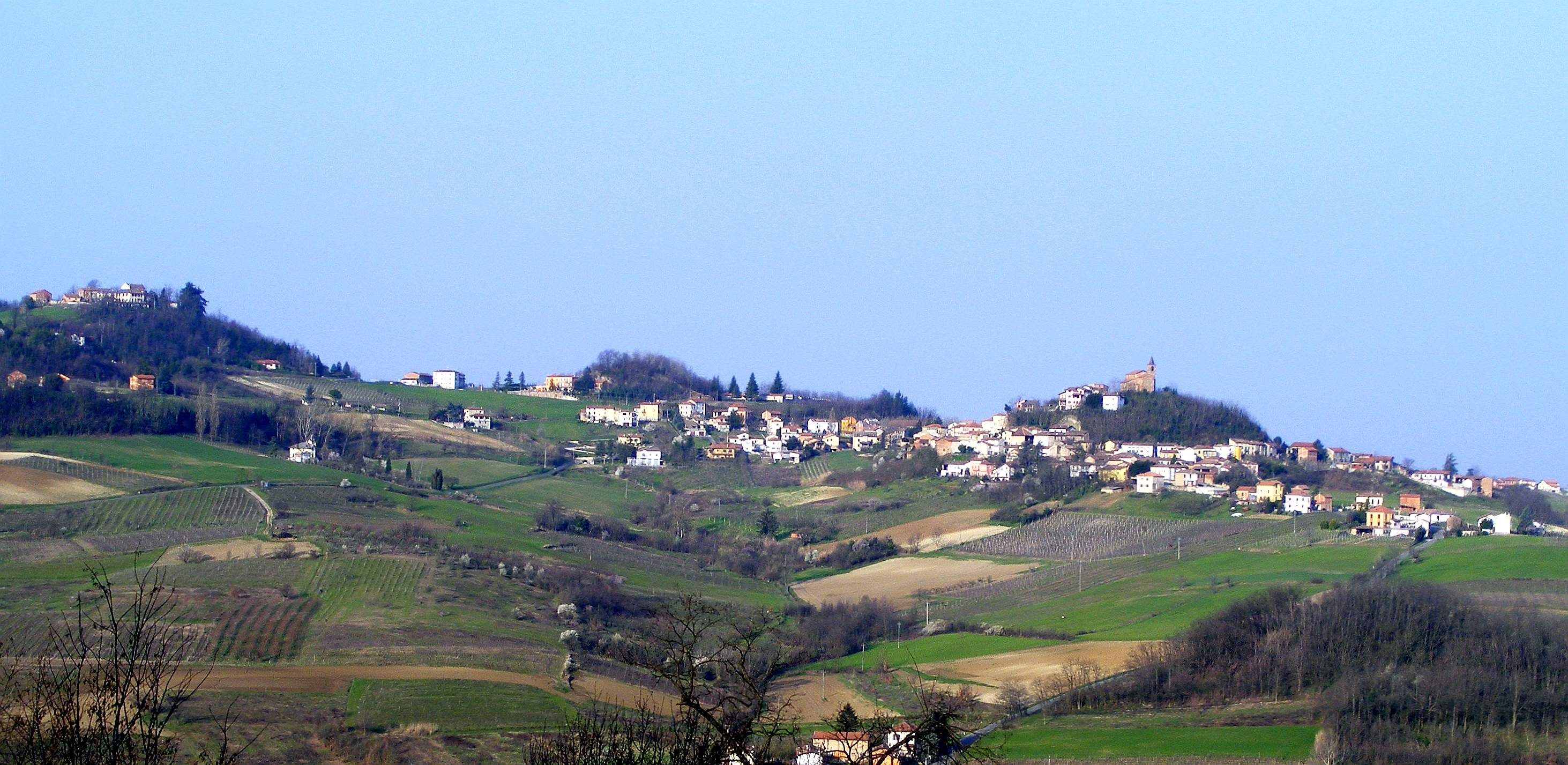

- Location within Italy Location within Piedmont
- Coordinates: 44°52′N 8°55′E
- Country: Italy
- Region: Piedmont
- Province: Province of Alessandria (AL)
- Frazioni: Baracca, Cucco, Palazzina, Rocca Grue, San Ruffino, Sant'Innocenzo

Area
  - Total: 13.8 km^{2} (5.3 sq mi)
- Elevation: 300 m (980 ft)

Population (Dec. 2004)
  - Total: 1,171
  - Density: 84.9/km^{2} (220/sq mi)
- Demonym: Sarezzanesi
- Time zone: UTC+1 (CET)
  - Summer (DST): UTC+2 (CEST)
- Postal code: 15050
- Dialing code: 0131

Sarezzano (Western Lombard: Sarsòu) is a comune (municipality) in the Province of Alessandria in the Italian region Piedmont, located about 100 kilometres (62 mi) east of Turin and about 25 kilometres (16 mi) east of Alessandria. As of 31 December 2004, it had a population of 1,171 and an area of 13.8 square kilometres (5.3 mi^{2}).

The municipality of Sarezzano contains the frazioni (subdivisions, mainly villages and hamlets) Baracca, Cucco, Palazzina, Rocca Grue, San Ruffino, and Sant'Innocenzo.

Sarezzano borders the following municipalities: Berzano di Tortona, Cerreto Grue, Monleale, Montegioco, Tortona, Viguzzolo, and Villaromagnano.

== History ==
Various finds have been unearthed in the municipal area, testifying to settlements from Roman times. The place was chosen as a hermitage by the monks Ruffino and Venanzio, who were buried there. Their remains, originally kept in the Parish Church of St. Michael, were later moved to the castle church. In the Middle Ages, the town belonged to the lordship of the bishops of Tortona and was therefore linked to the Guelph party. From the 15th century to the end of the 18th century it was a feud of the Guidobono Cavalchini family, after which, together with the whole Tortona area, it passed to the Kingdom of Sardinia. In 1855, the former castle church (which had been seriously damaged by lightning in 1610 and then rebuilt) was elevated to the status of parish church. It was then replaced in the 1950s by a new building, at the foot of the hill where the castle stood, dedicated to Saints Ruffino and Venanzio. The church was found in the church in 1585.

In 1585, the Codex Purpureus was found in the village church, next to the remains of Saints Ruffino and Venanzio. It is an early medieval codex of fine workmanship consisting of 72 sheets with the text of the four gospels. Written in the 5th or 6th century on reddish parchment, it is contained in a wooden case and was found again after being lost in 1872.

== Demographic evolution ==
Historical population

| Year | Pop. | ±% |
|---|---|---|
| 1861 | 1,097 | — |
| 1871 | 1,220 | +11.2% |
| 1881 | 1,316 | +7.9% |
| 1901 | 1,494 | +13.5% |
| 1911 | 1,624 | +8.7% |

| Year | Pop. | ±% |
|---|---|---|
| 1921 | 1,556 | −4.2% |
| 1931 | 1,643 | +5.6% |
| 1936 | 1,604 | −2.4% |
| 1951 | 1,538 | −4.1% |
| 1961 | 1,450 | −5.7% |

| Year | Pop. | ±% |
|---|---|---|
| 1971 | 1,215 | −16.2% |
| 1981 | 1,099 | −9.5% |
| 1991 | 1,086 | −1.2% |
| 2001 | 1,156 | +6.4% |

Source: Data from ISTAT
