= Monleale =

- Comune
- Comune di Monleale
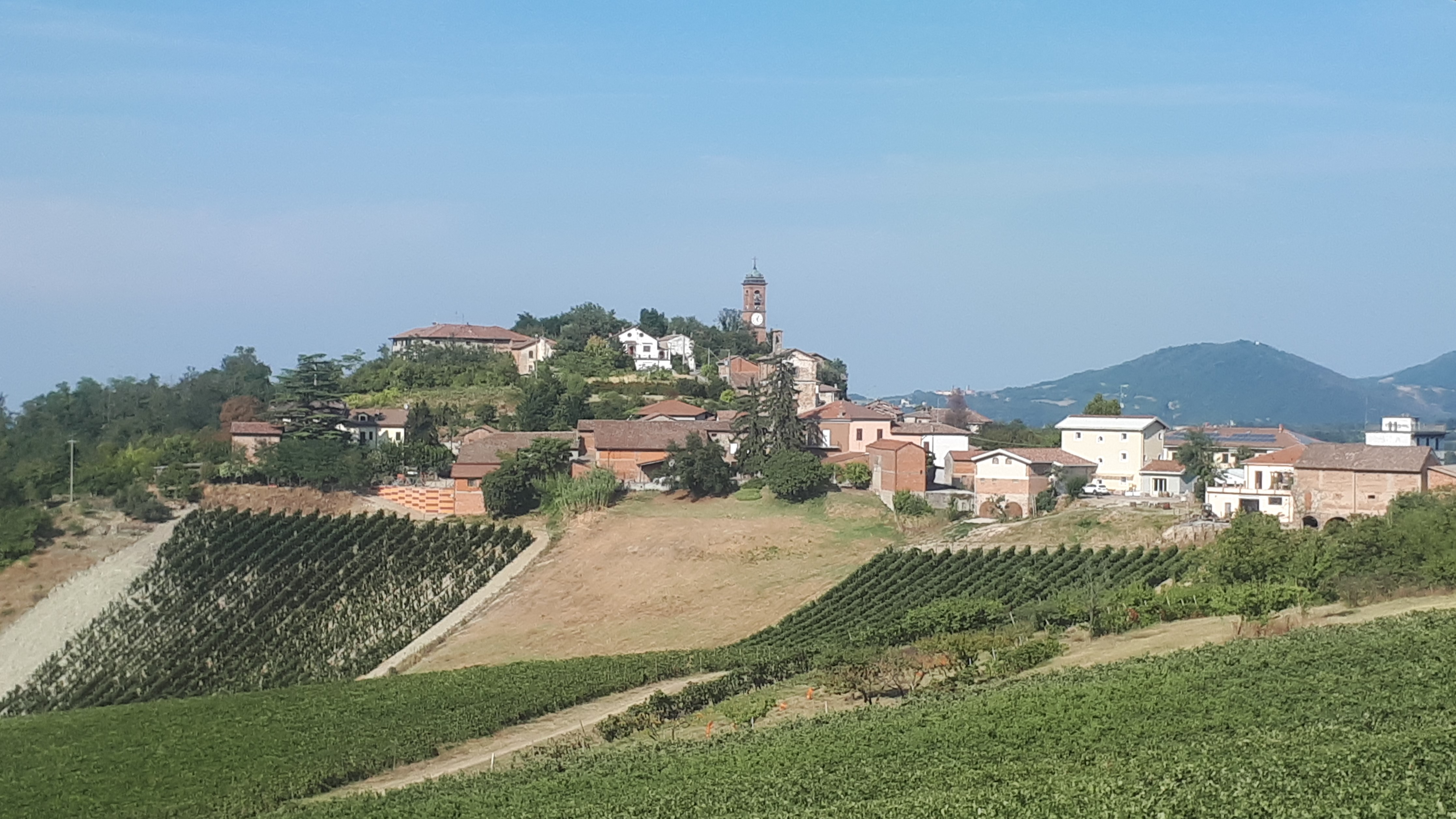

- Coat of arms

- Location within Italy Location within Piedmont
- Coordinates: 44°53′N 8°58′E
- Country: Italy
- Region: Piedmont
- Province: Alessandria (AL)
- Frazioni: Bellaria, Cadaborgo, Casavecchia, Cenelli, Cusinasco, Poggio, Profigate, Repregosi, Valmaia, Ville

Government
  - Mayor: Paola Massa

Area
  - Total: 9.6 km^{2} (3.7 sq mi)
- Elevation: 305 m (1,001 ft)

Population (31 December 2017)
  - Total: 558
  - Density: 58/km^{2} (150/sq mi)
- Demonym: Monlealesi
- Time zone: UTC+1 (CET)
  - Summer (DST): UTC+2 (CEST)
- Postal code: 15059
- Dialing code: 0131
- Website: Official website

Monleale is a comune (municipality) in the Province of Alessandria in the Italian region Piedmont, located about 100 kilometres (62 mi) east of Turin and about 30 kilometres (19 mi) east of Alessandria.

Monleale borders the following municipalities: Berzano di Tortona, Montegioco, Montemarzino, Sarezzano, Volpedo, and Volpeglino.

== History ==
Mentioned in documents of 1172, when some nobles of Volpedo obtained it as a feud from the bishop of Tortona Oberto and from the Tortona consuls. From 1412 it was enfeoffed to Perino Cameri and maintained by his descendants until 1727, who were succeeded by the Calcamuggi family of Alessandria. Always a rival of the nearby Volpedo, in 1513 the Ghibelline Monleale attacked and destroyed the Guelph village on the other side of the river.

== Main sights ==
- At the top of the hill stands the ancient oratory of the Beata Vergine del Gonfalone. It was built at the beginning of the 18th century and finished in 1742 by order of Count Pietro Guidobone. In this oratory the confraternity of the Beata Vergine del Gonfalone, disciplined according to the rule of San Carlo, with twenty confreres dressed in a white cape, takes part in processions and public functions.
- In the place known as Cà del Pep, until the beginning of the XXI century, there was a centuries-old downy oak tree, now dried up, considered a veteran tree, whose trunk had reached 575 cm.

== Economy ==
The economy is predominantly agricultural. Monleale is home to the Volpedo Frutta cooperative, which brings together local producers and holds a number of trademarks related to the area's fruits.

Since the 1990s some local farms have specialized in the cultivation of Timorasso.
