= Viguzzolo =

- Comune
- Comune di Viguzzolo
- Location within Italy Location within Piedmont
- Coordinates: 44°54′N 8°55′E
- Country: Italy
- Region: Piedmont
- Province: Province of Alessandria (AL)

Area
  - Total: 18.3 km^{2} (7.1 sq mi)
- Elevation: 128 m (420 ft)

Population (Dec. 2004)
  - Total: 2,964
  - Density: 162/km^{2} (419/sq mi)
- Demonym: Viguzzolesi
- Time zone: UTC+1 (CET)
  - Summer (DST): UTC+2 (CEST)
- Postal code: 15058
- Dialing code: 0131
- Website: Official website

Viguzzolo is a comune (municipality) in the Province of Alessandria in the Italian region Piedmont, located about 100 kilometres (62 mi) east of Turin and about 25 kilometres (16 mi) east of Alessandria. As of 31 December 2004, it had a population of 2,964 and an area of 18.3 square kilometres (7.1 mi^{2}).

Viguzzolo borders the following municipalities: Berzano di Tortona, Casalnoceto, Castellar Guidobono, Pontecurone, Sarezzano, Tortona, and Volpeglino.

== History ==
Already mentioned in ninth-century documents, it was a free commune and in 1278 obtained Tortona citizenship. Together with Tortona, it became part of the Visconti possessions. With the arrival of the Sforza family, it was forced into public submission, under threat of destruction. It was granted as a fief to the Fogliani family of Piacenza in 1468, and remained in the hands of this family even after it passed to the Savoys.

== Main sights ==
- The parish church of Assunta is an extension (1598–1603) of the oratory of San Bartolomeo. The Baroque façade has a portal with a broken tympanum; the three-nave interior has a high altar from the church of San Marziano in Tortona. There is also an oratory.
- The Annunziata Monastery dates back to the 15th century; it housed nuns of the order and rule of St Augustine and was suppressed in 1770 by Pope Clement XIV. Today it is the seat of the municipality, schools and the civic library.
- The parish church of Santa Maria is the most important monument in Viguzzolo. It is a simple Romanesque building with three naves, three semicircular apses and a double-pitched roof. The façade, decorated with small hanging arches divided irregularly by pilasters, has a round-arched door and a circular eye, probably built, like the small bell gable, in a later period. Inside, the naves are divided into four bays of quadrangular pillars with opposing half-columns. In the right aisle there is access to the crypt, made up of three small naves marked by small columns and stone capitals supporting cross vaults. The parish church is owned by the Municipality of Viguzzolo and is normally closed to the public.

== Demographic evolution ==
Historical population

Year	Pop.	±%
1861	2,493	—
1871	2,615	+4.9%
1881	2,488	−4.9%
1901	2,573	+3.4%
1911	2,655	+3.2%

Year	Pop.	±%
1921	2,822	+6.3%
1931	2,552	−9.6%
1936	2,499	−2.1%
1951	2,593	+3.8%
1961	2,921	+12.6%

Year	Pop.	±%
1971	2,880	−1.4%
1981	3,121	+8.4%
1991	3,036	−2.7%
2001	2,884	−5.0%

Source: Data from ISTAT
