= Cerreto Grue =

- Comune
- Comune di Cerreto Grue
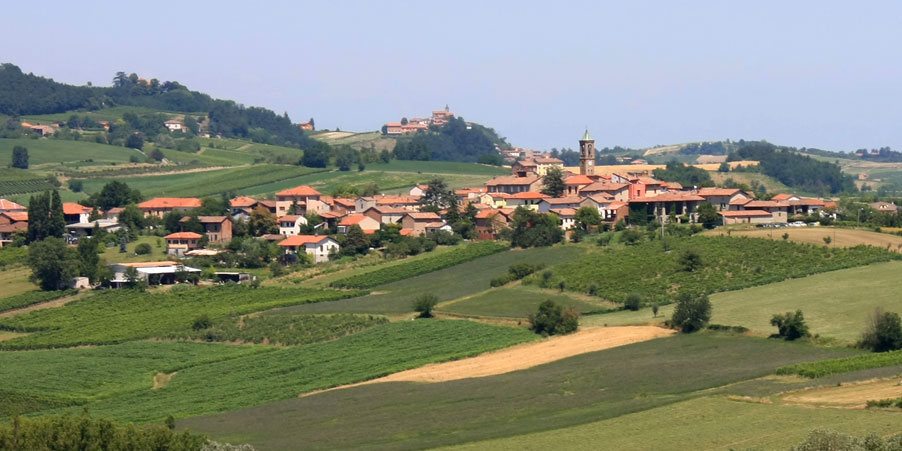

- Location within Italy Location within Piedmont
- Coordinates: 44°51′N 8°56′E
- Country: Italy
- Region: Piedmont
- Province: Province of Alessandria (AL)

Area
  - Total: 4.8 km^{2} (1.9 sq mi)

Population (Dec. 2004)
  - Total: 346
  - Density: 72/km^{2} (190/sq mi)
- Time zone: UTC+1 (CET)
  - Summer (DST): UTC+2 (CEST)
- Postal code: 15050
- Dialing code: 0131

Cerreto Grue is a comune (municipality) in the Province of Alessandria in the Italian region Piedmont, located about 100 kilometres (62 mi) east of Turin and about 25 kilometres (16 mi) southeast of Alessandria. As of 31 December 2004, it had a population of 346 and an area of 4.8 square kilometres (1.9 mi^{2}).

Cerreto Grue borders the following municipalities: Costa Vescovato, Montegioco, Sarezzano, and Villaromagnano.

== Demographic evolution ==
Historical population

Year	Pop.	±%
1861	448	—
1871	457	+2.0%
1881	466	+2.0%
1901	550	+18.0%
1911	591	+7.5%

Year	Pop.	±%
1921	654	+10.7%
1931	599	−8.4%
1936	587	−2.0%
1951	598	+1.9%
1961	553	−7.5%

Year	Pop.	±%
1971	452	−18.3%
1981	382	−15.5%
1991	360	−5.8%
2001	339	−5.8%

Source: Data from ISTAT
