= Spineto Scrivia =

- Comune
- Comune di Spineto Scrivia
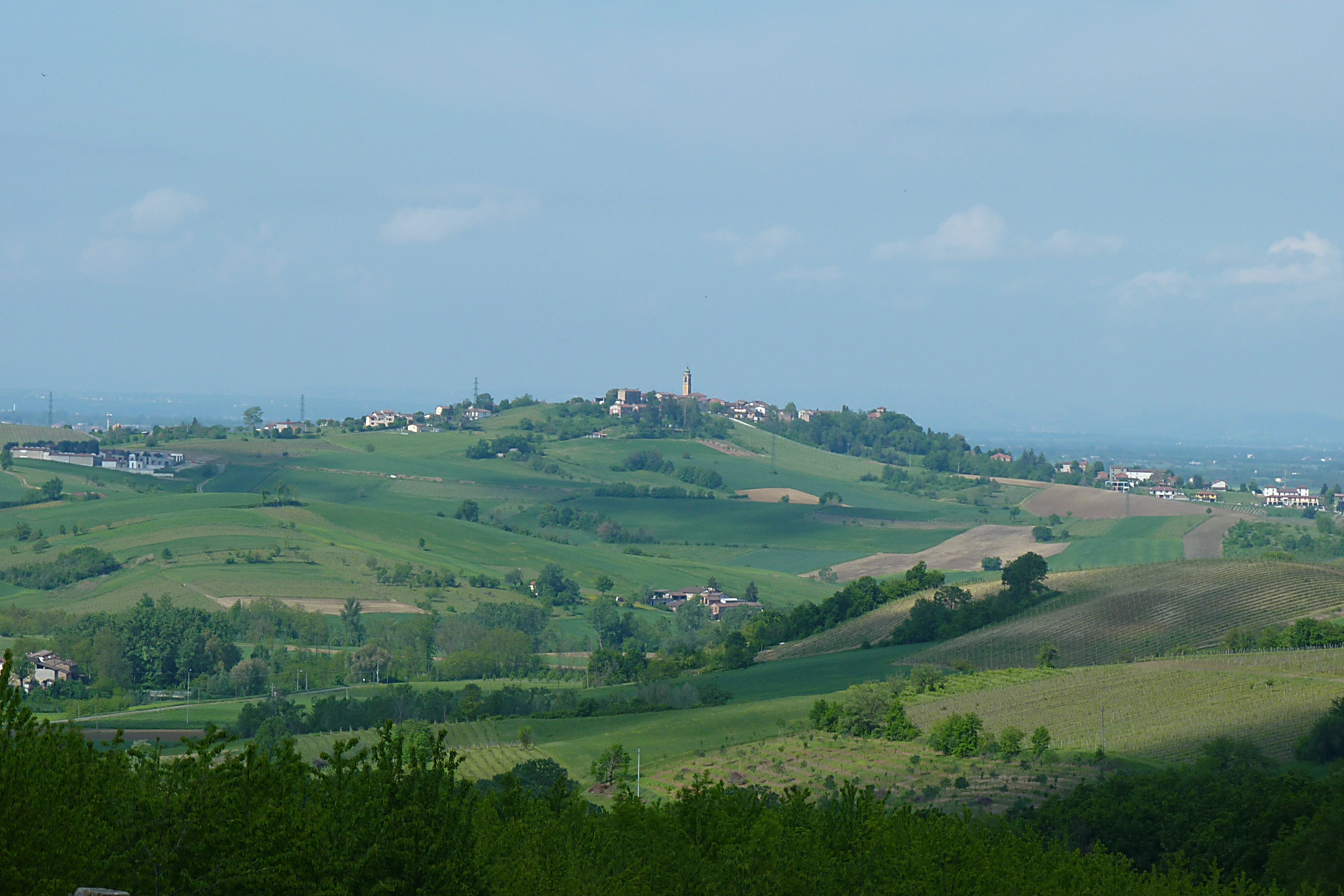

- Coat of arms

- Location within Italy Location within Piedmont
- Coordinates: 44°50′N 8°52′E
- Country: Italy
- Region: Piedmont
- Province: Alessandria (AL)

Government
  - Mayor: Giuseppe Artana

Area
  - Total: 3.95 km^{2} (1.53 sq mi)
- Elevation: 260 m (850 ft)

Population (31 October 2018)
  - Total: 367
  - Density: 92.9/km^{2} (241/sq mi)
- Demonym: Spinetesi
- Time zone: UTC+1 (CET)
  - Summer (DST): UTC+2 (CEST)
- Postal code: 15050
- Dialing code: 0131
- Website: Official website

Spineto Scrivia is a comune (municipality) in the Province of Alessandria in the Italian region Piedmont, located about 100 kilometres (62 mi) southeast of Turin and about 20 kilometres (12 mi) southeast of Alessandria.

Spineto Scrivia borders the following municipalities: Carbonara Scrivia, Paderna, Tortona, and Villaromagnano.
