= Casalnoceto =

- Comune
- Comune di Casalnoceto
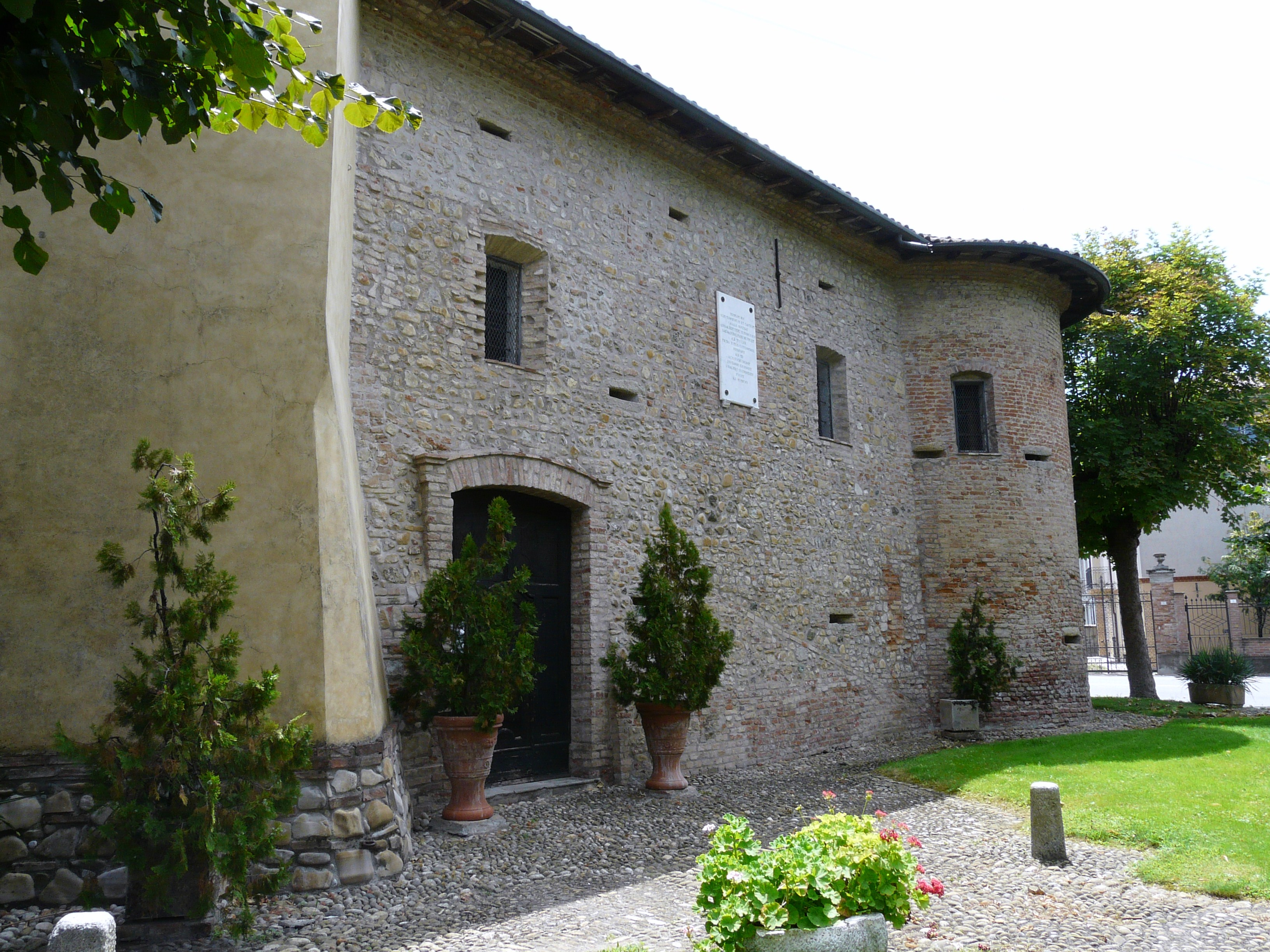

- Location within Italy Location within Piedmont
- Coordinates: 44°55′N 8°59′E
- Country: Italy
- Region: Piedmont
- Province: Alessandria (AL)

Government
  - Mayor: Giuseppe Cetta

Area
  - Total: 12.98 km^{2} (5.01 sq mi)
- Elevation: 159 m (522 ft)

Population (31 May 2017)
  - Total: 959
  - Density: 73.9/km^{2} (191/sq mi)
- Demonym: Casalnocetesi
- Time zone: UTC+1 (CET)
  - Summer (DST): UTC+2 (CEST)
- Postal code: 15052
- Dialing code: 0131
- Website: Official website

Casalnoceto is a comune (municipality) in the Province of Alessandria in the Italian region Piedmont, located about 100 kilometres (62 mi) east of Turin and about 30 kilometres (19 mi) east of Alessandria.

Casalnoceto borders the following municipalities: Castellar Guidobono, Godiasco, Pontecurone, Rivanazzano Terme, Viguzzolo, Volpedo, and Volpeglino.

== History ==
The ancient Nocetum was located along an ancient road, in the current location of Casale vecchio, and its origins date back to Roman times. Documents between 8th and 13th century mention both Casale and Nocetum as two different locations. Nocetum in 972 is confirmed to the Abbey of Saint Colombanus di Bobbio by Emperor Otto I, who in the same year in a donation to the monastery of San Pietro in Ciel d'Oro in Pavia mentioned Casale.

In the 14th century the country is involved in the struggles between the Guelphs, on whose side is sided by the nearby Tortona, and Ghibellines, for which it partisan.

In 1373 it was completely destroyed by the troops of Giovanni Acuto, and then rebuilt in its current position by order of Galeazzo Visconti, Duke of Milan.

In 1415, Filippo Maria Visconti assigned the village to Tortona and in 1469 it was granted as a fief for two thirds to Giovanni Spinola and one third to Gabriele Visconti.

In 1523 Charles V granted it as a fief to the Spinola counts of Los Balbases, aggregating it to the county of Tortona and then to the Duchy of Milan.

In 1707, following the accusation of partisanship against Philip V, were seized all assets to Spinola, including Casalnoceto, which will return in possession from 1725 to 1797, the year of suppression of the feuds.

In December 1798 it was constituted as a republican municipality.

In 1814 the Savoy placed it under the mandate of Volpedo.

== Main sights ==
The church of San Rocco is housed in a 14th-century tower, a remnant of the ancient city walls. Inside, it is worth mentioning the vault frescoed by the Genoese artist Lazzaro Tavarone.

Opposite the church of San Rocco is one of the most remarkable buildings in the town, now part of the Vaccari estate and used as a venue for events: the manor wing of this building (commissioned by Paolo Spinola in 1687, designed by the architect Giuseppe Quadrio and adapted as a summer residence by the Vaccari family and its descendants) was home to cloistered nuns belonging to the Carmelite order for about a century. It is part of the lower Piedmont "Open Castles" system (a cultural initiative for the use of museum facilities).

Some of the rooms contain period religious frescoes by the aforementioned Tavarone and furnishings, testifying to a way of life that is renewed on a daily basis with the presence of guests.

In the place named Rosano, the church of S. Maria, dating back to the 13th century, is all that remains of an ancient Franciscan convent. Renovated in the 17th century, its crypt contains the tombs of twelve members of the Spinola family, including Ambrogio Spinola, governor of Milan at the time of the events narrated in The Betrothed.
