= Casasco =

- Comune
- Comune di Casasco
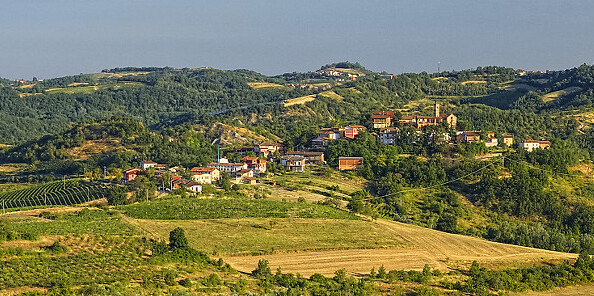

- Location within Italy Location within Piedmont
- Coordinates: 44°50′N 9°0′E
- Country: Italy
- Region: Piedmont
- Province: Alessandria (AL)

Government
  - Mayor: Enrico Mandirola

Area
  - Total: 9.04 km^{2} (3.49 sq mi)
- Elevation: 398 m (1,306 ft)

Population (31 May 2021)
  - Total: 115
  - Density: 12.7/km^{2} (32.9/sq mi)
- Demonym: Casaschesi
- Time zone: UTC+1 (CET)
  - Summer (DST): UTC+2 (CEST)
- Postal code: 15050
- Dialing code: 0131
- Website: Official website

Casasco is a comune (municipality) in the Province of Alessandria in the Italian region Piedmont, located about 110 kilometres (68 mi) east of Turin and about 30 kilometres (19 mi) southeast of Alessandria.

Casasco borders the following municipalities: Avolasca, Brignano-Frascata, Garbagna, Momperone, and Montemarzino.
