= Garbagna, Piedmont =

Garbagna
- Comune
- Comune di Garbagna
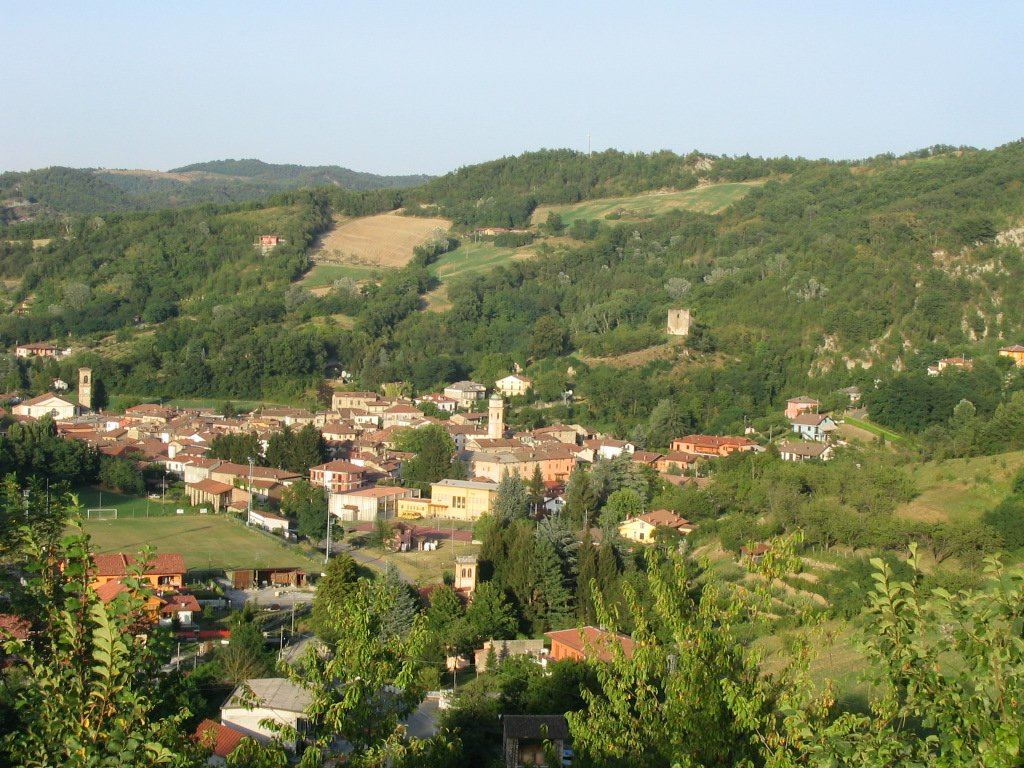

- Location within Italy Location within Piedmont
- Coordinates: 44°47′N 9°0′E
- Country: Italy
- Region: Piedmont
- Province: Alessandria (AL)

Government
  - Mayor: Fabio Semino

Area
  - Total: 20.7 km^{2} (8.0 sq mi)
- Elevation: 293 m (961 ft)

Population (31 October 2020)
  - Total: 613
  - Density: 29.6/km^{2} (76.7/sq mi)
- Demonym: Garbagnoli
- Time zone: UTC+1 (CET)
  - Summer (DST): UTC+2 (CEST)
- Postal code: 15050
- Dialing code: 0131

Garbagna is a comune (municipality) in the Province of Alessandria in the Italian region Piedmont, located about 110 kilometres (68 mi) southeast of Turin and about 35 kilometres (22 mi) southeast of Alessandria.

Garbagna borders the following municipalities: Avolasca, Borghetto di Borbera, Brignano-Frascata, Casasco, Castellania Coppi, Dernice, and Sardigliano. It is one of I Borghi più belli d'Italia ("The most beautiful villages of Italy").
