= Volpedo =

- Comune
- Comune di Volpedo
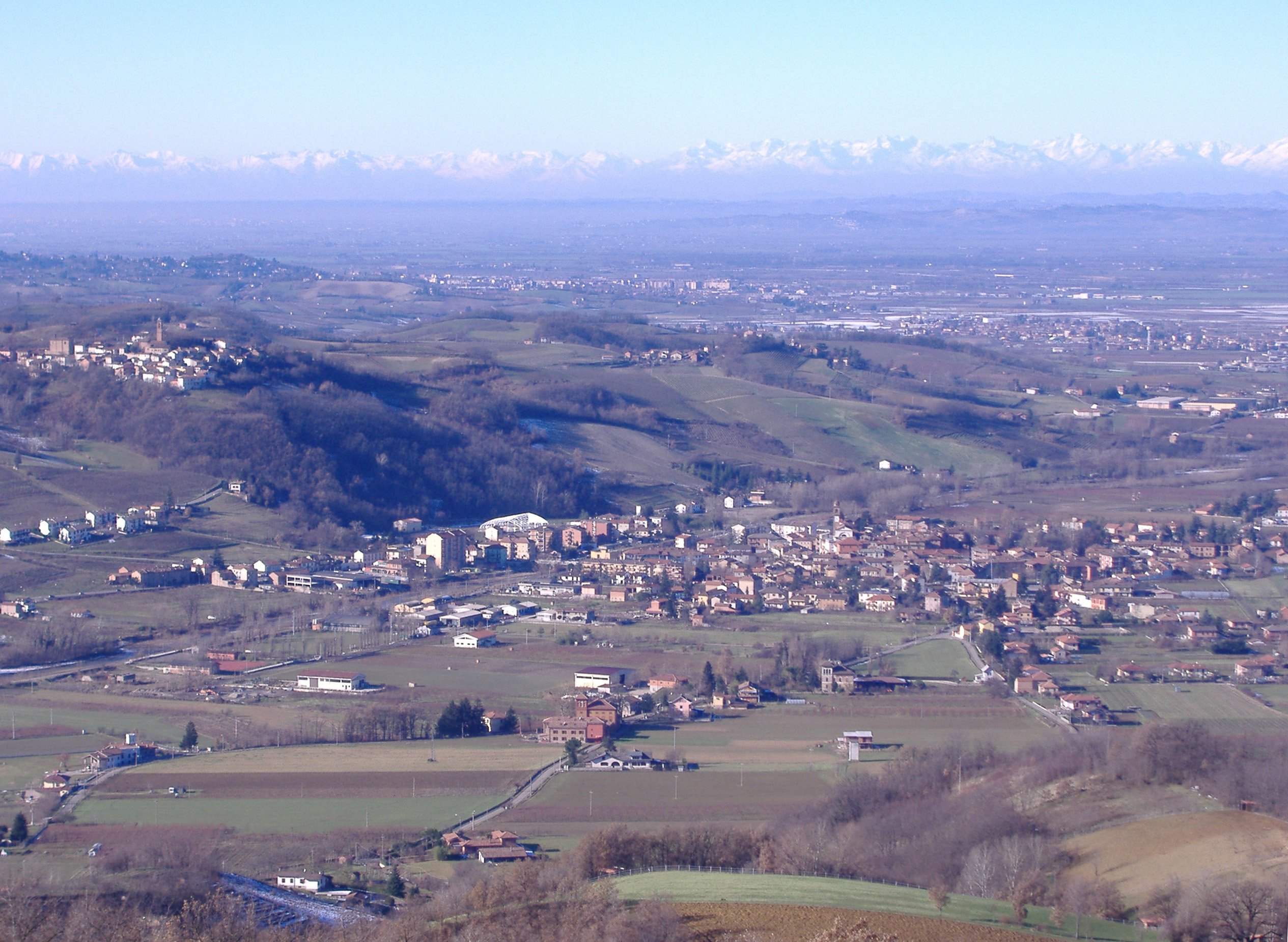

- Coat of arms

- Location within Italy Location within Piedmont
- Coordinates: 44°53′N 8°59′E
- Country: Italy
- Region: Piedmont
- Province: Alessandria (AL)
- Frazioni: Ca' Barbieri, Casanova, Cascinetta, Cà Stringa, Croce, Ghilina

Government
  - Mayor: Elisa Giardini

Area
  - Total: 10.6 km^{2} (4.1 sq mi)
- Elevation: 182 m (597 ft)

Population (31 October 2020)
  - Total: 1,168
  - Density: 110/km^{2} (285/sq mi)
- Demonym: Volpedesi
- Time zone: UTC+1 (CET)
  - Summer (DST): UTC+2 (CEST)
- Postal code: 15059
- Dialing code: 0131
- ISTAT code: 006188
- Patron saint: St. John the Apostle
- Saint day: 27 December
- Website: Official website

Volpedo is a comune (municipality) in the province of Alessandria, in the Italian region of Piedmont, located about 100 kilometres (62 mi) east of Turin and about 30 kilometres (19 mi) east of Alessandria.

Volpedo borders the following municipalities: Casalnoceto, Godiasco, Monleale, Montemarzino, Pozzol Groppo, and Volpeglino. It is one of I Borghi più belli d'Italia ("The most beautiful villages of Italy").

Painter Giuseppe Pellizza da Volpedo was born in this village.

== History ==
A burial slab, now enclosed in the parish church's walls, shows the Roman presence in the area in the 1st century BC, although the area was perhaps already inhabited by the Ligures.

In the 10th century it is documented as Vicus Piculus (from latin vicus: "Small village") and received a Romanesque pieve and a castrum, a fortified village whose walls, rebuilt in the 16th century, are still visible today. In the 12th century it was known as Vicus pecudis, and was connected to the comune of Tortona, sending relief troops to that city during the siege laid by Frederick Barbarossa in 1155.

In 1347 Tortona was annexed by the Visconti of Milan who, in 1412, gave Volpedo as a fief to the condottiero Pierino Cameri. The latter ceded the town to the Cathedral of Milan. In 1513 the walls of Volpedo, of Guelph allegiance, were destroyed by the historical Ghibelline rival town of Monleale on the opposite side of the river Curone; the walls were rebuilt in 1589, when Milan was under Spanish domination.

In 1738 Volpedo, together with all the area of Tortona, was acquired by the Kingdom of Sardinia (Piedmont), and was given as a fief to marquis Filippo Guidobono Cavalchini. In 1849 it became a possession of the Malaspina.

In the 19th century part of the walls were progressively dismantled, and in 1856 the Curone bridge, linking Volpedo with Monleale, was built. Only in 1885 a direct route to Tortona, passing through Monleale, was built.

Between 1928 and 1947, the communes of Berzano, Monleale and Volpeglino were merged into that of Volpedo.

== Main sights ==
- Romanesque pieve (pleban church), known since the 10th century and restored in the late 15th century. It houses frescoes from the 15th century from the brothers Manfredino and Franceschino Basilio, also active in the Milan's Duomo.
- 16th century bastions which once enclosed the medieval castrum, and now mark the historical center of Volpedo.
- House-studio of the painter Pellizza da Volpedo
