= Arturo Sacchetti =

Italian musicologist

Arturo Sacchetti (Santhià, near Vercelli, 9 January 1941) is an Italian organist, conductor and musicologist. He worked as artistic director at the Radio Vatican.

He studied at the Conservatorio di Milano. He has given over 2,300 concerts, as choral conductor, orchestral conductor, organist, harpsichordist, and pianist. He has performed in public the complete works of J. S. Bach, Buxtehude, Mozart, Telemann, and others. He has made 150 recordings, on LP as well as CD.

For many years, Sacchetti has dedicated himself to the music of Lorenzo Perosi, whose complete works he is performing, recording, and editing.

== Appointments ==
- Direzione del Coro da camera della RAI
- Insegnamento presso il Conservatorio S. Cecilia di Roma
- Direzione artistica della Radio Vaticana
- Direzione del Liceo Musicale G.B. Viotti di Vercelli
- Direzione della Società cameristica di Lugano
- Direttore artistico dell' Accademia Internazionale di Musica "G. Carisio" del "Civico Istituto di Musica" di Asti
- Direttore artistico dell' "Ente perosiano" di Tortona
- Direttore artistico della "Associazione artistica C. L. Centemeri" di Monza
- Direttore del "Centro studi C. Della Giacoma" di Todi
- Docente d'organo della "Regia Accademia Filarmonica" di Bologna
- Docente dell' "Accademia L. Perosi" di Tortona
- Ispettore onorario del Ministero dei Beni Artistici e Storici.
- Accademico per chiara fama dalla "Regia Accademia Filarmonica" di Bologna.

== See also ==
- Don Lorenzo Perosi
