= Agostino delle Prospettive =

Italian 16th century painter

Agostino Delle Prospettive painted at Bologna about 1525. He was very skilful in aerial and lineal perspective, and imitated steps, doors, and windows, so perfectly as to deceive men and brute animals. He painted a piece at the Carmine, which for its foreshortening Lomazzo instances, along with the cupola of Correggio at Parma, as a model of excellence.
