= San Barnaba, Milan =

Church in Milan, Italy

Church of San Barnaba (Chiesa di San Barnaba)
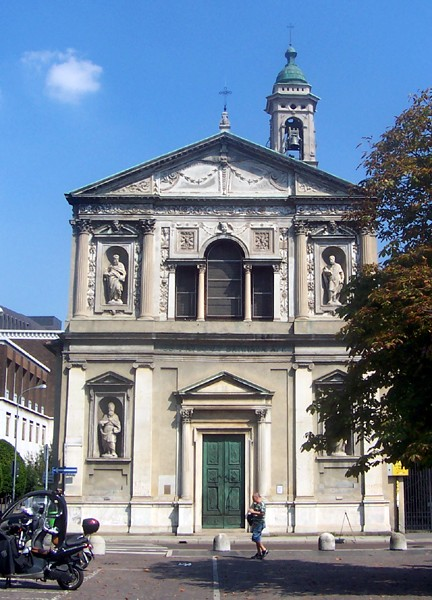
- Façade of the church.

Religion
- Affiliation: Roman Catholic
- Province: Milan
- Rite: Latin Rite
- Patron: Saint Barnabas
- Status: Active

Location
- Location: Milan, Italy
- Interactive map of Church of San Barnaba (Chiesa di San Barnaba)
- Coordinates: 45°27′36″N 9°12′07″E

Architecture
- Type: Church
- Style: Mannerist
- Groundbreaking: 1558
- Completed: 17th century

Specifications
- Direction of façade: East
- Spire: 1

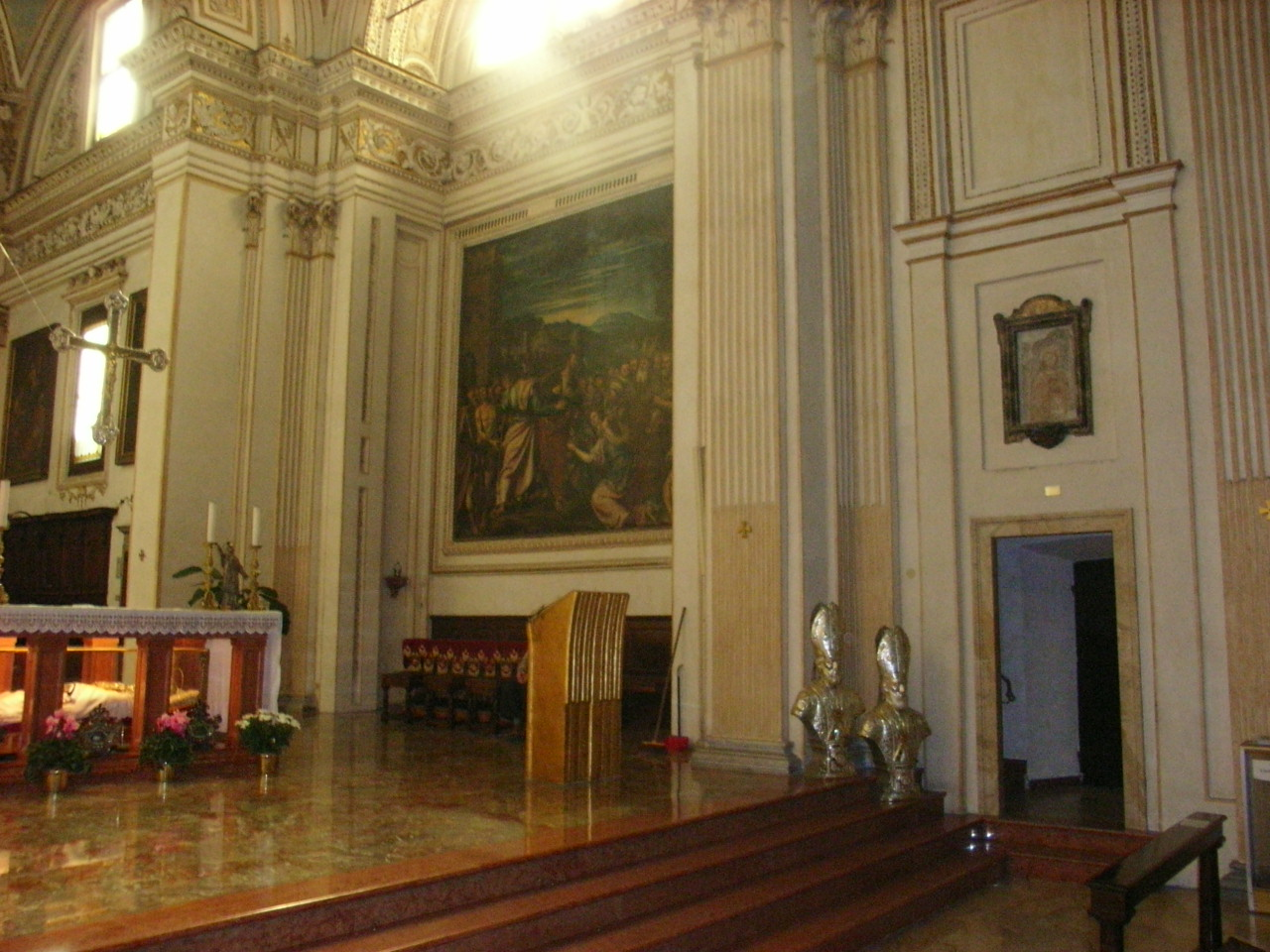
View of the presbytery with one of Peterzano's canvasses

San Barnaba is a church in Milan, Italy. It is the first edifice of the Barnabites order.

== History ==
The congregation founded in 1530 by Anthony Mary Zaccaria was given the name "Clerics Regular of St. Paul". It was approved by Pope Clement VII in the brief Vota per quae vos in 1533. In 1538 the old monastery of "Preposturale of San Barnaba in Brova" by the Milan city wall was given to the congregation as their main seat, and thenceforth they were known the popular name of Barnabites.

== Architecture ==
Renovations began on the old monastery in 1545, but it soon became clear that the building was too small. Designed by Galeazzo Alessi was commissioned to design its renovation and expansion. It has a nave with barrel vault, finishing in a rectangular presbytery serving as the sanctuary. Construction was completed in 1567, followed by embellishing the interior, which continued into 1568. The first mass was celebrated in 1568 by Archbishop of Milan Charles Borromeo, Cardinal Protector of the Barnabite order, who had himself donated the altar.

There is an altar dedicated to Alexander Sauli, a Superior-General of the Barnabite order (1566–1569) and "Apostle of Corsica".

The interior includes a notable selection of Milanese Mannerist artworks: the Stigmata of St. Francis by Giovan Paolo Lomazzo, a Pietà by Aurelio Luini and, flaking the high altar two large canvasses of Histories of St. Paul and Barnaba, Simone Peterzano's (1572–1573).
