= Perosi =

Perosi is an Italian surname. Notable people with the surname include:

- Carlo Perosi (1868–1930), Italian cardinal
- Lorenzo Perosi (1872–1956), Italian classical composer
- Marziano Perosi (1875–1959), Italian classical organist, choirmaster and composer
