= Palace Priuli Ballan =

Building in Piove di Sacco, Italy

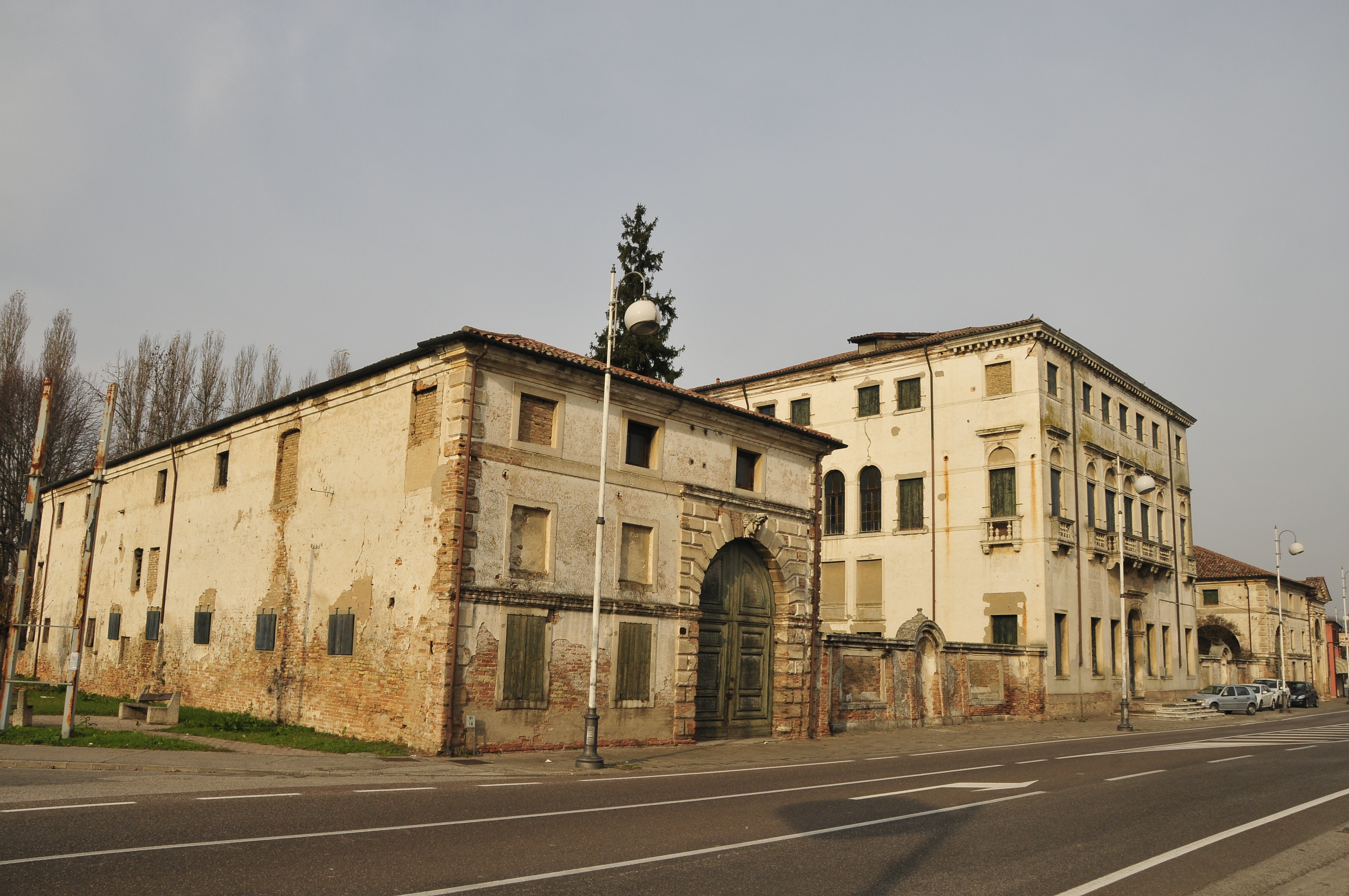

General information
- Location: Piove di Sacco (Pd) Italy, Street Borgo Rossi 20 - Italy, Piove di Sacco (Pd) Italy
- Coordinates: 45.28897°N 12.03084°E
- Construction started: 16th century
- Completed: 18th century
- Owner: Family Ballan

Palace Priuli Ballan is a stately building example of Venetian villa situated in Piove di Sacco (PD), located at number 20 of Via Borgo Rossi. (Italy)

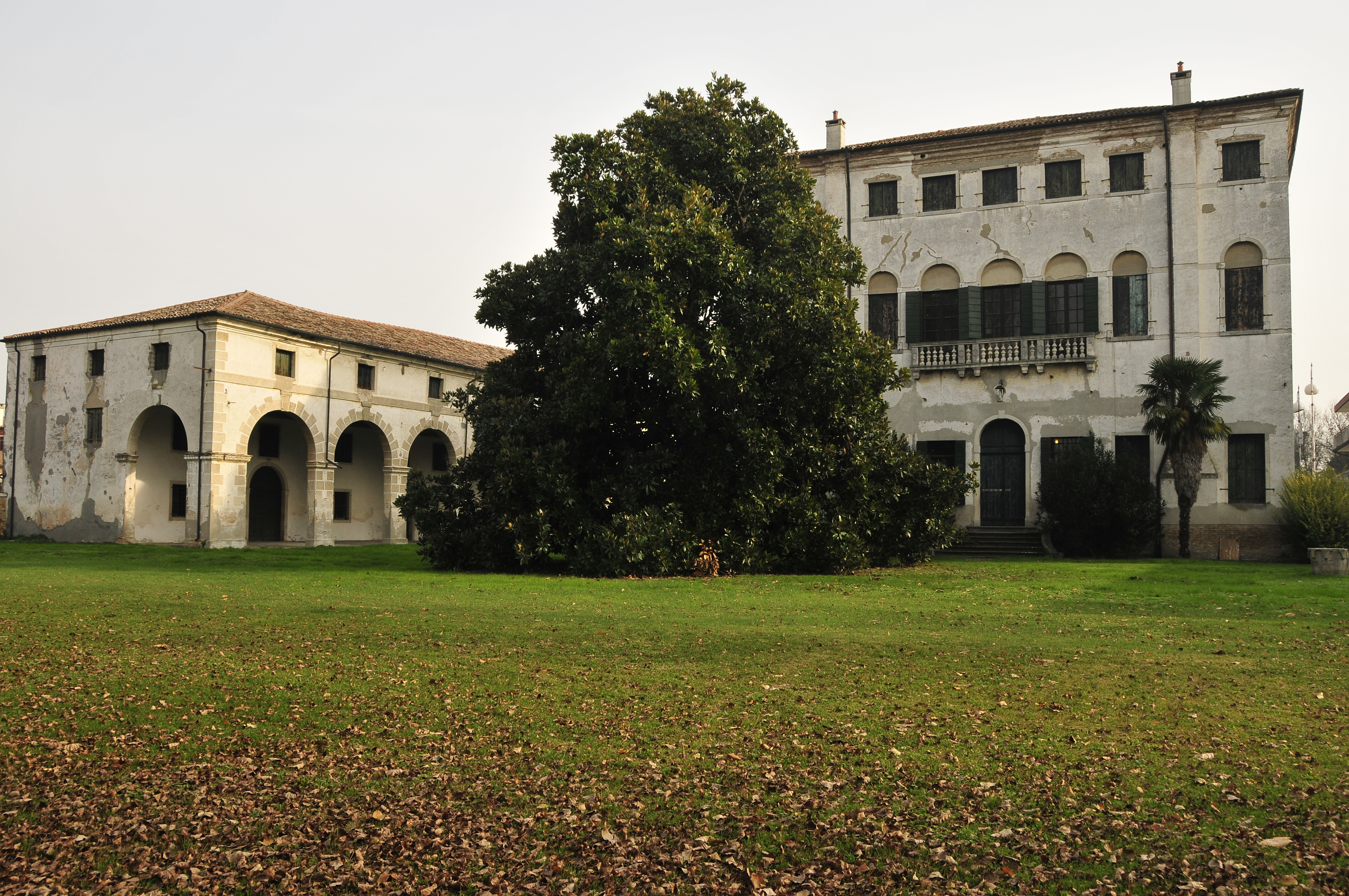
Palace Priuli Ballan seen from the garden

== History ==
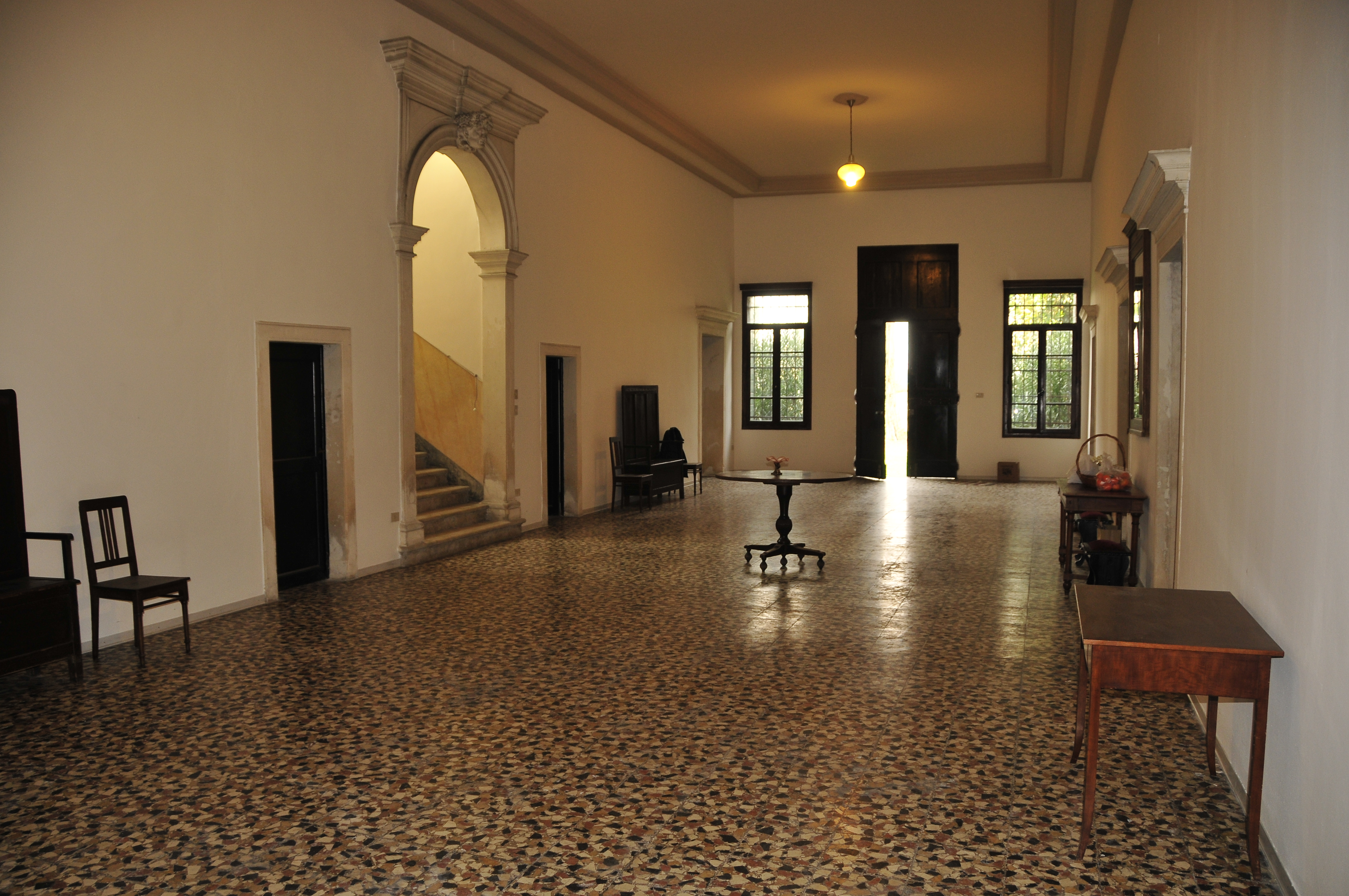
Palace Priuli Ballan ground floor lounge

The palace is situated just outside the historical center of Piove di Sacco, outside of boundary channel, in the district that now is called Borgo Rossi once Contrà Santa Giustina and along the road leading to the village Arzerello. The first mention of the complex is reported in a "declaration of the cadastral value" that dates back to 1518 and in which it is cited Alvise Priuli was Nicholas who owns a two-storey building in addition to the ground floor.

The "barchesse" (wings) and the oratory, dates back to a later period, they are mentioned in a document of the mid-1700s by Andrea Gloria who speaks of "the opulent Priuli with large adjacent factories, garden and shady avenues."

== Recent history ==
Like many villas and historic buildings, the palace was used during the third war of independence from the Austrian army and as a military hospital during the First World War. In 1940 it was seriously damaged by a fire which it made it unsafe. The restoration was carried out in collaboration with the Superintendency for Cultural Property, by the Bastianello Family of Padua at the time owner of the building, who lived in it for a short period. Later during the Second World War, has provided accommodation to some displaced people, was used as a command of the German troops and even as a warehouse. They remain as testimony, writings and pencil drawings visible on some walls of the oratory. Since the end of the war until 1957, it was used as offices and tobacco warehouse. It is currently owned by the family Ballan of Piove di Sacco and is occasionally used for meetings at cultural or convivial character.

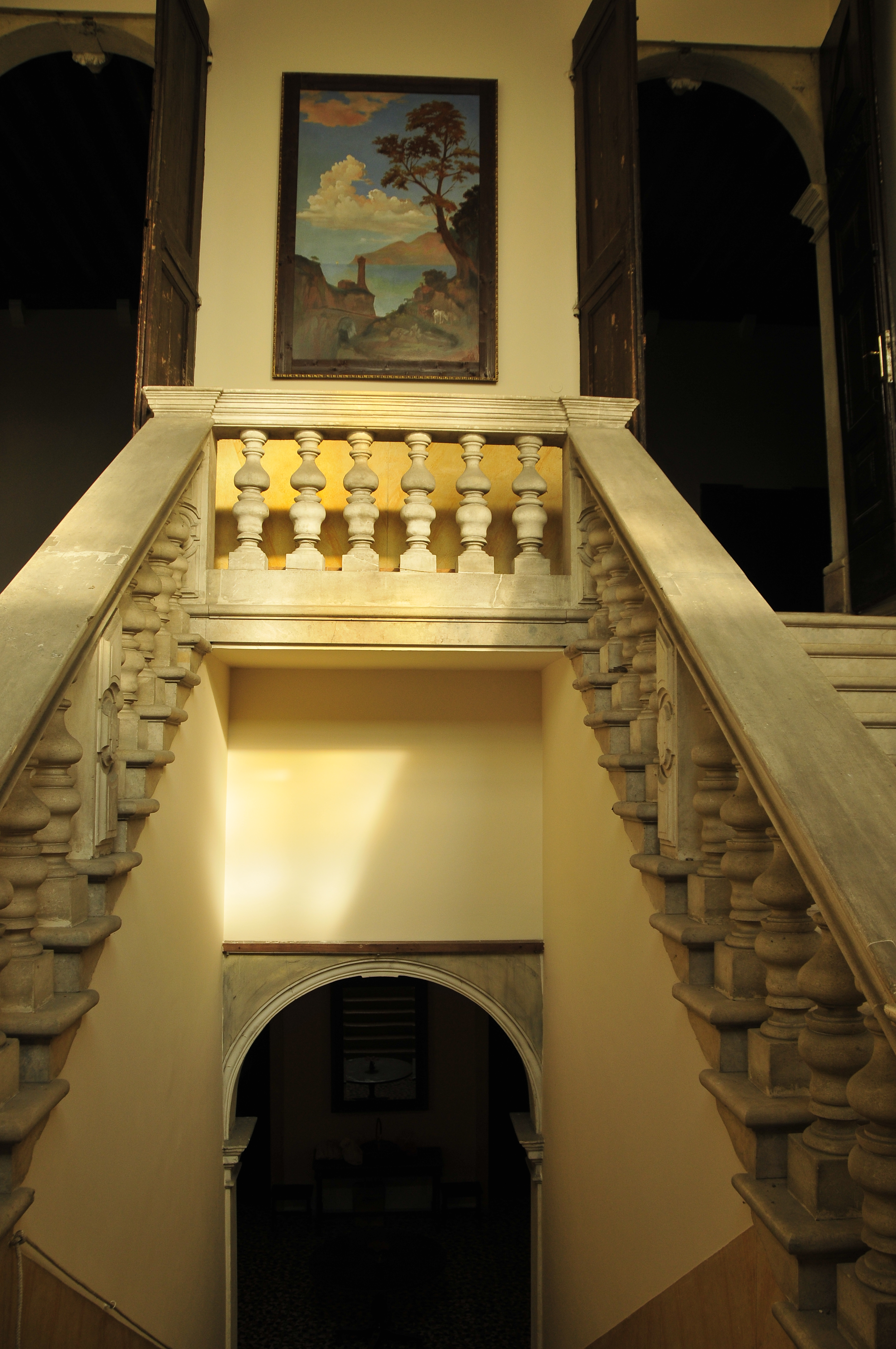
Palace Priuli Ballan wide stairs

== Building description ==
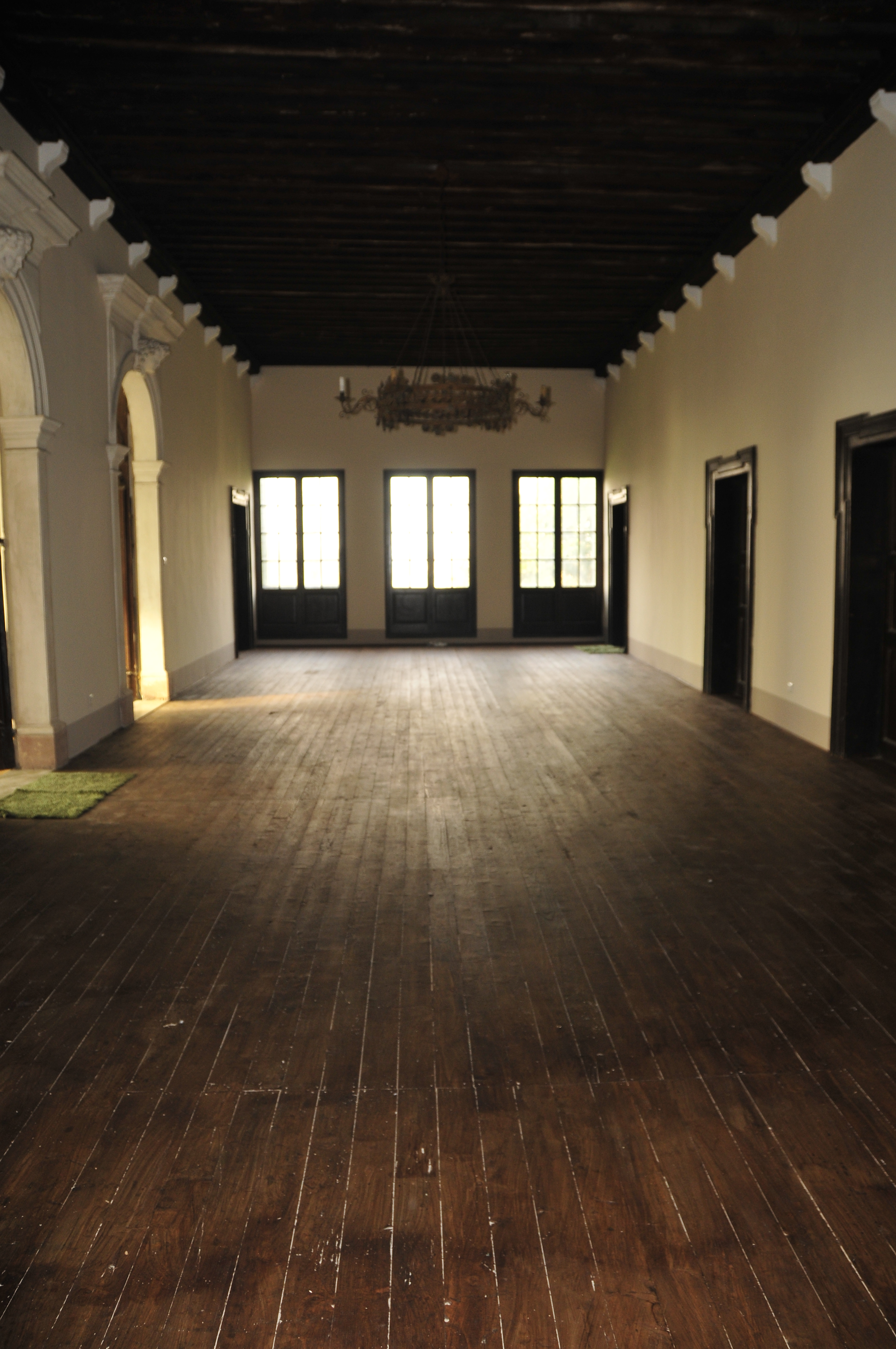
Palace Priuli Ballan first floor lounge

The complex consists of a central body, two lateral "barchesse" (wings), a chapel, a park and from the remains of a hemicycle situated at the front. The main building has a rectangular plan and is on three floors. The structure is typical of the Venetian Villas. Is made up of a through-hall onto which overlook symmetrically the doors of the side rooms, by a monumental staircase with pincer form leading to the main floor which has a similar shape. A service staircase leads to the second floor that was probably inhabited by the servitude and used occasionally from the property in the cooler months. Front of the building along the highway, lies what remains of an exedra which once was an integral part of the complex and of which now remains only a niche where there is a statue which is said to represent Hercules. Now this annexe is not owned, has lost most of the ornaments of which was composed and is detached from the park which is located in the back of the villa and that instead still keeps six well-preserved statues positioned over the original foundations. These statues, paired two by two, constituted the entrance of the three avenues penetrating into the Italian park that now no longer present.

== Barchesse (wings) ==
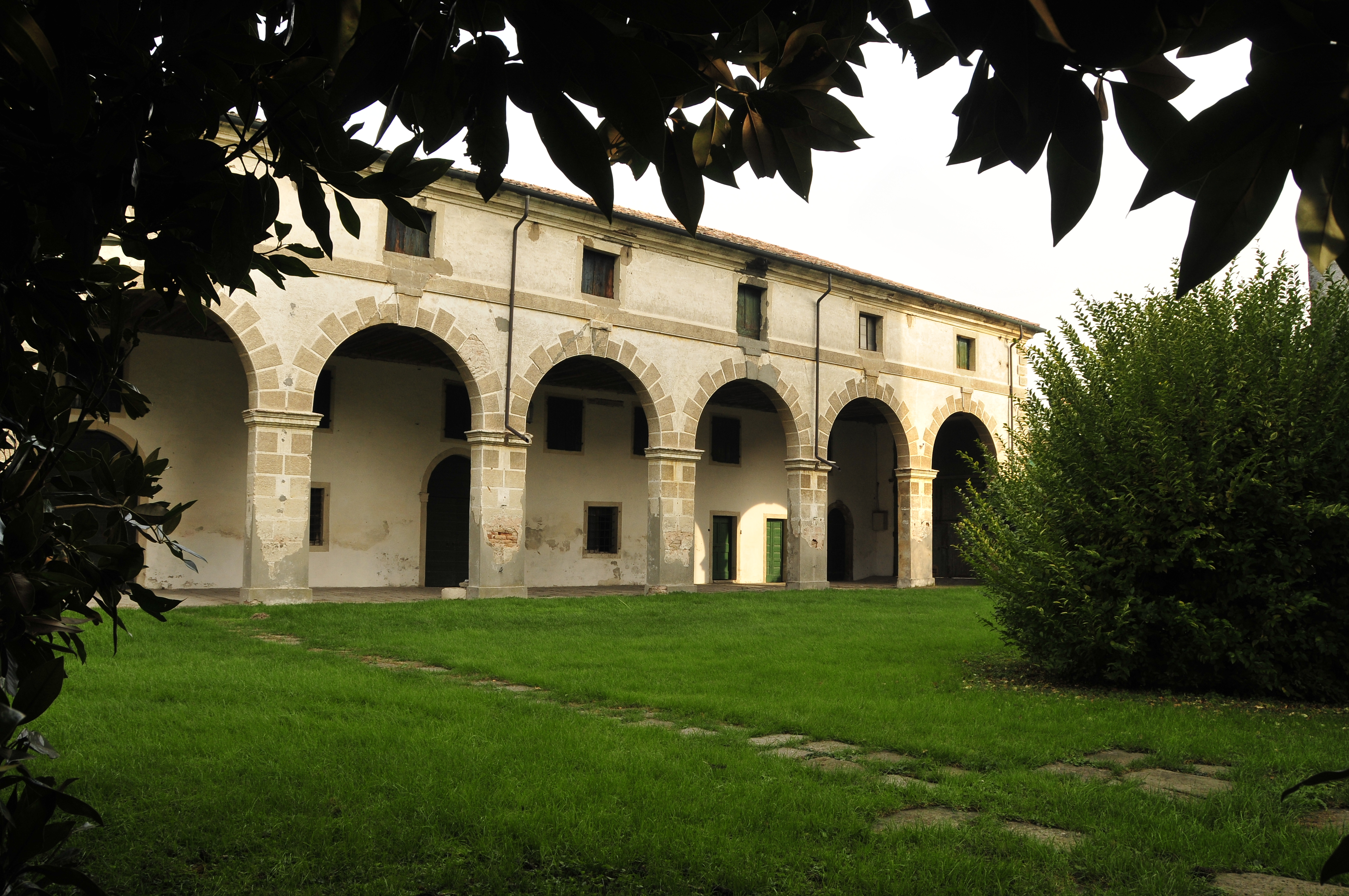
Palace Priuli Ballan barchesse (wings)

The two lateral "barchesse" are like two large open wings detached from the main structure. These adjacencies are on three floors. The facades that protrude toward the villa are marked by seven arches covered with ashlar while the arches that face the highway are enriched in the keystone with masks and seals.

== The oratory ==
Built on the north wing of the palace, and with an entrance that looks out on the highway, it is the oratory consecrated in 1713 and dedicated to St. Andrew the Apostle and Holy Elizabeth and Elena. It presents both outside and inside shapes almost perfectly intact. Inside it still preserves the demarcation which previously limited the space reserved for the hosts from the servitude. The main element is the baroque altar inlaid with colored marble that finds its twin in a similar side altar situated in the Cathedral dedicated to the Virgin Mary and that is located on the island of Krk in Croatia.
