= Raffaele Rossi =

Italian cardinal

Servant of God Raffaele Rossi OCD
- Secretary of the Sacred Consistorial Congregation
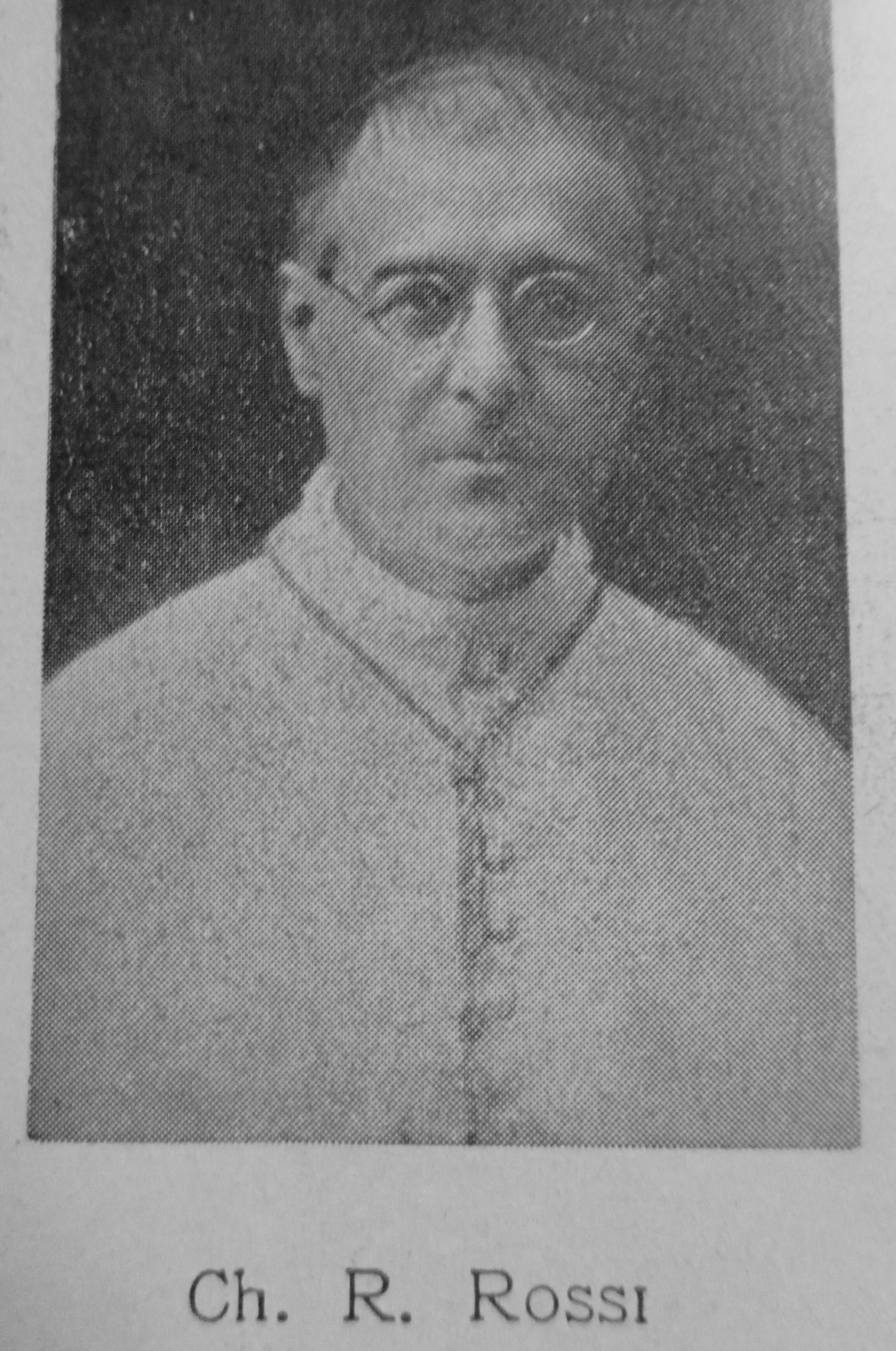
- Church: Roman Catholic Church
- Appointed: 4 July 1930
- Term ended: 17 September 1948
- Predecessor: Carlo Perosi
- Successor: Adeodato Giovanni Piazza
- Other posts: Cardinal-Priest of Santa Prassede (1930-48); Superior General of Congregation of the Missionaries of Saint Charles Borromeo (1930-48)
- Previous posts: Bishop of Volterra (1920-23); Assessor of the Sacred Consistorial Congregation (1923-30); Secretary of Sacred College of Cardinals (1923-30); Titular Archbishop of Thessalonica (1923-30)

Orders
- Ordination: 21 December 1901 by Ferdinando dei Conti Capponi
- Consecration: 25 May 1920 by Gaetano de Lai
- Created cardinal: 30 June 1930 by Pope Pius XI
- Rank: Cardinal-Priest

Personal details
- Born: Carlo Rossi; 28 October 1876 Pisa, Kingdom of Italy
- Died: 17 September 1948 (aged 71) Crespano del Grappa, Treviso, Italy
- Motto: Justitia in Carmelo ("Justice in Carmel")

Sainthood
- Venerated in: Roman Catholic Church
- Title as Saint: Servant of God
- Attributes: Cardinal's attire; Carmelite habit

Styles of Raffaele Rossi
- Reference style: His Eminence
- Spoken style: Your Eminence
- Religious style: Cardinal
- Posthumous style: Servant of God
- Informal style: Cardinal
- See: None

Ordination history of Raffaele Rossi
History
Priestly ordination
- Ordained by: Ferdinando dei Conti Capponi
Episcopal consecration
- Principal consecrator: Gaetano de Lai
- Co-consecrators: Rinaldo Camillo Rousset & Pio Marcello Bagnoli
Cardinalate
- Elevated by: Pope Pius XI
Episcopal succession
Bishops consecrated by Raffaele Rossi as principal consecrator
- Giuseppe Marcozi: 8 December 1926
- Giuseppe Rossino: 19 April 1931
- Francesco de Filippis: 26 July 1931
- Amleto Giovanni Cicognani: 23 April 1933
- Antonio Giordani: 30 July 1933
- Moses Elias Kiley: 17 March 1934
- Carlo de Ferrari, C.S.S.: 12 January 1936
- Teodosio Clemente de Gouveia: 5 July 1936
- Michal Buzalka: 15 May 1938
- William Godfrey: 21 December 1938
- Guido Luigi Bentivoglio, O. Cist.: 24 August 1939
- Giuseppe Di Donna, O.SS.T.: 31 March 1940
- Marco Giovanni Della Pietra, O.F.M.: 12 May 1940
- Francesco Pieri: 26 January 1941
- Carlo Baldini, O.M.D.: 12 October 1941
- Emilio Baroncelli: 14 February 1943
- Antonio Lanza: 29 June 1943
- Carlo Alberto Ferrero di Cavallerleone: 30 November 1944
- Gilla Vincenzo Gremigni, M.S.C.: 11 February 1945
- Giuseppe D'Avack: 10 March 1946
- Martin-Marie-Stanislas Gillet, O.P.: 17 November 1946
- Gabriel Paulino Bueno Couto, O. Carm.: 15 December 1946
- John Anthony Kyne: 29 June 1947

Raffaele Rossi, OCD, born Carlo Rossi, (28 October 1876 – 17 September 1948), was an Italian Discalced Carmelite and cardinal. Rossi served in the Sacred Consistorial Congregation in the Roman Curia from 1930 until his death and as a friar had the religious name Raffaele of Saint Joseph. Pope Pius XI elevated Rossi into the cardinalate in 1930. His cause of beatification began three decades after his death and he is known as a Servant of God.

Rossi served as an investigator into the stigmata of Pio of Pietrelcina at the behest of Pope Benedict XV and reported back to him with a favourable view on the Capuchin. He viewed the stigmata and spoke with the friar while noting that he was "sincere" and concluding that there was no fraud or deceit on the friar's part.

== Life ==
=== Education and priesthood ===
Carlo Rossi was born in Pisa in 1876 to Francesco Rossi and Maria Palmidessi. His parents were descended from noble families.

Rossi felt called in 1891 to enter the religious life despite the opposition of his father who instead enrolled Rossi for a philosophical course at the college in Pisa where one of his mentors was Giuseppe Toniolo. Rossi entered the Discalced Carmelites on 3 October 1887 and later made his first vows on 19 December 1899. His solemn vows were made on 20 September 1901. Rossi was ordained to the priesthood on 21 December 1901 in Pisa, after he completed his ecclesial studies at the Carmelite International College and at the Carmelite Scholasticate in Rome. He then taught at Carmelite houses from 1902 until 1920, after having studied at the Pontifical Gregorian for further studies. One of his lecturers at the Gregorian was Cardinal Louis Billot and he made friends with Father Eugenio Pacelli, the future pope. Rossi also served at some stage at the order's house of San Paolino in Florence.

=== Consecration ===
On 22 April 1920, Rossi was appointed as the Bishop of Volterra and he received his episcopal consecration a month later, from Cardinal Gaetano de Lai with Archbishop Rinaldo Rousset and Bishop Pio Bagnoli serving as the co-consecrators. It was celebrated in the church of Santa Teresa al Corso d'Italia. He selected Charles Borromeo as his model for his episcopate.

=== Padre Pio investigation ===
In 1921, he received a letter from Rome that commissioned him to conduct an investigation into the Capuchin friar Pio of Pietrelcina and his stigmata. Rossi did not wish this task and sent a letter to Cardinal Merry del Val asking to be relieved from such a serious investigation but was required to accept the position in response. Rossi travelled to Rome from his diocese to examine the documents on the friar while assessing the accusations and praise before leaving for the Capuchin convent at San Giovanni Rotondo that June, with a degree of initial scepticism. Rossi met with Padre Pio to discuss the allegations and reported that the friar seemed "simple and even nice" while being allowed to view the stigmata for himself. He observed Pio's routine and noted his activities while later speaking with the other friars to learn that Pio converted people from Judaism and Protestantism and converted hardened hearts from all across Europe. Rossi's investigation was positive and concluded that Pio was a "practiced practitioner of virtue" and noted that the friar did not practice deceit or fraud while noting that Pio did not inflict the wounds upon himself nor did an external source cause it. Rossi noted that "there are stigmata. We have before us a fact" and included that in his report to the pope while also stating that "Padre Pio was a saint who performed miracles" according to the people who came across him.

=== Episcopate and cardinalate ===
The pope named him as an Assistant at the Pontifical Throne on 11 March 1930. Before being promoted as the Titular Archbishop of Thessalonica on 20 December 1923 he was named as an assessor of the Sacred Consistorial Congregation. Pope Pius XI created him as the Cardinal-Priest of Santa Prassede on 30 June 1930 in advance of Rossi's appointment as the head of the Sacred Consistorial Congregation a month after. He received his red hat and title in the week following his elevation. In his position Rossi was the head of that congregation as the pope held the title of a prefect in its traditional sense. He was also one of the Cardinal electors in Papal conclave, 1939 that elected Pope Pius XII. Rossi attempted to eschew much of the trappings of the cardinalate and attempted also to keep the ascetic life of a Discalced Carmelites and was held in high esteem by both his colleagues and the pope himself. Rossi later became the Superior General for the Scalabrini Fathers and became quite close to them in his work with them.

=== Death ===
Rossi's health began to decline at the start of 1947 and the papal doctor advised total rest. He died in Crespano del Grappa during the night on 17 September 1948 and was buried at the Santa Teresa al Corso d'Italia church. He was discovered dead in his bed (a slight smile on his face) with three books at his side: one was the Bible and another was The Imitation of Christ. He had moved to Crespano del Grappa the month prior due to failing health and resided with the Scalabrini Fathers. Pope Pius XII said that Rossi's contribution to the Church was great and would be recognized in the future. The pope also referred to Rossi as "almost their second father" in relation to the Scalabrini Fathers due to his great closeness and extensive work with them.

== Beatification process ==
His beatication process commenced on 23 April 1976 under Pope Paul VI and Rossi was titled as a Servant of God. The diocesan process for the investigation was held in Rome and closed in 1979 before the Congregation for the Causes of Saints confirmed on 29 March 1985 that the process was valid. The positio was submitted to the congregation in 1989 for further evaluation and underwent theological approval on 23 February 1996. One miracle attributed to him was investigated in the Diocese of Lucca from 1983 to 1984 and the process received validation on 6 May 1988.

Catholic Church titles
Preceded by Emanuele Mignone	Bishop of Volterra; 22 April 1920 – 1 June 1923	Succeeded by Dante Munerati
Preceded by Achille Locatelli	Titular Archbishop of Thessalonica; 20 December 1923 – 30 June 1930	Succeeded by Giuseppe Rossino
Preceded by Rafael Merry del Val	Cardinal-Priest of Santa Prassede; 3 July 1930 – 17 September 1948	Succeeded by Pietro Ciriaci
Preceded by Carlo Perosi	Secretary of the Sacred Consistorial Congregation; 4 July 1930 – 17 September 1948	Succeeded by Adeodato Giovanni Piazza
