= Giovane scuola =

Group of Italian composers.

The giovane scuola ("young school") refers to a group of Italian composers (mostly operatic) who succeeded Verdi and flourished in the late 19th and early 20th century. The group all had close connections with the Milan Conservatory and included Puccini, Mascagni, Leoncavallo, Giordano, Cilea, Pietro Floridia, Catalani and Franchetti, as well as non-operatic composers such as Lorenzo Perosi, who wrote almost exclusively sacred music. Most of the operatic composers of the giovane scuola were also members of the verismo movement. Although they also wrote more mainstream operas, many of their works focused on "the rawness of life" and the effect of poverty on society, and were characterized by an emotional rhetoric influenced by Wagner and Massenet.
