= Marziano Perosi =

Italian composer

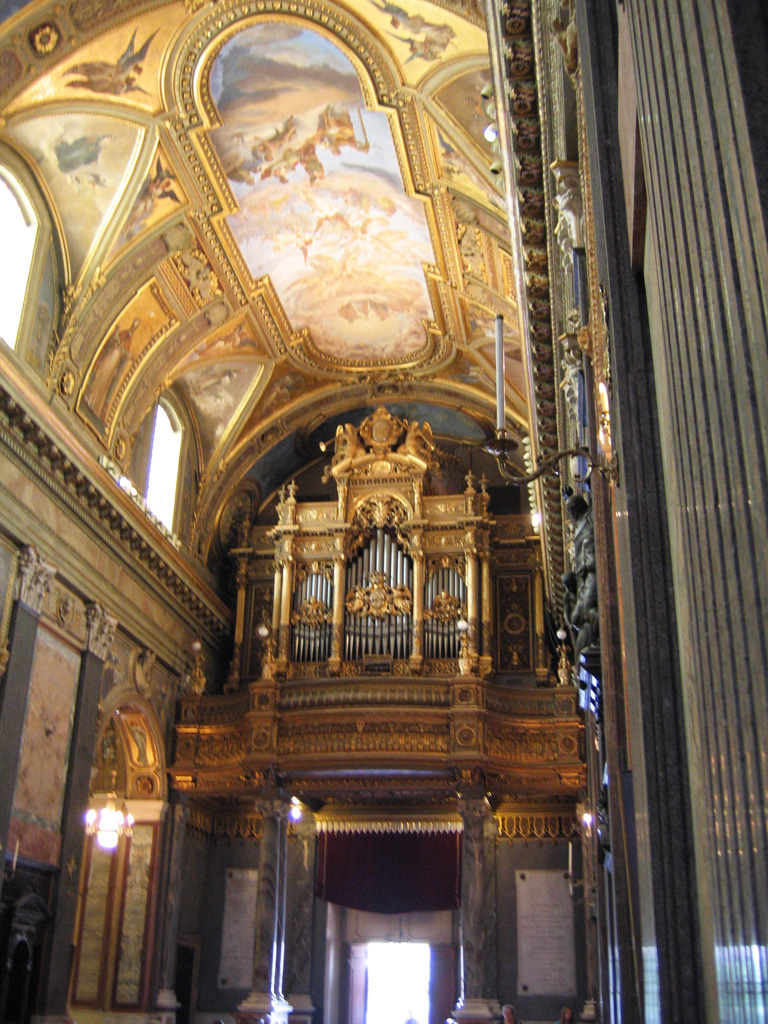
Santuario in Pompei, where Marziano Perosi was organist and choir director.

Marziano Perosi (October 20, 1875 in Tortona – February 21, 1959 in Rome) was an Italian composer, choirmaster, and organist. He was the brother of Don Lorenzo Perosi and of Cardinal Carlo Perosi. He was an organist and choirmaster at the Santuario della Madonna del Rosario in Pompei, assistant to his brother Lorenzo at the Sistine Chapel, and organist and choirmaster of the Duomo of Milan. His most significant composition was the opera Pompei.
