= Siege of Tortona =

Battle in Italy in 1155

- Part of Guelphs and Ghibellines
Date	13 February – 18 April 1155 (2 months and 5 days)
Location	Tortona 44°53′39″N 8°51′56″E
Result	Imperial victory

Belligerents
Holy Roman Empire; Commune of Pavia; Margraviate of Montferrat	Commune of Tortona; Commune of Milan

Commanders and leaders
Frederick I, Holy Roman Emperor	Obizzo Malaspina

Strength
5,400–7,200+ 5,400–7,200 1,800 knights Pavian militia Montferrat's forces	300+ 100 knights 200 archers Tortonian militia Malaspina's men

Casualties and losses
Unknown	Garrison captured City burned
- Location within Italy Siege of Tortona (Mediterranean)

The siege of Tortona in 1155 was the first major military engagement resulting from Holy Roman Emperor Frederick Barbarossa's ambition to enforce Imperial hegemony in Italy.

== Background ==
Frederick began his first Italian campaign in October 1154, allegedly to attack the Norman Kingdom of Sicily in accordance with an agreement with the Pope. Upon encountering resistance and insubordination from the Northern Italian city states, his ostensible subjects, Frederick declared a preliminary Imperial ban on Milan in December 1154.

== Prelude ==
In February 1155 he advanced to capture Tortona, a key Milanese ally and an enemy of his Pavian supporters. The citadel of Tortona, situated on a mountain, held a commanding position over the Po Valley and was protected by massive walls and fortified towers.

The Imperials began by reconnoitering the town on 7 February, then proceeded to launch a failed surprise attack. The town was held by 300 Milanese soldiers, Tortona's own militia and the men of its overall commander Obizzo Malaspina.

== Siege ==
On 13 February, the siege began as the Imperials constructed siege works everywhere around Tortona to completely blockade it. Henry the Lion's men to the south of town and the Pavian militia to the east and north attacked and burned the defenseless town on 17 February. Nightfall and a storm averted the capture of the citadel as well.

Imperial slingers, archers and crossbowmen pelted the defending troops on the walls with projectiles as the siege army constructed siege engines. A rock thrown by a mangonel destroyed part of the fortifications and killed three armoured knights. The besiegers used an engine to bore a tunnel to undermine one of the towers, but the defenders dug a counter-tunnel that collapsed the effort and killed some of the miners. Frederick then contaminated the garrison's water supply with corpses and burning sulfur and pitch. Finally, the garrison capitulated on 18 April out of thirst.

== Aftermath ==
The garrison was placed under guard, the Tortonians banished from the place and the Germans and Pavians burned everything in the city, including the graves. The destruction accomplished little: the Tortonians re-entered on 1 May with Milanese help and rebuilt the city. Frederick celebrated his victory in Pavia on 24 April and was crowned King of Italy with the Iron Crown of Lombardy in St. Michael's Church. He then made his way to Rome, where he was crowned Holy Roman Emperor on 18 June.

== Bibliography ==
- Bradbury, Jim (1992). The Medieval Siege. Woodbridge, Suffolk: Boydell Press. ISBN 978-0851153575.
- Loud, Graham A. (2014). Kedar, Benjamin Z.; Phillips, Jonathan; Riley-Smith, Jonathan (eds.). Crusades: Volume 13. Farnham: Ashgate. ISBN 978-1472441676.
