= Self-Portrait in the Costume of the Abbot of the Accademia della Val di Blenio =

Painting by Giovan Paolo Lomazzo

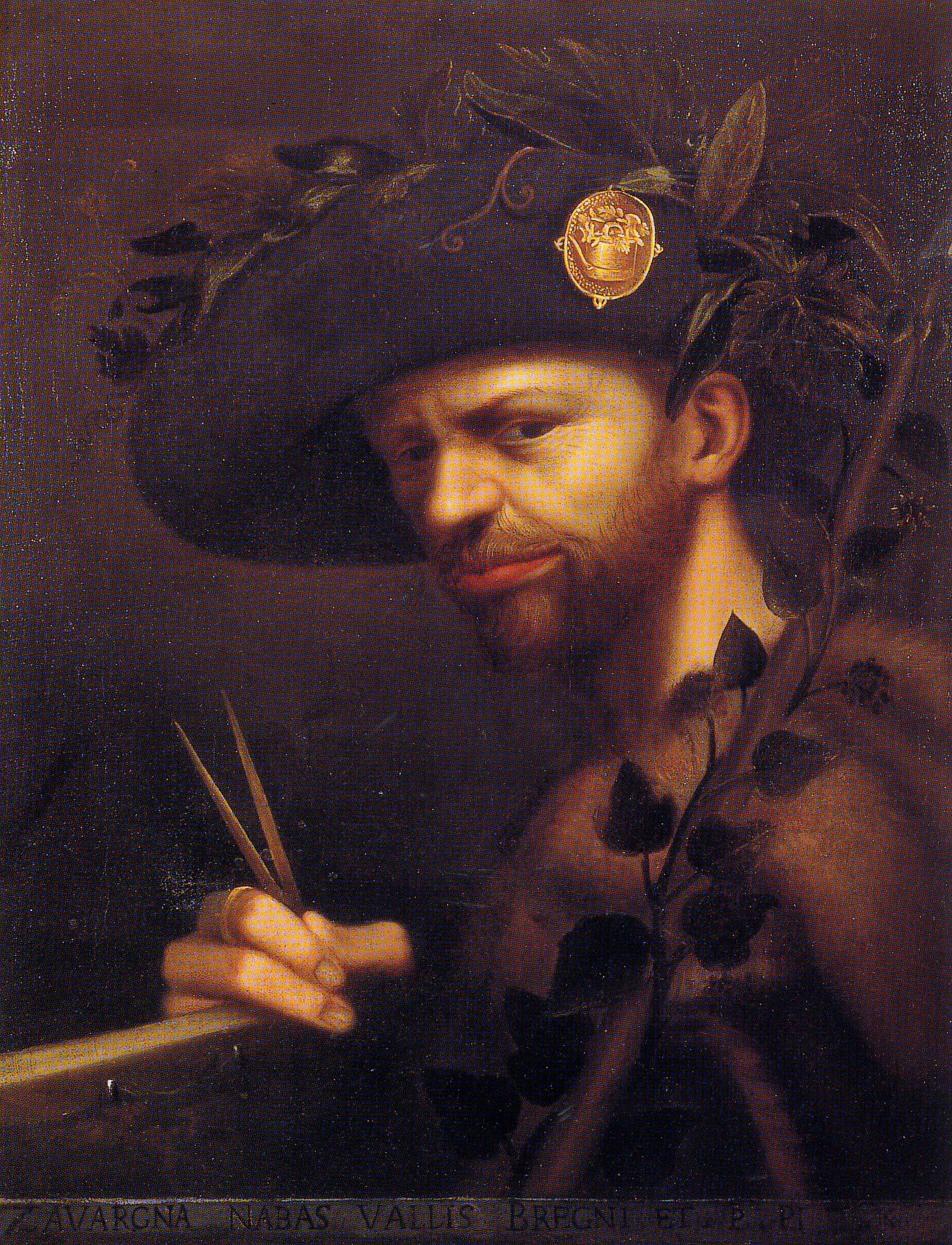
Gian Paolo Lomazzo, Self-Portrait in the Costume of the Abbot of the Accademia della Val di Blenio (ca. 1658. Pinacoteca di Brera, Milan)

Self-Portrait in the Costume of the Abbot of the Accademia della Val di Blenio is a ca.1568 oil on canvas painting by Giovan Paolo Lomazzo, now in the Pinacoteca di Brera in Milan. It is signed in capitals at the bottom ZAVARGNA.NABAS.VALLIS.BREGNI.ET.IPL.PITR 15[...] (compà Zavargna was the artist's academy name).

== History ==
The Accademia della Val di Blenio gathered artists, artisans, goldsmiths, musicians and actors, declaring themselves interested by ancient Roman Bacchic rites, creative 'furor' and the bizarre and grotesque inspiration typical of Mannerism. Its members created pseudonyms and fictional alter-egos, meeting under the guise of commoners (specifically those from the Blenio area, known for its distinctive accent) and underwent secret initiations during Carlo Borromeo's severe and ascectic Counter-Reformation in Lombardy.

In 1568, Lomazzo was made the Accademia's nabàd (i.e. prior) and so in this work showed himself with its insignia, a thyrsus covered with ivy and an intertwined vine wreath, inspired by the iconography of Bacchus. The other elements are explained in a passage written in "facchinesca" language (a kind of incomprehensible dialect inspired by the inflexions of the upper Como and the Canton of Ticino) in the Introducigliògn to the Rabìsch dra Academiglia dor compà Zavargna (the collection of the "facchini"'s poems) - the "Pèll d'or cavrètt" hat and the straw "capelàsc" are symbols of humility, while the medal on the hat represents a sort of watering can, the Accademia's seal, which refers to the idea of Dionysian intoxication via colossal and orgiastic drinking through an open mouth.

Some critics have seen in its composition a precedent for Caravaggio's Young Sick Bacchus.
