= Santa Maria Canale, Tortona =

Church in Tortona, Italy

Coordinates: 44°54′49.01554″N 8°58′2.06602″E

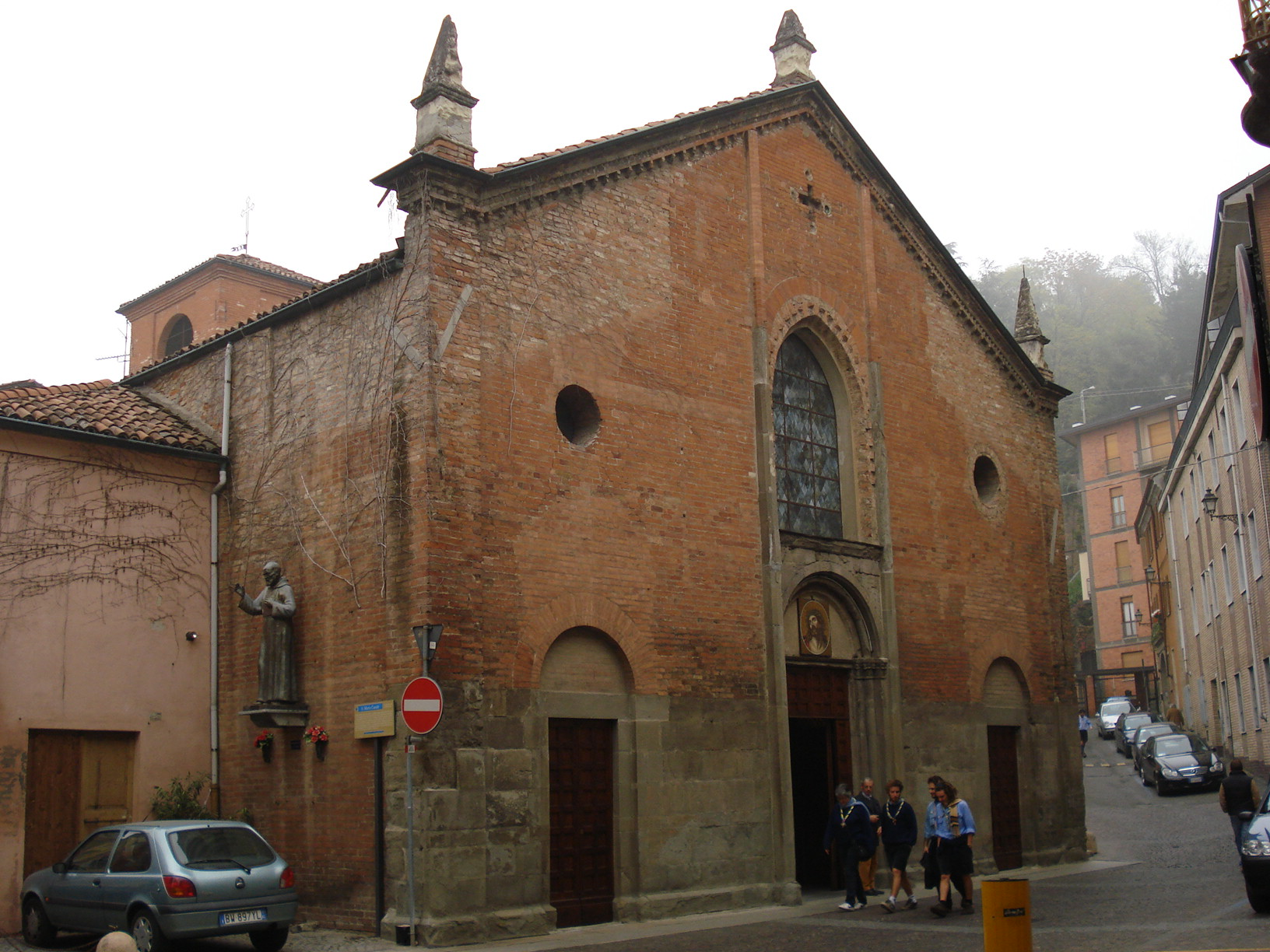
Santa Maria Canale

Santa Maria Canale is a Romanesque-style Roman Catholic church located in Tortona, Province of Alessandria, region of Piedmont, Italy.

== History ==
A church at the site is documented from 1151, and some of the structural elements of that church persist. The rectangular apse and the chapels date from the mid 1500s. The facade underwent restoration in 1853. The interior has some 15th-century frescoes, but most of the decoration was added by Rodolfo Gambini in 1918. The church has a 17th-century Annunciation by Fiamminghino; paintings by a pupil of Bernardino Campi named Brandimarte della Torre, by the 17th-century painter Giuseppe Vermiglio and by the 20th-century Gambini.
