= Luisa Ottolini =

Italian physicist

Luisa Ottolini (born July 10, 1954, in Tortona, province of Alessandria, Italy) is an Italian physicist.

== Biography ==
In 1978, Luisa Ottolini graduated in Physics at the University of Pavia. From 1982 to 1986, she was the Head of the Structuristic Section at the Istituto Sperimentale dei Metalli Leggeri (I.S.M.L.) in Novara. In 1987, she activated the Strategic Project of the National Research Council of Italy (CNR) An Ion Microprobe for Advanced Researches in the Earth Sciences with the installation at the “Centro di Studio per la Cristallografia Strutturale” in Pavia of the first, and so far, the only one National Laboratory of Secondary Ion Mass Spectrometry (SIMS) in the Earth Sciences. Since that time she has been the Head of the SIMS Lab. Starting from 1989, she activated the National SIMS service for University and CNR Institutions offering the Earth Science Committee (05), following more than 90 research projects. In 2002-2005 she coordinated a research Unit in Pavia, sponsored by the European Framework Project EUROMELT (European Community’s Human Potential Programme, contract HPRN-CT-2002-00211). Between December 2005 and September 2017 she was the Head of CNR-Institute of Geosciences and Geo-resources (IGG)-Section of Pavia.

She has co-authored more than 150 international ISI publications, of which 5 in Nature; more than 200 Abstracts at International and National Meetings, 35 monographs and inner reports.

== Main scientific interests ==
Her research activities mainly concerned the use of SIMS for the quantitative measurement of low-concentration constituents, of light (Lithium, Beryllium and Boron) and volatile elements (Hydrogen, Fluorine, Chlorine, Carbon) in geological samples, with particular reference to the investigation of the physical/chemical processes underlying the production of secondary ions, aiming at overcoming the limitations of the technique (interferences and non-linear effects, “matrix effects”); the development, set up and optimization of SIMS procedures for trace elements, light and volatile elements, and ultra-trace elements in the frame of petrologic, geochemical and crystal-chemical studies, with particular reference to the investigation of melt inclusions, silicate minerals, artificial glasses, chemically-complex silicate and non-silicate matrixes, experimental charges.

== Awards and honors ==
- 2004 - Awards from CNR in the celebration of the 80th anniversary of the foundation of CNR, as one of the 12 CNR female researchers who contributed to the development of the scientific progress of Italy.
- 2004 - The name of Ferri-ottoliniite to a new amphibole end-member (IMA-CNMMN 2001-67A) to acknowledge the “fundamental contribution of L. Ottolini to the advancement of ion-probe analysis of minerals, with particular reference to light elements”.
- 2006 - Inclusion of L. Ottolini in Who’s Who in the World (23rd Edition by Marquis, Who’s Who, Philadelphia, PA, USA) and in Who's Who in Science and Engineering.
- Since 2013 - Partner of the University of Liège.
