= Carlo Perosi =

Catholic cardinal

His Eminence Carlo Perosi
- Secretary of the Consistorial Congregation
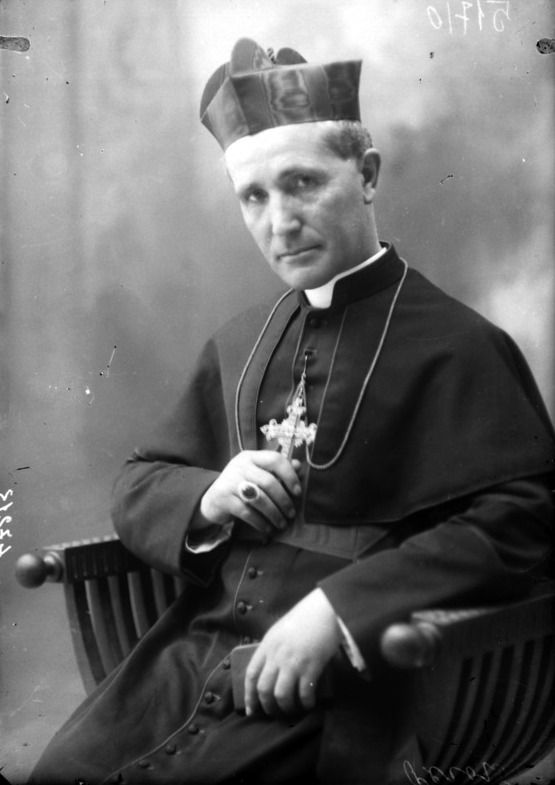
- Church: Roman Catholic Church
- Appointed: 1 November 1928
- Term ended: 22 February 1930
- Predecessor: Gaetano de Lai
- Successor: Raffaele Carlo Rossi
- Other posts: Cardinal-Deacon of Sant'Eustachio (1926-30); Superior-General of the Scalabrinians (1928-30)
- Previous posts: Regent of the Apostolic Penitentiary (1911-16); Assessor of the Congregation of the Holy Office (1916-26); Pro-Secretary of the Consistorial Congregation (1928)

Orders
- Ordination: 8 November 1891
- Created cardinal: 21 June 1926 by Pope Pius XI
- Rank: Cardinal-Deacon

Personal details
- Born: Carlo Perosi; 18 December 1868 Tortona, Kingdom of Sardinia
- Died: 22 February 1930 (aged 61) Rome, Kingdom of Italy
- Buried: Campo Verano (1930-59); Tortona Cathedral
- Parents: Giuseppe Perosi; Carolina Bernardi
- Education: Pontifical Gregorian University
- Motto: Per crucem ad lucem

Styles of Carlo Perosi
- Reference style: His Eminence
- Spoken style: Your Eminence
- Informal style: Cardinal
- See: none

Carlo Perosi (18 December 1868 – 22 February 1930) was an Italian Cardinal of the Roman Catholic Church who served as Secretary of the Sacred Consistorial Congregation from 1928 until his death, and was elevated to the cardinalate in 1926.

== Biography ==
Carlo Perosi was born in Tortona as one of twelve children, only six of whom survived infancy; he was the brother of Father Lorenzo Perosi and Marziano Perosi. He attended the seminary in Tortona, and was ordained to the priesthood on 8 November 1891. He then went to Rome, where he studied at the Pontifical Gregorian University and the Pontifical Lombard Seminary, alongside Luigi Sincero and Mario Nasalli Rocca di Corneliano.

Upon returning to Tortona, Perosi undertook his pastoral ministry, also serving as a diocesan official and professor and vice-rector at its seminary. He became counselor adjunct for the Provincial Councils in Rome on 21 September 1904, and apostolic visitor to the seminaries of Sicily in 1907. He was raised to the rank of Domestic Prelate of His Holiness on 15 May 1907.

On 20 October 1908, Perosi entered the service of the Roman Curia as substitute of the Sacred Consistorial Congregation. He was later appointed regent of the Apostolic Penitentiary (7 December 1911), canon of the Liberian Basilica (1915), assessor of the Holy Office (8 December 1916), and canon of St. Peter's Basilica (6 March 1917).

Elevated to the College of Cardinals before receiving his episcopal consecration, Perosi was created Cardinal-Deacon of S. Eustachio by Pope Pius XI in the consistory of 21 June 1926. He was named Pro-Secretary of the Sacred Consistorial Congregation on 10 February 1928, rising to become full Secretary on the following 1 November. As Secretary, Perosi was effectively the head of that dicastery, as the Pope held the nominal title of Prefect at that time.

The Cardinal died in Rome, at age 61, and was buried at the Campo Verano.

Lorenzo Perosi dedicated the score of his oratorio Il sogno interpretato to the memory of his brother Carlo.

Catholic Church titles
Preceded by Gaetano de Lai	Secretary of the Sacred Consistorial Congregation; 1928—1930	Succeeded by Raffaele Rossi, OCD
