= Aurelio Luini =

Italian painter

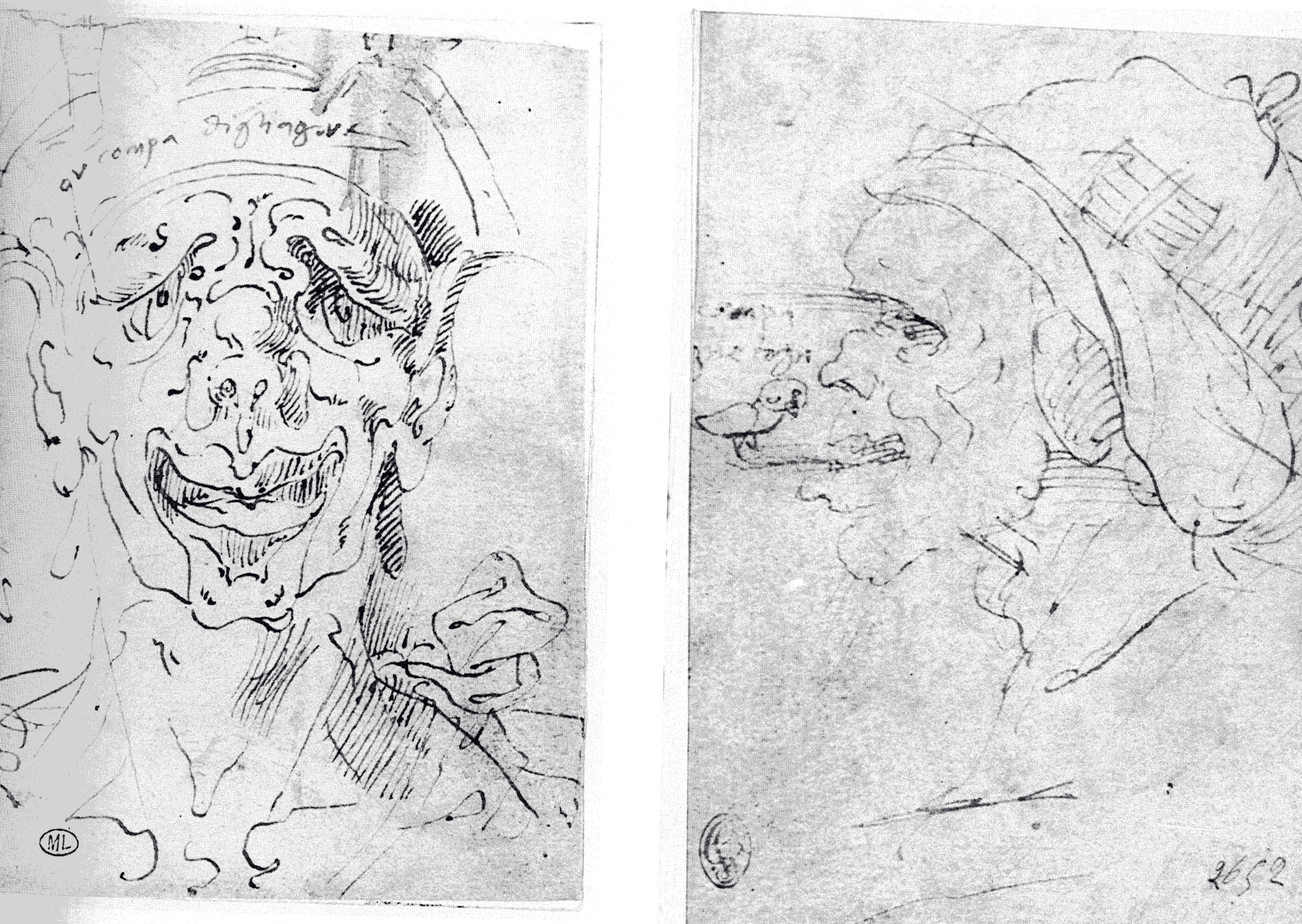
Ol compà Digliagòr and Ol compà Braghetògn , two caricatures. Pinacoteca Ambrosiana, Milan.

Aurelio Luini (c. 1530–1593) was an Italian painter and draughtsman from Milan, the fourth and last son of Bernardino Luini. A representative of late Lombard Mannerism, he was a friend of Gian Paolo Lomazzo.

== Biography ==
Aurelio Luini was the son of Bernardino Luini and his wife, Margherita Lomazzo. Beginning in 1555, he worked alongside his brother, Giovan Pietro, on the fresco decoration of the church of San Maurizio al Monastero Maggiore in Milan—a project characterized by a blend of Lombard influences (such as those of Vincenzo Foppa) and elements from the Forlivese school of art (notably Melozzo da Forlì). Together with his brother, Aurelio also created the fresco cycle in the Bergamini Chapel, commissioned by the abbess Gerolama Brivio for 60 gold scudi. This cycle includes The Resurrection of Christ and The Three Thieves at the Tomb (primarily the work of Giovan Pietro), as well as The Meeting of Saint Mary Magdalene with Christ and Christ at Emmaus (a collaborative effort, with the figure on the left executed by Aurelio).

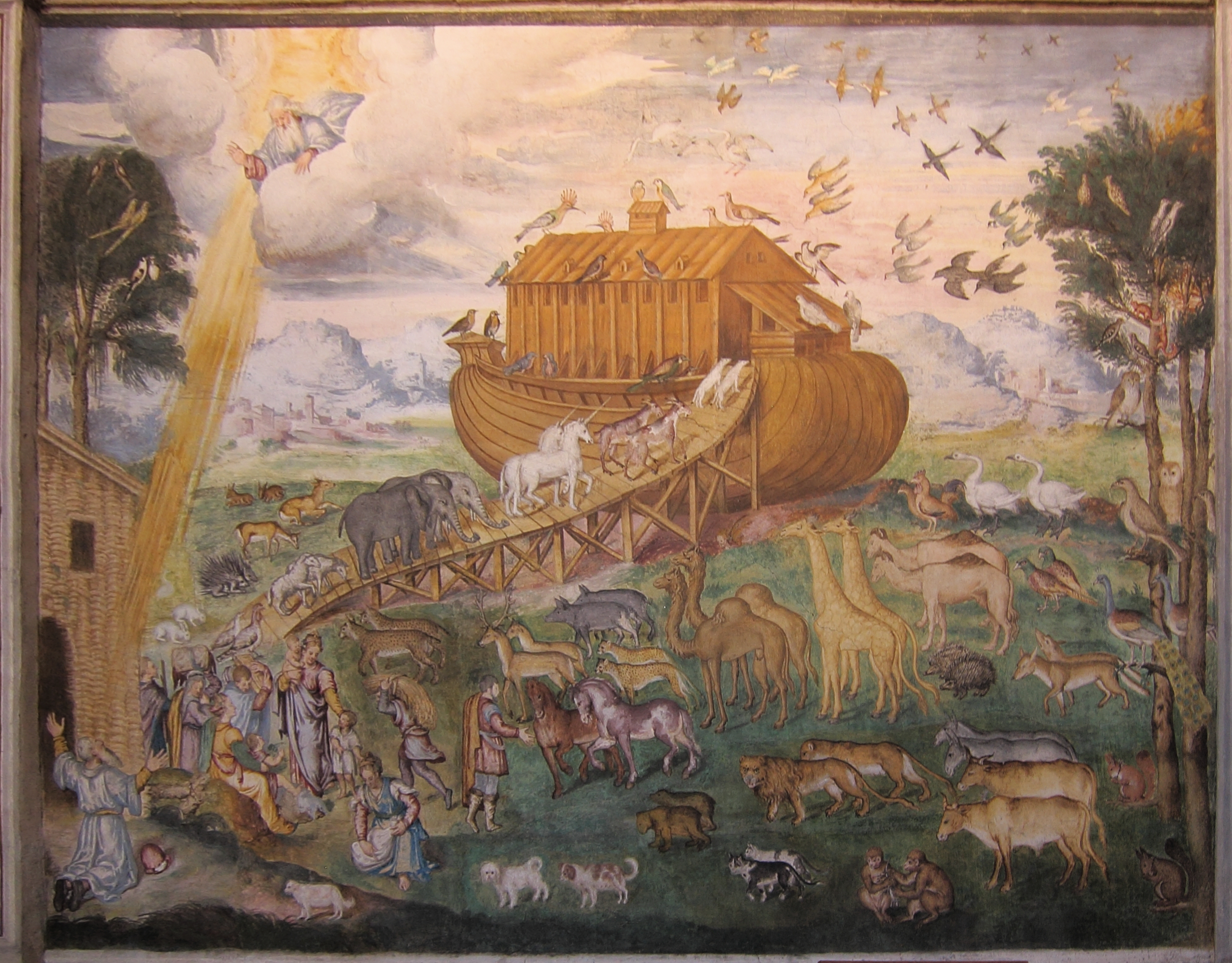
Rising in Noah's ark, painted by Aurelio Luini, ca. 1556. San Maurizio al Monastero Maggiore Church, Milan, Italy.

In 1560, Luini painted the fresco The Assumption of the Virgin on the partition wall of the convent of Santa Maria Assunta in Cairate. His later works include a dramatic Pietà for San Barnaba, Milan, frescoes in the Church of Santa Maria di Campagna in Pallanza created in collaboration with Carlo Urbino, frescoes from the Church of San Vincenzo alle Monache in Milan now housed in the Pinacoteca di Brera, a painting of Saint Thecla for Milan Cathedral, and a Madonna with Saints Roch and Sebastian for Tortona Cathedral. In 1570, Luini painted an altarpiece depicting the Holy Family for the Carthusian hospice at Porta Ticinese. In 1590, he painted the organ shutters for Milan Cathedral and, the following year, produced a series of drawings illustrating the life of Saint Ambrose, likely intended for the choir stalls. The extensive apse decoration in the church of Santi Gervasio e Protasio ad Monachos is also attributed to Luini and includes a monumental depiction of Pentecost.

Aurelio Luini owned Leonardo's The Virgin and Child with Saint Anne and Saint John the Baptist (now in the National Gallery), as well as a lost libricciolo (small book) containing Leonardo's sketches of grotesque heads. A friend of Gian Paolo Lomazzo, he was also a member of Lomazzo’s unconventional Accademia della Val di Blenio under the name "compà Lovign". Like Lomazzo, he encountered difficulties with ecclesiastical censorship; a decree issued by Archbishop Charles Borromeo in 1581, for instance, briefly prohibited him from painting. In his Trattato della Pittura (1584, pp. 200, 534), Lomazzo praises Luini's exceptional skills in anatomy, depicting human emotions, lighting and landscapes.
