= Tortona =

Tortona Torton-a (Piedmontese)
- Comune
- Comune di Tortona
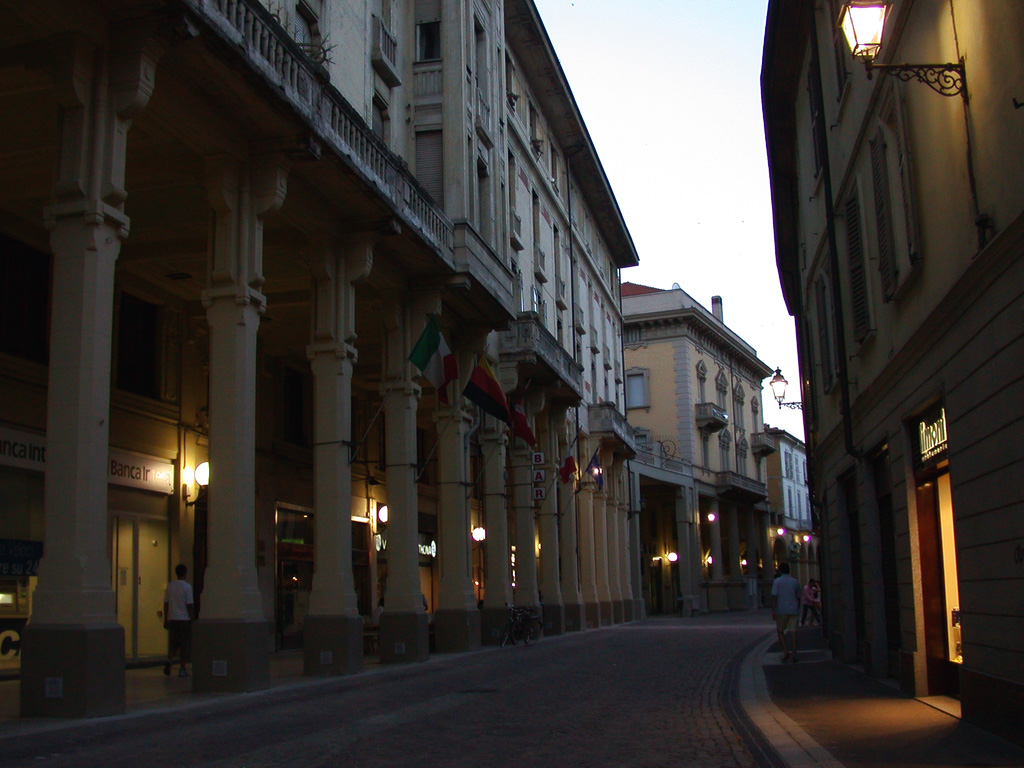

- Coat of arms

- Location within Italy Location within Piedmont
- Coordinates: 44°53′39″N 08°51′56″E
- Country: Italy
- Region: Piedmont
- Province: Alessandria (AL)
- Frazioni: Torre Garofoli, Rivalta Scrivia, Vho, Mombisaggio, Castellar Ponzano, Bettole di Tortona, Torre Calderai

Government
  - Mayor: Federico Chiodi

Area
  - Total: 99.66 km^{2} (38.48 sq mi)
- Elevation: 122 m (400 ft)

Population (1 January 2021)
  - Total: 26,713
  - Density: 268.0/km^{2} (694.2/sq mi)
- Demonym: Tortonesi
- Time zone: UTC+1 (CET)
  - Summer (DST): UTC+2 (CEST)
- Postal code: 15057
- Dialing code: 0131
- ISTAT code: 006174
- Patron saint: St. Marcian of Tortona
- Saint day: 6 March
- Website: Official website

Tortona (Italian: [torˈtoːna]; Piedmontese: Torton-a [tʊrˈtʊŋa], locally [tʊrˈtɔŋa]; Latin: Dertona) is a comune of Piemonte, in the Province of Alessandria, Italy. Tortona is sited on the right bank of the Scrivia between the plain of Marengo and the foothills of the Ligurian Apennines. Its frazione of Vho is one of I Borghi più belli d'Italia ("The most beautiful villages of Italy").

== History ==
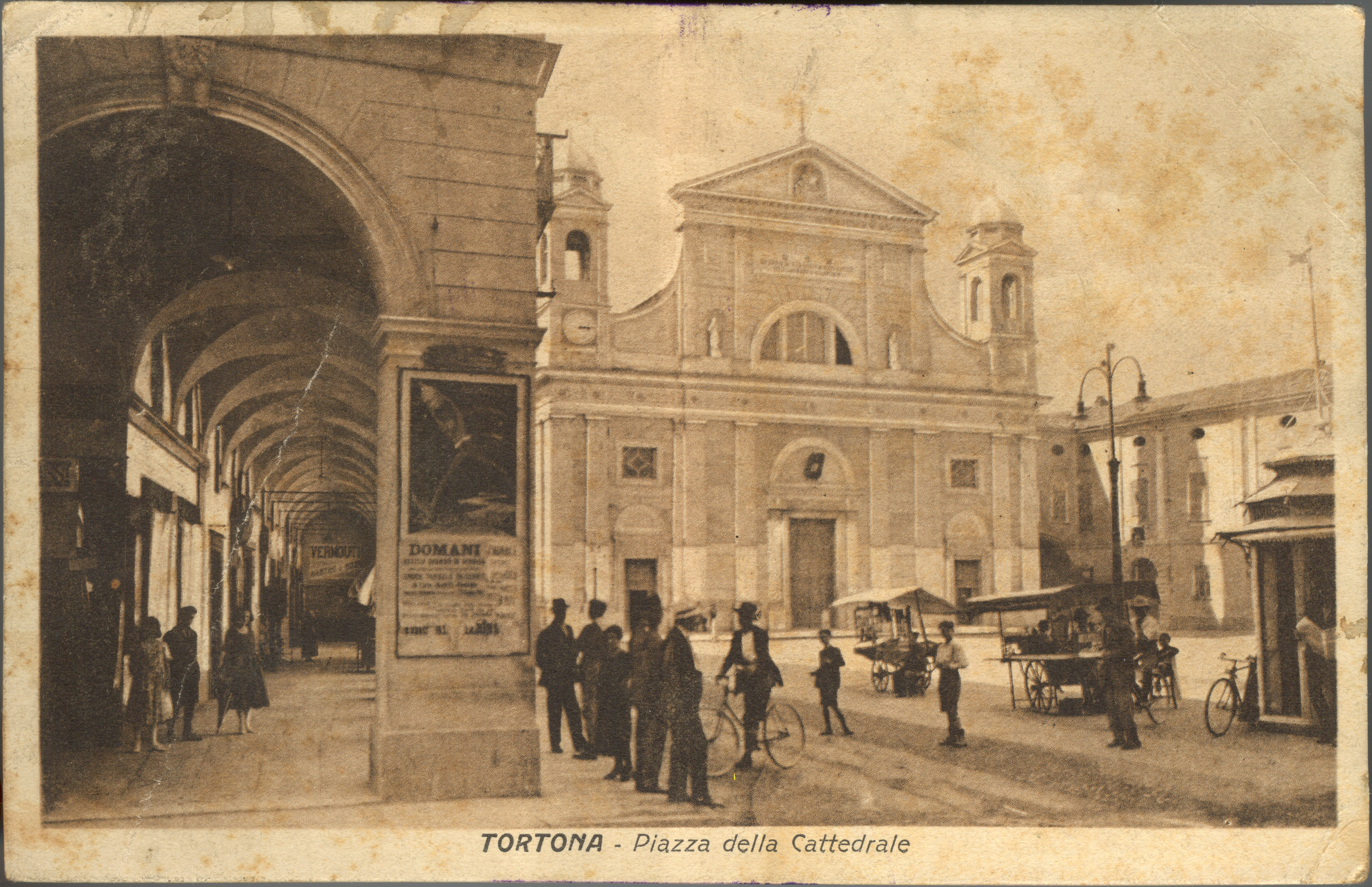
Tortona Cathedral (postcard from c. 1890)

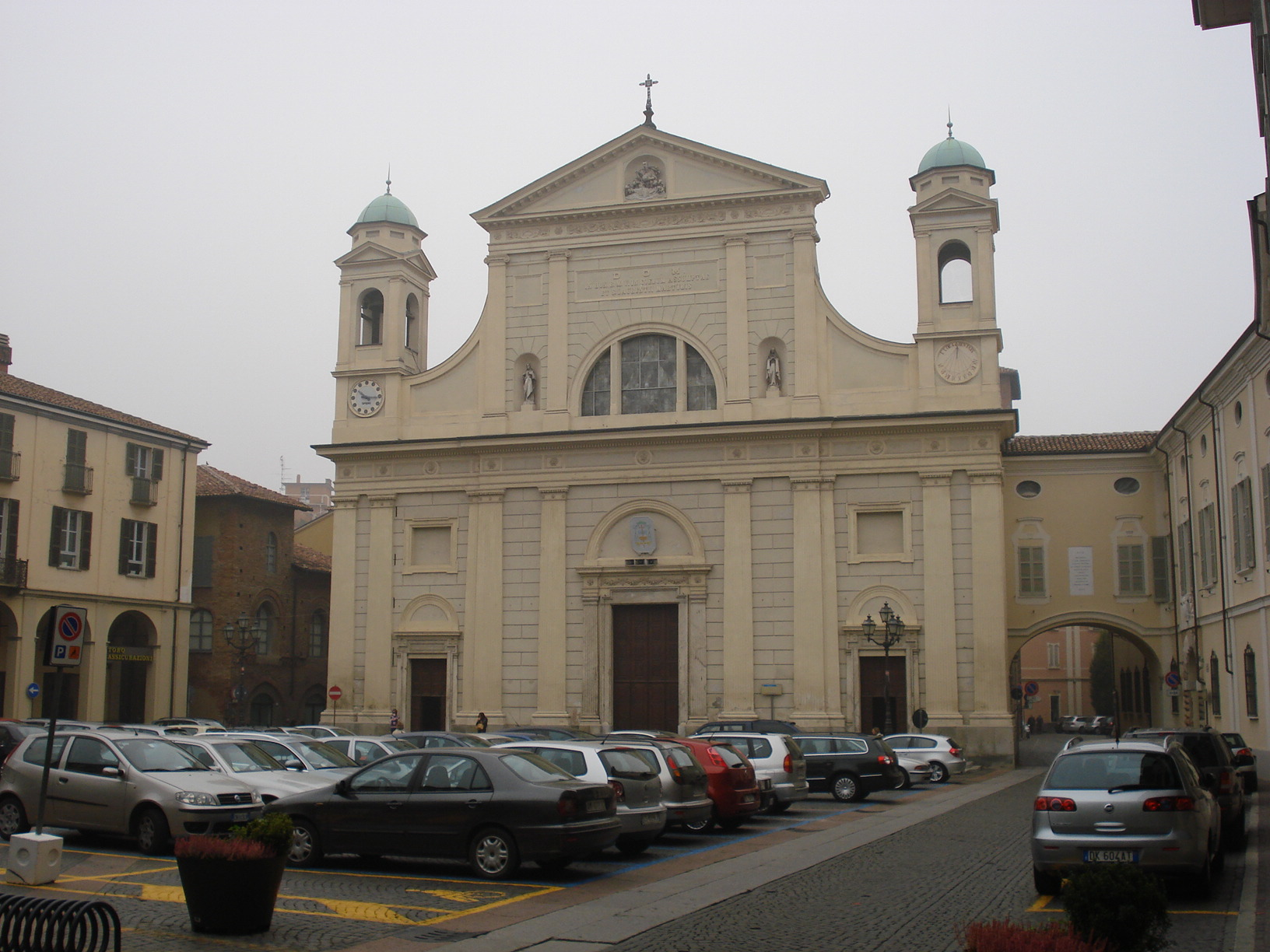
Piazza Duomo, with the cathedral and on the right the bishops' palace

Known in ancient times as Dertona, the city was probably the oldest colony under Roman rule in the westernmost section of the Valley of the Po, on the road leading from Genua (Genoa) to Placentia (Piacenza). The city was founded c. 123–118 BC at the junction of the great roads; the Via Postumia and the Via Aemilia Scauri which merged to become the Via Julia Augusta. The site made Dertona an important military station under the Romans. Strabo speaks of it as one of the most considerable towns in this part of Italy, and from Pliny wrote that it was a Roman colony. Velleius mentions it among those founded under the Republic, it appears to have been recolonised under Augustus; some inscriptions therefore give it the title of Julia Dertona. The assassin of Caesar, Brutus, encamped at Dertona on his march in pursuit of Mark Antony, after the Battle of Mutina, and it was one of the places where a body of troops was usually stationed during the later ages of the empire.

A bishopric was founded at Tortona early, but its first bishops are purely legendary, like Saint Marcianus of Tortona, called the first bishop of Piedmont and a disciple of Barnabas, the companion of Paul. Until the 9th century, the city was under the rule of its bishop; in 1090 it became a free commune with the name of Terdona. In 1133 the diocese was separated from the archbishopric of Milan to the new archdiocese of Genoa (CE "Lombardy").

During the Middle Ages, Tortona was a faithful ally of the Guelphs and was destroyed several times, notably by Frederick Barbarossa, who captured it after a siege in 1155 and razed all its buildings to the ground. From 1260 to 1347 the city was dominated by a series of different Italian noble families and adventurers. In 1347, Tortona was decisively incorporated into the territories of the Duchy of Milan, under which remained until 1735. One of the rulers in this period was Facino Cane, who in the unsettled affairs of Lombardy had assembled a string of lordships and great wealth which he bequeathed to his wife, Beatrice, and arranged with his friends that a marriage should be effected between her and Filippo Maria Visconti. According to Machiavelli "By this union Filippo became powerful, and reacquired Milan and the whole of Lombardy. By way of being grateful for these numerous favors, as princes commonly are, he accused Beatrice of adultery and caused her to be put to death". Then following the vicissitudes of the War of the Polish Succession, the city was occupied by the King of Sardinia, and "count of Tortona" was added to the titles of the House of Savoy.

== Colli Tortonesi ==
Tortona is the capital of an area known as Colli Tortonesi, which stretches from the town to the border with Liguria. The area is known for the variety and of its products and for the intensive wine production, including Barbera, Dolcetto, Moscato and Timorasso, the autochthonous wine of the region which traces its origin back to the 14th century. Truffles are another important fruit of this land and the Colli Tortonesi is the only place in Piedmont to have three varieties of truffle: White truffle, Black Truffle and scorzone.

== Main sights ==
- Roman remains, traditionally identified as the Mausoleum of the Roman Emperor Maiorianus.
- Palazzo Guidobono (15th century), restructured in 1939 to bring back its Gothic façade. It has traces of Renaissance frescoes.
- The cathedral (mid-16th century). The façade is a neoclassicist addition of the 19th century. The interior has works by Camillo Procaccini, Aurelio Luini and others. It houses also the relics of St. Martianus, patron of Tortona, and the tombs of many important religious figures, including Don Lorenzo Perosi and his brother Cardinal Carlo Perosi.
- Liceo Giuseppe Peano, built in the 19th century.
- The Bishops' Palace (1584), with a noteworthy Renaissance portal. It has a triptych of Madonna with Child and Saints by Macrino d'Alba (1499).
- Abbey of Santa Maria di Rivalta, in the frazione of Rivalta Scrivia. It is a Romanesque structure founded before 1151. It houses several 15th-century frescoes.
- Church of San Matteo
- Church of Santa Maria Canale
- Church of Santa Giustina e Sant'Agnese

== People ==
People born in Tortona, or with close links to the town, include:

- Saint Marcian of Tortona (died perhaps around 120 CE) is traditionally said to have been the first bishop of Tortona.
- Saint Innocent of Tortona (died c. 350), who survived the persecutions and was sent as bishop to Tortona by Pope Sylvester.
- Bishop Gezo of Tortona in the 10th century wrote a Treatise on the Body and Blood of the Lord.
- Marziano da Tortona, secretary to Duke Filippo Maria Visconti of Milan, is one of the people credited with inventing the card game of Tarocchi .
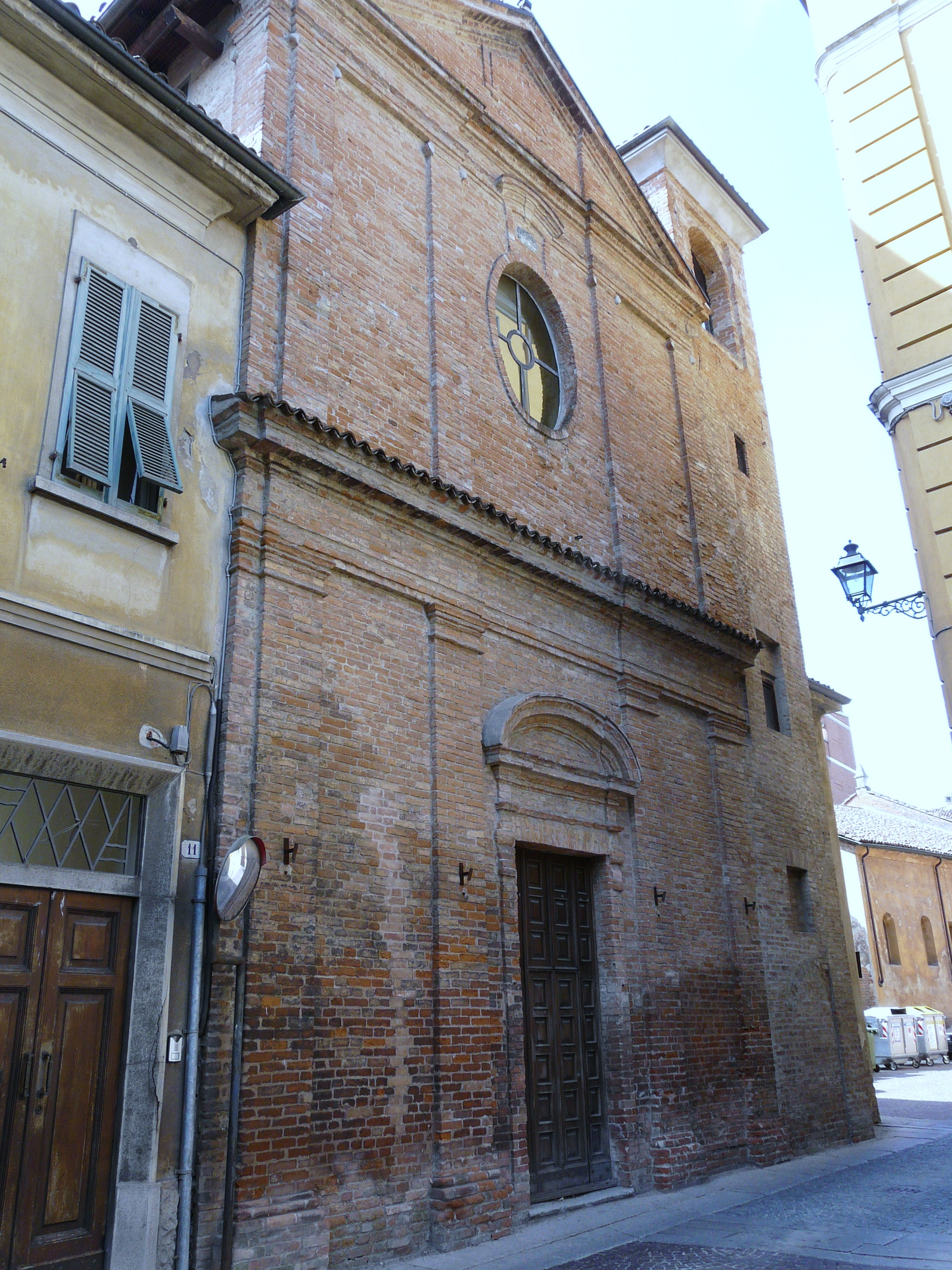
  Ancient church in the town center
- Cesare Saccaggi (1868-1934), painter.
- Saint Luigi Orione (1872–1940) founded the Sanctuary of the Madonna della Guardia in Tortona.
- Lorenzo Perosi (1872–1956), an associate of Orione, was a composer of church music and "Perpetual Director" of the Sistine Choir.
- Marziano Perosi (1875–1959), composer, organist, choir director, and brother of Lorenzo.
- Fausto Coppi (1919–1960), Italian racing cyclist.
- Giuseppe Campora (1923–2004), operatic tenor.
- Enrico Bellone (1938-2011), physicist and writer.
- Ivo Milazzo (1947-), Italian comic book artist.
- Luisa Ottolini (1954-), Italian physicist.
- Majorian (420–461), Western Roman Emperor from 457 until his death, is said to have died here.
- Judith of Bavaria (c. 805–843), Holy Roman Empress and Queen of the Franks, was exiled to Tortona (when her husband Louis the Pious was briefly overthrown) in 833, and rescued in 834.
- Ufomammut (active 1999-), doom metal band.
- Alessandro Pier Guidi (born 1983), racing driver

== Twin towns ==
- Privas, France
- Weilburg, Germany (until 2008)
- Zevenaar, The Netherlands
- Jiangyin, People's Republic of China
- Għarb, Malta

== See also ==
- Diocese of Tortona
- In geology, the Tortonian Age of the Miocene Epoch is named for Tortona

== Sources ==
- The Princeton Encyclopedia of Classical Sites (eds. Richard Stillwell, William L. MacDonald, Marian Holland McAllister)
- Dictionary of Greek and Roman Geography (1854) (ed. William Smith, LLD)
