= San Matteo, Tortona =

Church in Tortona, Italy

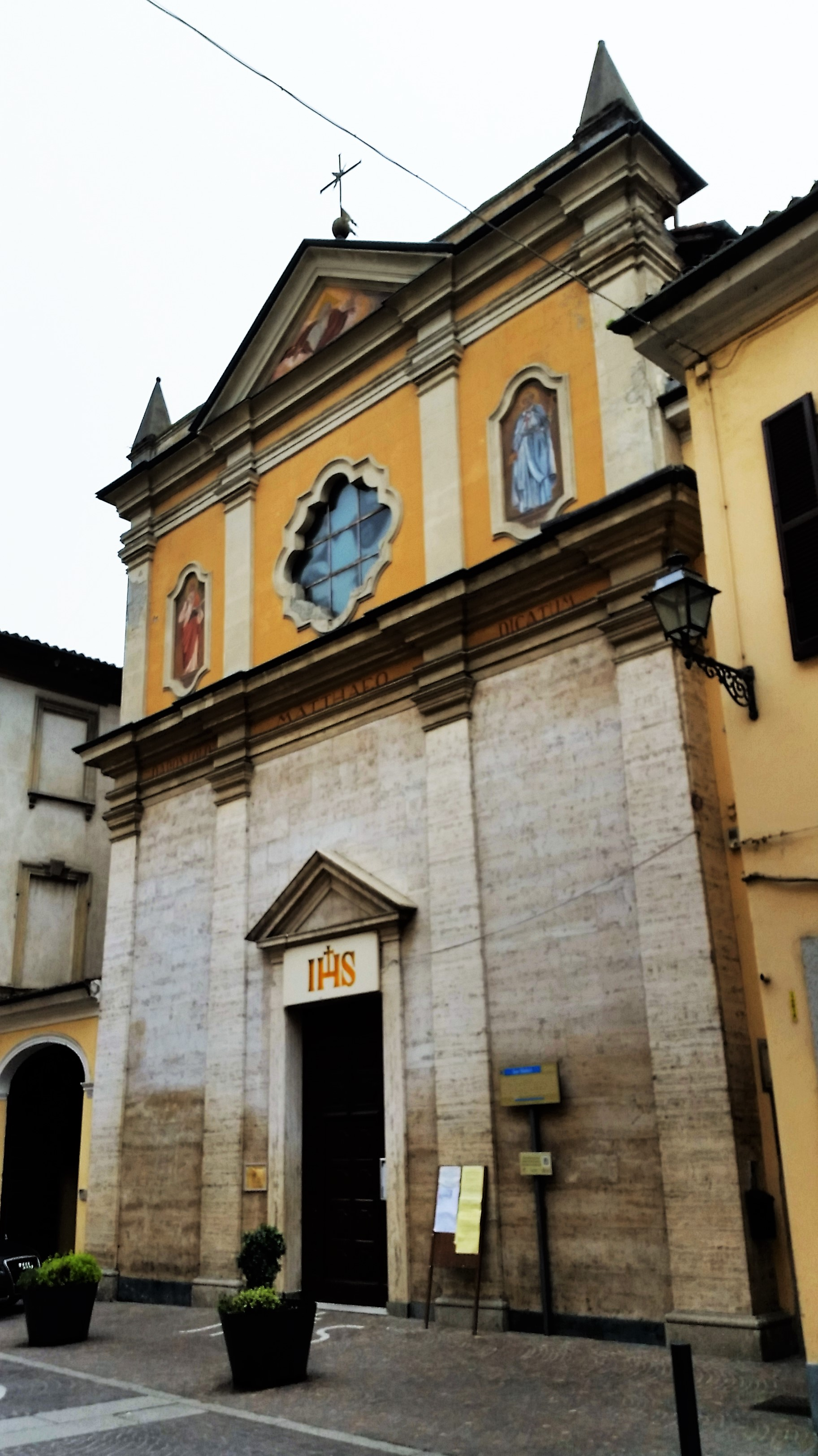
Facade of the Church of San Matteo, Tortona, Italy

San Matteo is a Baroque style, Roman Catholic church located in Tortona, Province of Alessandria, region of Piedmont, Italy.

== History ==
The church was erected in the 12th century by the Order of Canons Regular of the Lateran of the Cross of Mortara, reconstructed by the Dominican order at the end of the 17th-century. It passed on the Order of the Crociferi. The most recent reconstruction was in 1961. The interior houses the 13th-century canvas of the Madonna col Bambino by Barnaba da Modena.
