= Santa Giustina e Sant'Agnese =

Church in Italy

Coordinates: 44°53′36″N 8°48′12″E

Santa Giustina e Sant'Agnese di Torre Garofoli is a 16th-century Roman Catholic church in Tortona, Province of Alessandria, region of Piedmont, Italy.

== History ==
This church was built in the 16th century, and made into a parish in 1595 under the patronage of Giustina Garofoli and consecrated by Bishop Maffeo Gambara. In 1726, the church was restored by Baron Boniforte Guidobono-Cavalchini-Garofoli, and again in 1880 by Baron Vittorio Emanuele. The dedication to Sant'Agnese was added at this time. The interior includes paintings by Camillo Procaccini transferred here after the closure of the Franciscan church and convent of Tortona.
