= Gaetano de Lai =

Italian cardinal (1853-1928)

His Eminence Gaetano de Lai
- Secretary of the Sacred Consistorial Congregation
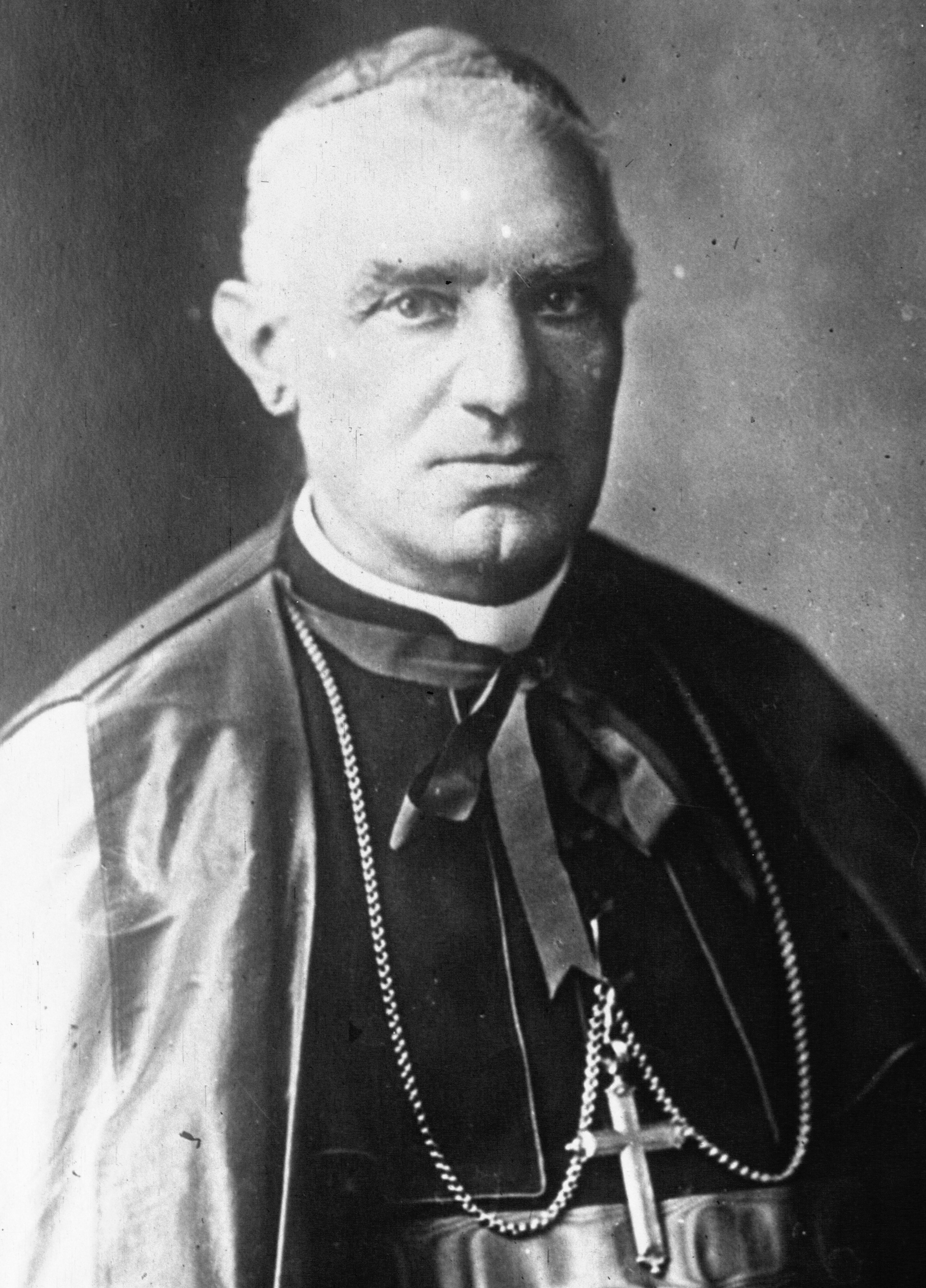
- Church: Catholic Church
- Appointed: October 20, 1908
- Term ended: October 24, 1928
- Predecessor: Carlo Nocella
- Successor: Carlo Perosi
- Other post: Cardinal-Bishop of Sabina–Poggio Mirteto (1911–1928)
- Previous posts: Secretary of the Congregation of the Council (1903–1908); Cardinal-Deacon of San Nicola in Carcere (1907–1911)

Orders
- Ordination: April 16, 1876 by Costantino Patrizi Naro
- Consecration: December 17, 1911 by Pope Pius X
- Created cardinal: December 16, 1907 by Pope Pius X
- Rank: Cardinal-Deacon (1907–1911); Cardinal-Bishop (1911–1928)

Personal details
- Born: July 30, 1853 Malo, Kingdom of Lombardy–Venetia
- Died: October 24, 1928 (aged 75) Rome, Kingdom of Italy

Gaetano de Lai (July 30, 1853 – October 24, 1928) was an Italian Catholic prelate who served as secretary of the Sacred Consistorial Congregation (now the Dicastery for Bishops) from 1908 until his death in 1928. He was named a cardinal by Pope Pius X in 1907.

== Biography ==
Gaetano de Lai was born on July 30, 1853, in Malo, then part of the Kingdom of Lombardy–Venetia. He was the son of Antonio and Maria (née Silvagni) de Lai; he had two sisters, Adelaide and Antonia Pietra. He studied at the seminary of Vicenza from 1867 to 1870, and then at the Pontifical Roman Athenaeum Saint Apollinare from 1870 to 1876.

On April 16, 1876, de Lai was ordained to the priesthood by the Cardinal Vicar, Costantino Patrizi Naro. He then served as a staff member of the Congregation of the Council (now the Dicastery for the Clergy) in the Roman Curia. In 1887, he was charged with the visitation of several dioceses; through this role, he met and formed a lasting friendship with Giuseppe Sarto, then Bishop of Mantua. Following Sarto's election as Pope Pius X in August 1903, de Lai was promoted to secretary of the Congregation of the Council on November 11, 1903.

De Lai was created Cardinal-Deacon of San Nicola in Carcere by Pius X in the consistory of December 16, 1907. The following year, on October 20, 1908, he was named secretary of the Sacred Consistorial Congregation (now the Dicastery for Bishops)—a position he would hold until death. As leader of the congregation, he oversaw the selection of most new bishops and the formation of new dioceses.

During the papacy of Pius X (1903–1914), de Lai was one of the Pope's closest confidants and became known as his "uomo forte" ("strong man"). When Pius reorganized the Curia in 1908, de Lai served as president of the commission to implement his reforms. He was also a strong supporter of Monsignor Umberto Benigni and his initiative Sodalitium Pianum, which aimed to enforce the Pope's condemnation of Modernism. His influence within the Curia continued to grow with his appointment as a member of the Holy Office, Roman Rota, Congregation of the Council, Congregation for Religious, Congregation for Ceremonial, and Congregation for Extraordinary Ecclesiastical Affairs.

On November 27, 1911, Pius X elevated de Lai to the rank of Cardinal-Bishop and assigned him to the suburbicarian see of Sabina. As such, he received his episcopal consecration on the following December 17 from Pius X in the Sistine Chapel, with Archbishop Augusto Silj and Bishop Agostino Zampini serving as co-consecrators. Following the death of Pius X, de Lai served as a cardinal elector in the 1914 conclave to elect his successor. During the conclave, according to the diary of Cardinal Friedrich Gustav Piffl, de Lai was a leader of the conservative faction that sought continuity with Pius X's policies and supported the unsuccessful candidacy of Cardinal Domenico Serafini. When the more progressive Cardinal Giacomo della Chiesa was elected, de Lai demanded that the ballots be examined to verify that della Chiesa had not voted for himself, which would have invalidated his election. Della Chiesa's election was verified and he took the name Benedict XV.

Despite his opposition to della Chiesa in the conclave, de Lai was allowed to remain as head of the Consistorial Congregation but his influence was diminished. In his 1915 motu proprio Seminaria clericorum, Benedict XV removed the oversight of seminaries from the Consistorial Congregation and transferred it to the newly established Congregation of Seminaries and Universities. In 1919, de Lai became vice-dean of the College of Cardinals.

Following Benedict XV's death, de Lai participated in the 1922 conclave. He supported the conservative Cardinal Rafael Merry del Val over Benedict's Secretary of State, Cardinal Pietro Gasparri. When neither Merry del Val nor Gasparri appeared able to secure the required two-thirds majority, Cardinal Achille Ratti emerged as a compromise candidate. Years later, under oath during the beatification process for Merry del Val, one witness claimed that de Lai had offered the conservative faction's votes to Ratti if he promised not to keep Gasparri as Secretary of State. However, as Pope Pius XI, Ratti retained both Gasparri and de Lai in their roles.

On the occasion of the 1925 Jubilee, de Lai was charged with the ceremonial opening of the Holy Door of the Basilica of Saint Paul Outside the Walls in December 1924 and its closing a year later. In August 1924, he was named apostolic administrator of the Diocese of Poggio Mirteto, which was later united with his suburbicarian see of Sabina in June 1925.

De Lai fell ill with pneumonia in March 1927 and never fully recovered. He died on October 24, 1928, at the age of 75. He was buried in the Campo Verano cemetery in Rome until 1929, when his remains were transferred to his native Malo.

Catholic Church titles
Preceded by Carlo Nocella	Secretary of the Sacred Consistorial Congregation; 1908—1928	Succeeded by Carlo Perosi
Preceded by Francesco di Paola Cassetta	Cardinal-Bishop of Sabina–Poggio Mirteto; 1911—1928	Succeeded by Donato Sbarretti
