= Lorenzo Perosi =

Italian composer

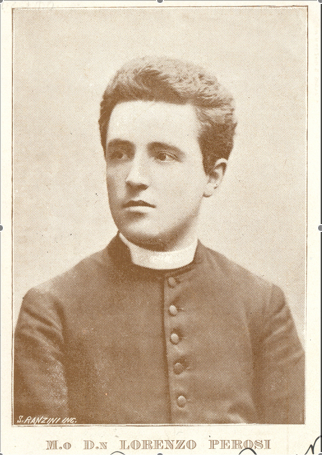
Don Perosi (c. 1900).

Monsignor Lorenzo Perosi (21 December 1872 – 12 October 1956) was an Italian composer of sacred music and the only member of the Giovane Scuola who did not write opera. In the late 1890s, while he was still only in his twenties, Perosi was an internationally celebrated composer of sacred music, especially large-scale oratorios. Nobel Prize winner Romain Rolland wrote, "It's not easy to give you an exact idea of how popular Lorenzo Perosi is in his native country." Perosi's fame was not restricted to Europe. A 19 March 1899 New York Times article entitled "The Genius of Don Perosi" began, "The great and ever-increasing success which has greeted the four new oratorios of Don Lorenzo Perosi has placed this young priest-composer on a pedestal of fame which can only be compared with that which has been accorded of late years to the idolized Pietro Mascagni by his fellow-countrymen." Gianandrea Gavazzeni made the same comparison: "The sudden clamors of applause, at the end of the [19th] century, were just like those a decade earlier for Mascagni." Perosi worked for five Popes, including Pope Pius X who greatly fostered his rise.

== Biography ==
=== Early years and education ===
Lorenzo Perosi was born at Tortona, Piedmont, in Italy. Many sources give December 20 as Perosi's birthdate but recent scholarship suggests December 21 to be correct. Perosi was one of twelve children, one of six to survive infancy. Perosi hailed from an extremely musical and religious family. For nearly 200 years before him, all of Lorenzo's ancestors were church musicians. His father was Giuseppe Perosi (1849–1908), Maestro di Cappella (Choir Director) of Tortona Cathedral and one of Italy's most prominent church musicians. Giuseppe was the first teacher of Lorenzo as well as his other two sons, Carlo (who became a priest and then a cardinal) and Marziano (who was Maestro di Cappella at the Duomo of Milan from 1930 to 1949). In Milan Lorenzo studied with respected professor Michele Saladino of the Milan Conservatory. Even when he was not enrolled at the Conservatory, Perosi kept up a correspondence course with Saladino.

In 1890, 18 years old and still a student, Perosi obtained his first professional post: organist and "teacher of the piano novices" at the Abbey of Montecassino. He received his diploma from the Milan Conservatory in 1892, following which he spent an influential year of study with Franz Xaver Haberl in Regensburg, at the Kirchenmusikschule that Haberl had founded in 1874. A noted musician and musicologist, Haberl was the pioneering editor of the complete works of Palestrina and Lassus. Perosi's development was such that Haberl offered him a cattedra ("chair," or permanent teaching position) in the Kirchenmusikschule. The homesick Perosi politely declined, in favour of a post as teacher and director of sacred music at Imola. As Perosi himself explained, he "desired and prayed at length to the Lord to be able to do something for the music of God in Italy." Perosi served in Imola from November 1892, to August 1894.

In 1894 Perosi went to Solesmes Abbey to study with the Gregorianists Dom André Mocquereau and Dom Joseph Pothier. The Renaissance polyphony he learned from Haberl, and the Gregorian chant he studied in Solesmes were the two pillars upon which the entire oeuvre of Perosi rested.

=== Years in Venice ===
From Imola, Perosi obtained a more important post, that of Maestro of the Cappella Marciana at San Marco's Basilica in Venice. This Venetian appointment resulted from the deep friendship between Perosi and Cardinal Giuseppe Sarto, then Patriarca di Venezia (Patriarch of Venice) but soon to be Pope Pius X. Sarto was a profound music-lover who was disturbed by the roughly hundred years (c.1800–1900) that Gregorian Chant was absent from the Church. A more operatic, entertaining style of music prevailed. Thus, Perosi found in Sarto not only a friend and kindred spirit, but also a staunch sponsor.

Perosi's Venetian appointment (1894) unleashed a torrent of music that lasted at least until 1907. He continued to compose prolifically until his death, but this 13-year period produced some of his most substantial work.

In 1895, Perosi became a priest, having been ordained by his good friend Cardinal Patriarch Sarto himself. Sarto and Perosi were friends with Luigi Orione, who was born in Tortona in 1872 like Perosi, and the three were also mutual inspirers.

Don Perosi was inspired by the later Pope Pius X also to infuse priestly sanctity into the music, and Perosi daily offered Mass and spent many hours in prayer.

=== Vatican appointment ===
Perosi and Toscanini, in Milan for the world première of Mosè (1901).

In 1898, Cardinal Sarto used his influence with Pope Leo XIII to get Perosi the post of Maestro Perpetuo della Cappella Sistina, or Perpetual Director of the Sistine Choir, in Rome. Five years later, Sarto was elected Pope Pius X. Just months after his coronation, he released a Motu Proprio Tra le sollecitudini on sacred music. It gave Gregorian Chant a privileged status as the ideal form of liturgical music, banned women vocalists, severely restricted the use of any instrument but the organ, and prohibited the adaptation of secular music for church use.

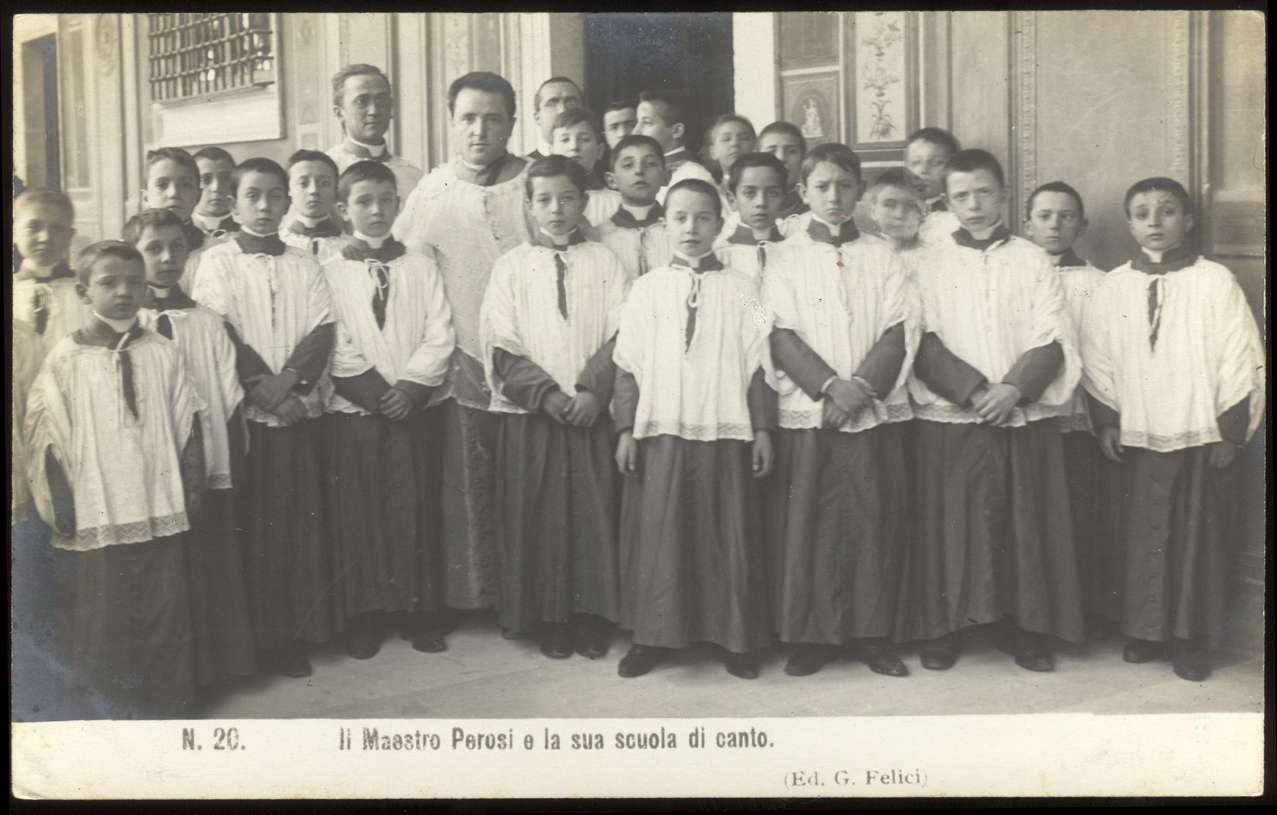
Don Perosi with his scuola di canto (singschool, c. 1905).

Perosi remained Maestro Perpetuo until his death over 50 years later, in spite of interruptions in his directorship. After 1907, Perosi began to suffer more intensely from psychological and neurological problems, caused by his problematic (probably breech-) birth. These afflictions reached their apex in 1922; many declared him "incurable." The composer did spend many months in comparative seclusion; some sources suggest he was briefly institutionalized, although recent scholarship suggests that this was not the case, and that he did not change residence in 1922. In fact, the very next year, 1923, Perosi had fully resumed his administrative and compositional activity; in the last decade of his life, he also maintained a busy conducting schedule.

== Compositions ==
According to biographer Graziella Merlatti, Perosi was the most prolific composer of sacred music of the 20th century. According to musicologist Arturo Sacchetti's estimate, Perosi composed 3,000–4,000 works. A great many still await publication; some have not yet been located. All of the sources mentioned in the bibliography agree that Perosi was the most influential composer of the Cecilian Movement.

Despite the relative obscurity of his name today, Perosi was a prominent member of the Giovane Scuola, of which the most important Verismo composers or Veristi (Puccini, Mascagni, Leoncavallo, Giordano, and Cilea) were all considered members. An entire chapter is dedicated to Perosi in Romain Rolland's Musiciens d’Aujourd’hui (1899). Perosi was deeply admired not only by Rolland and by the above-named Veristi, but also by Boito, Toscanini, and many others. Caruso sang his music, as did Sammarco, Tagliabue, Gigli, and other great singers from that era, and also quite a few in modern times, such as Fiorenza Cossotto, Mirella Freni, Renato Capecchi, and fellow Tortonese Giuseppe Campora. His French admirers included Debussy, Massenet, Guilmant and d'Indy, all of whom were impressed by the 1899 French Première of La Risurrezione di Cristo. Unlike the other members of the Giovane Scuola, Perosi was significantly influenced by pre-Classical repertoire. Romain Rolland reports that Perosi said, "Great artists formerly were more eclectic than ourselves, and less fettered by their nationalities. ...We must do as they did. We must try to recreate an art in which the arts of all countries and all times are blended."

In his day, Perosi was best known for his oratorios, large-scale works for chorus, soloists, and orchestra based on Latin texts. While the works can seem slow-paced today, at the time they were quite novel not only for their fusion of Renaissance polyphony, Gregorian chant, and lush, Verismo melodies and orchestrations, but also for Perosi's deep-seated faith in the words that he had set. The oratorio as a genre had been in decline in the preceding centuries, and Perosi's contributions to the canon brought him brief but significant international acclaim.

In addition to the oratorios and masses for which he is best known, Perosi also wrote secular music—symphonic poems, chamber music, concertos, etc. In his youth, he also wrote pieces for organ.

Giacomo Puccini is quoted as saying that "There's more music in Perosi's head than in mine and Mascagni's put together."

== List of major works ==
=== Oratorios ===
- La Passione di Cristo secondo S. Marco (1897)
- La Trasfigurazione di Cristo (1898)
- La Risurrezione di Lazzaro (1898)
- La Risurrezione di Cristo (1898)
- Il Natale del Redentore (1899)
- La Strage degli Innocenti (1900)
- Il Giudizio Universale (1904)
- Transitus Animae (1907)

=== Masses and mottetti ===
- Missa In Honorem Ss. Gervasii et Protasii (1895)
- Missa In Honorem Beati Ambrosii (1895)
- Missa "Te Deum Laudamus" (1897)
- Missa Eucharistica (1897)
- Missa [Prima] Pontificalis (1897)
- Messa da Requiem (1897)
- Missa a Tre Voci Maschili (Missa Cerviana) (1898)
- Missa "Benedicamus Domino" (1899)
- Missa Secunda Pontificalis (1906)
- Melodie Sacre (eight volumes) (1897–1904)

== Perosi's successor ==
Perosi was succeeded as director of the Sistine Choir and Papal musician by his assistant, monsignor Domenico Bartolucci (born Borgo San Lorenzo, May 7, 1917 - 11 November 2013) in 1956, who remained at this post until 1997. Bartolucci, who was rehabilitated in 2006 under Pope Benedict XVI, was harshly critical of Perosi, whom he blamed for the deterioration of Church music.

== Sources ==
Biographies

- Amadori, Andrea (1999). Lorenzo Perosi: Documenti e inediti. ISBN 88-7096-233-4.
- Bassi, Adriano (1994). Don Lorenzo Perosi: L'uomo, il compositore e il religioso. Schena. ISBN 88-7514-708-6.
- Bruni, Massimo (1972). Lorenzo Perosi.
- Ciampa, Leonardo (2006). Don Lorenzo Perosi. AuthorHouse. ISBN 1-4259-3440-4.
- Damerini, Adelmo (1953). Lorenzo Perosi.
- Glinski, Matteo (1953). Lorenzo Perosi.
- Hesse, Helmut (1981). Lorenzo Perosi. Sein Leben und seine Musik. Vol. Heft 5. Musica Sacra. pp. 343–349.
- Merlatti, Graziella (2006). Lorenzo Perosi, una vita tra genio e follia. Àncora. ISBN 88-514-0330-9.
- Onofri, Teodoro (1977). Lorenzo Perosi nei giorni imolesi.
- Pagano, Sergio (1996). L'epistolario "vaticano" di Lorenzo Perosi (1867-1956). Marietti. ISBN 88-211-9120-6.
- Paglialunga, Arcangelo (1952). Lorenzo Perosi.
- Rinaldi, Mario (1967). Lorenzo Perosi. Rome.
- Sanarica, Marino (1999). Lorenzo Perosi: coscienza e tradizione in un'anima musicale. Rimini. ISBN 88-8049-161-X.
