= Gian Paolo Lomazzo =

Italian artist and writer (1538–1592)

Giovanni Paolo Lomazzo
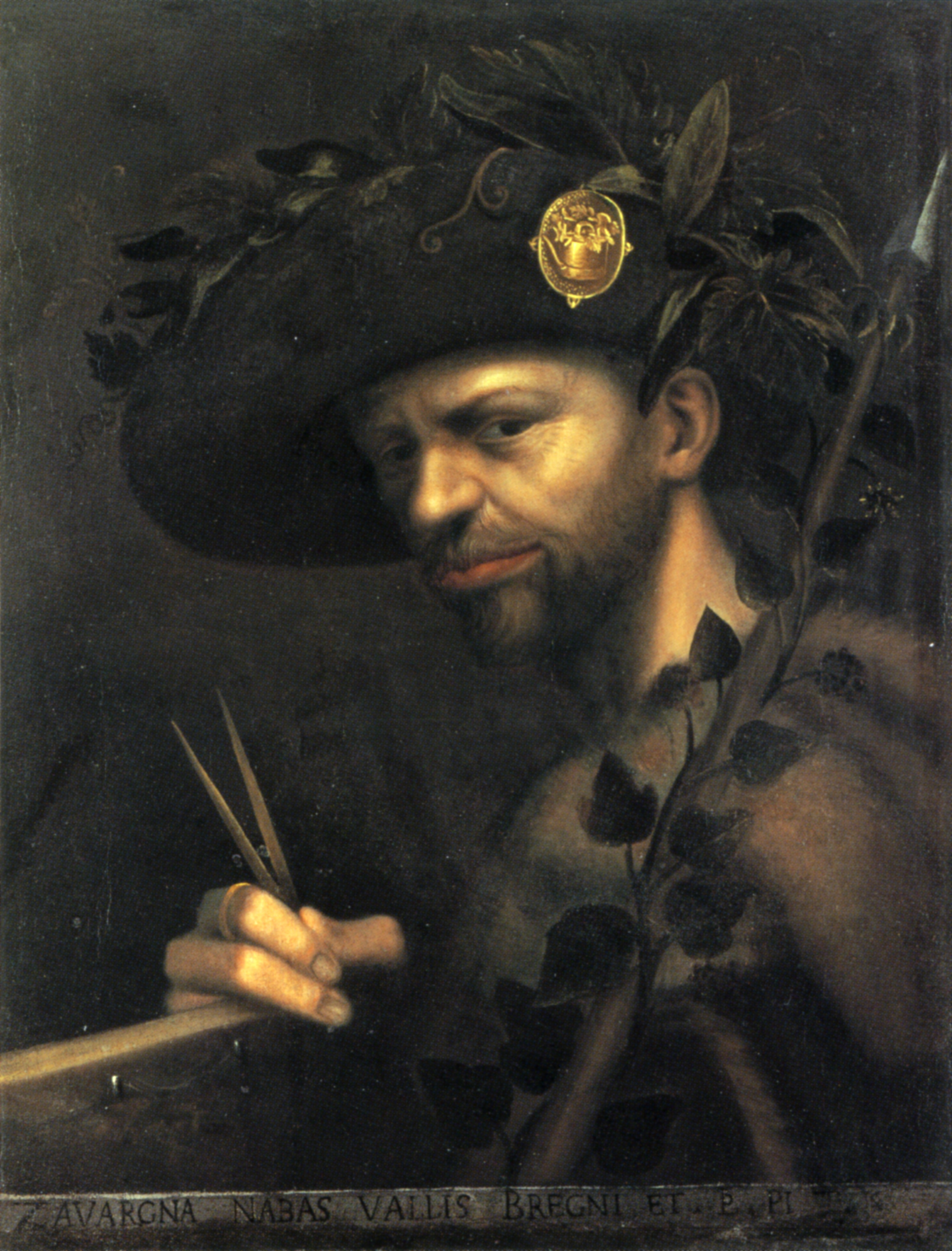
- Self-portrait
- Born: 26 April 1538; Milan, Duchy of Milan
- Died: 27 January 1592 (aged 53); Milan, Duchy of Milan
- Known for: Painting, art criticism
- Movement: Italian Renaissance; Mannerism

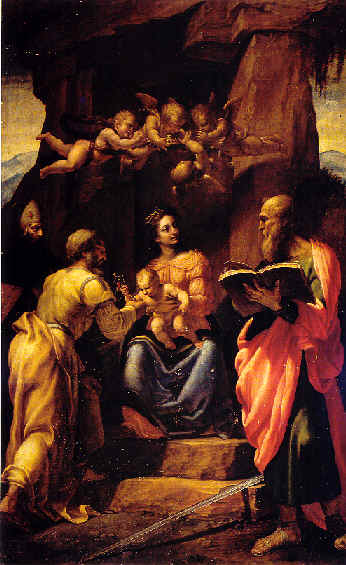
Madonna and Saints, Church of San Marco, Milan

Gian Paolo Lomazzo (Note: His first name is sometimes also given as "Giovan" or "Giovanni".) (26 April 1538 – 27 January 1592) was an Italian artist and writer on art. Praised as a painter, Lomazzo wrote about artistic practice and art theory after blindness compelled him to pursue a different professional path by 1571. Lomazzo's written works were especially influential to second generation Mannerism in Italian art and architecture.

== Early life ==
Born to a family of some social status, Lomazzo appears to have received a better education than most painters. Early indications of his artistic abilities led to his studying with the little-known Giovanni Battista della Cerva, an assistant of Gaudenzio Ferrari (whom Lomazzo appears to have regarded as his real master).

Lomazzo’s autobiography, published with his Rime in 1587, indicates that he received a steady stream of commissions for murals and altarpieces, once he became an independent master. His many connections, among whom was Giuliano Gosellini (1525–1587), secretary to successive governors of Milan and a poet of some note, helped to ensure that he was also asked to supply numerous portraits of friends and aristocratic patrons.

He moved within literary circles in Milan and became closely involved in a burlesque academy of letters, the Accademiglia dra Vall d’Bregn. Founded in 1560, the academy was dedicated to a contrived dialect, which purported to be the ancient language of Swiss wine porters working in Lombardy. The 160 members of the academy were devoted both to social pleasures and to the promotion of a body of serio-comic literature in their deliberately arcane dialect.

In 1562 his frescoed copy of Leonardo’s Last Supper made for the refectory of the convent of Santa Maria della Pace, Milan, met with a hostile reception, and Lomazzo left Milan to travel within Italy and perhaps to Flanders, avidly observing a wide range of art. The formative influences on Lomazzo’s style were the painters whose works he had seen in Milan, including, besides Leonardo, the Lombard Mannerists such as Aurelio Luini and Gaudenzio Ferrari, and the Bolognese Pellegrino Tibaldi. In these travels he developed a profound admiration for the draughtsmanship of Raphael and Michelangelo (whose ‘serpentine’ figure style he especially praised), while looking towards the Venetian masters for the handling of colour. By his own testimony he was also affected by the inventiveness of Albrecht Dürer, whom he called "the great Druid". The resulting eclecticism of his style is typical of academic Mannerism in North Italy in the later part of the 16th century.

On his return to Milan in 1565, he undertook many religious and secular works, most of which have been lost or destroyed or remain unidentified. His major surviving cycle of religious paintings (1565) is in the Capella Foppa in San Marco in Milan. The relatively sober altarpiece of the Virgin and Saints Peter, Paul and Augustine is dated 1571. The cupola is decorated with grandiloquent images of the Prophets and Sibyls, and the apsidal semi-dome with a tumultuous vision of the angelic Paradise. The narratives on the walls depict the Conversion of Saul (almost obliterated) and the Fall of Simon Magus, who plunges headlong into the space of the mural in abrupt perspective. In his figure style Lomazzo strove to combine monumentality and complexity, exploiting rhetorical gestures to convey meaning. The vault figures are strongly foreshortened, and a preparatory drawing (Princeton U., NJ, A. Mus.) shows that he used the quadratura technique of schematizing the figure into a series of box-like components to facilitate the placing of limbs in perspective.

In 1568 Lomazzo became ‘Abbot’ or ‘Nabad’ of the Accademiglia, and a collection of his own literary compositions was published in 1589 as Rabisch dra Accademiglia dor compà Zavargna, Nabad dra Vall d’Bregn. It is in this role that Lomazzo (or ‘Zavargna’, to give him his dialect name) appears in his Self-portrait as Abbot of the Accademiglia (1568; Milan, Brera). This iconographically complex work, painted in a chiaroscuro style that owes as much to Giorgione or Dosso Dossi as to Leonardo or his fellow Milanese artists, is his masterpiece as a painter of secular subjects. The image makes clear allusions to Bacchus as protector of the ‘academy’ and is loaded with other symbolic references. For instance, the robe signifies the weighty problems of his office, while the straw hat evokes humility. The compasses obviously refer to his insistence on mathematical precision, but, in conjunction with his riveting stare, may also allude to the Michelangelesque dictum that the painter should possess compasses in his eyes rather than his hands.

Lomazzo’s dated pictures include: a massive Quadragesimal Supper (‘Lenten Supper’; 1567; Piacenza, Sant'Agostino; destr. but known through photographs and preparatory drawings in Windsor Castle, Royal Lib., and Oxford, Christ Church); a Madonna di San Michele (1570; Busto Arsizio, Santa Maria di Piazza) for San Romano, Lodi, and a Crucifixion with the Virgin, St John and Mary Magdalene (1571; Milan, Brera, on dep. Milan, Semin. Vescovile) for San Giovanni in Conca, Milan.

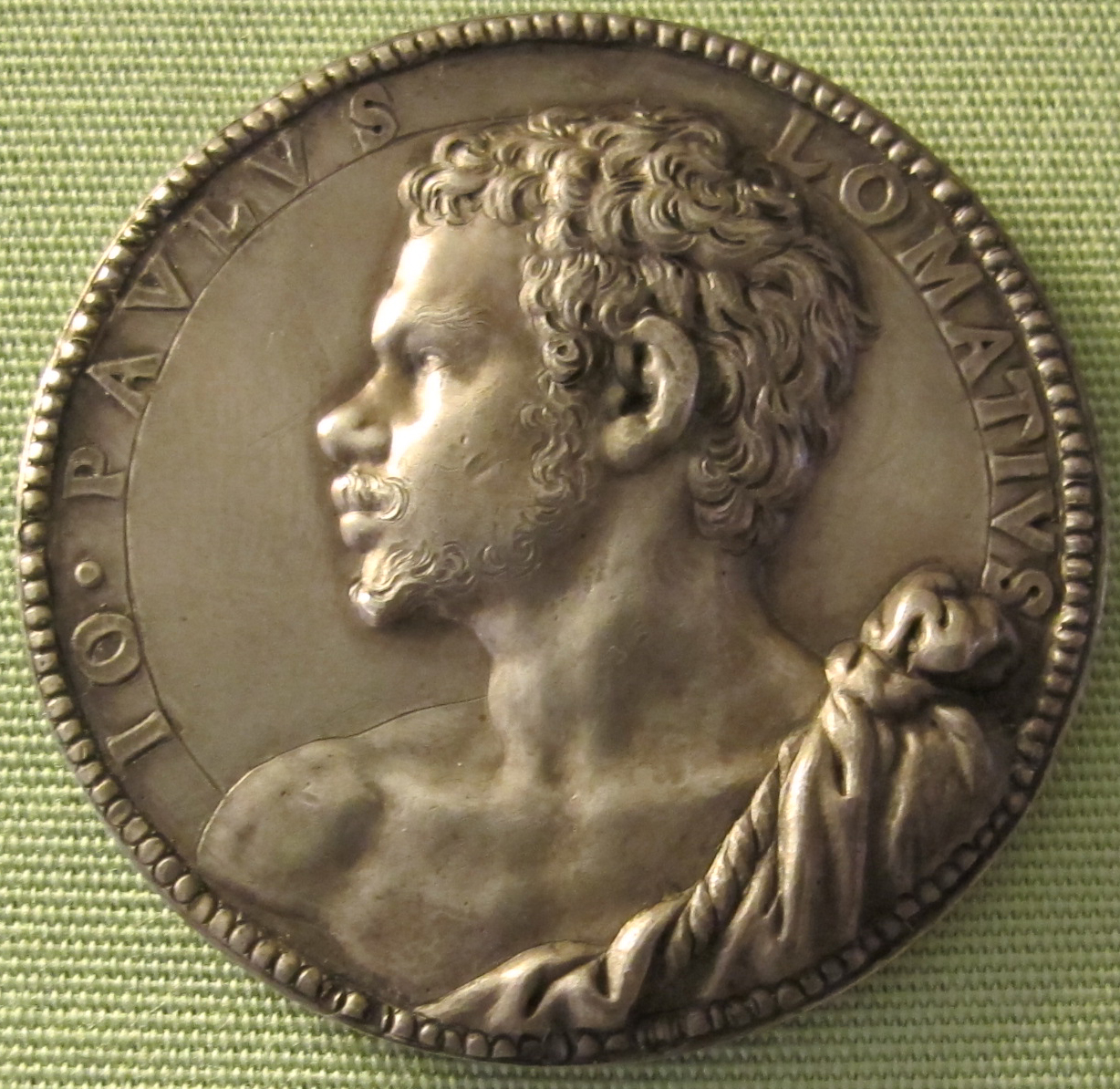
Lomazzo depicted on a medal by Annibale Fontana

His burgeoning career as a painter was cut short from 1571 by the progressive loss of his sight, and he subsequently devoted himself to his writings in art theory and other literary genres. His work as a painter has not been fully studied, and most of his activity as a portrait painter remains obscure. His leading pupil was Giovanni Ambrogio Figino, who shared his academic instincts. Lomazzo was depicted on a ca. 1560 medal by Annibale Fontana which described him as having been introduced by Mercury to Fortune (commercial success).

== Writings on art theory and criticism ==
Lomazzo wrote two complex treatises that are milestones in the development of art criticism. His first work, Trattato dell'arte della pittura, scoltura et architettura (1584), is divided into seven books: Proportion, Motion, Color, Light, Perspective, Practice, History, and iconography related to classical and Christian subjects. Lomazzo’s offering of a systematic codification of aesthetics was central to the development of Italian mannerist theories of art. Lomazzo's first treatise was translated into English by British physician Richard Haydocke and published in 1596 as A Tracte Containing the Artes of Curious Paintinge, Carvinge & Buildinge (1596), which included new details about British artists.

Lomazzo's more abstract Idea del tempio della pittura ("The ideal temple of painting", 1590) describes the "four temperaments" theory of human nature and personality and contains explanations about of the role of individuality in judgment and artistic invention.

Lomazzo's writings about art took into account three aspects of art criticism: doctrina, the record of discoveries—such as perspective—that artists had made in the course of history; prattica, the personal preferences and maniera of the artist, and iconography, the literary element in arts. Lomazzo's contribution to art criticism was his systematic extraction of abstract concepts from art, not merely a recounting of the marvels of verisimilitude and technique and anecdotes of the works' reception among contemporaries of the type that Giorgio Vasari had reported in the previous generation.

David Piper quotes his influential views on portraiture:

Emperors above all other Kings and Princes should be endowed with majesty, and have a noble and grave air which conforms to their station in life ... even though they be not so naturally in life.

== See also ==
- Art of the late 16th century in Milan
