= Tortona Cathedral =

Cathedral in Tortona, Italy

Coordinates: 44.8976°N 8.865°E

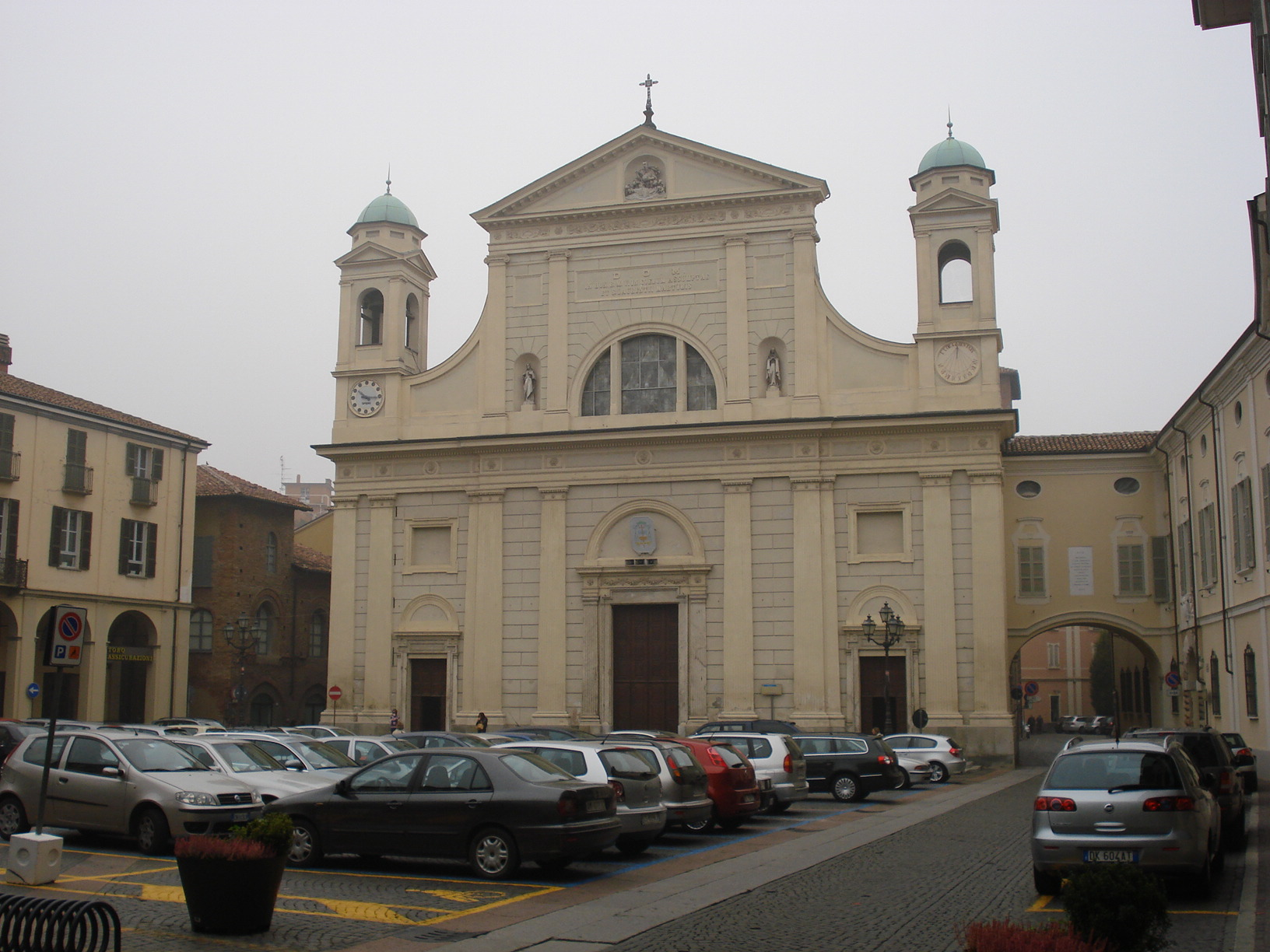
Tortona Cathedral

Tortona Cathedral (Italian: Duomo di Tortona; Cattedrale di Santa Maria Assunta e San Lorenzo) is a Catholic cathedral in Tortona, Piedmont, in northwest Italy, dedicated to the Assumption of the Virgin Mary and Saint Lawrence. It is the episcopal seat of the Diocese of Tortona.
