= San Fedele, Milan =

Church in Milan, Italy

Coordinates: 45°28′00″N 9°11′29″E

Church of Saint Fidelis (Chiesa di San Fedele)
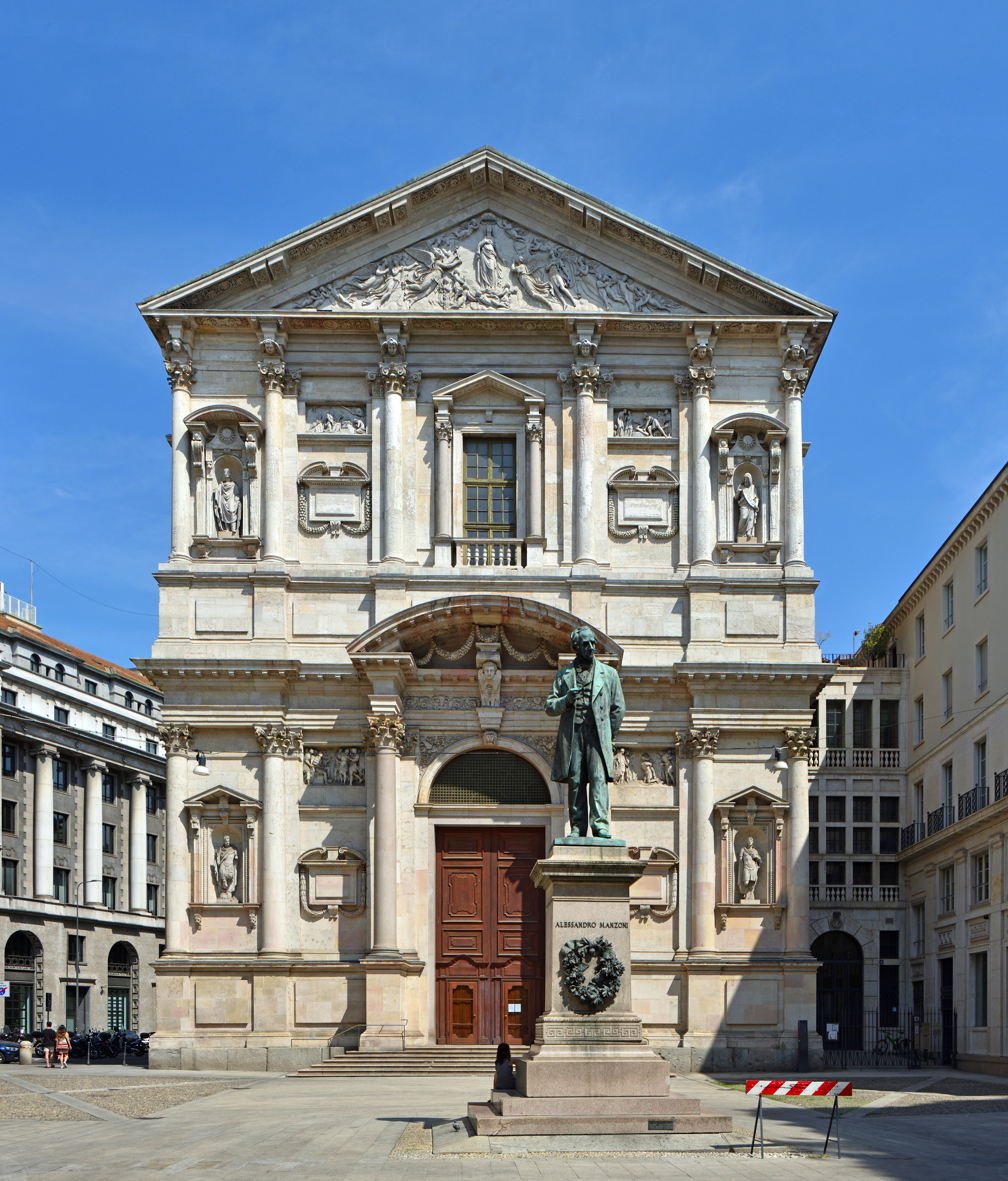
- Façade of the church

Religion
- Affiliation: Roman Catholic
- Province: Milan
- Status: Active

Location
- Location: Milan, Italy
- Interactive map of Church of Saint Fidelis (Chiesa di San Fedele)

Architecture
- Architect: Pellegrino Tibaldi
- Type: Church
- Style: Mannerism

San Fedele is a Jesuit church in Milan, northern Italy. It is dedicated to St. Fidelis of Como, patron of the Catholic diocese of Como. Presently it remains a parish church, owned by the Jesuit order, though focusing on religious works.

== History ==
Located in Saint Fedele Square in the centre of the city, near the Palazzo Marino, the Teatro alla Scala and the Galleria Vittorio Emanuele II, the church was commissioned by Charles Borromeo from Pellegrino Tibaldi (1559). Outside of the church, in Piazza San Fedele, is a bronze statue (1883) in memory of the writer Alessandro Manzoni, who lived nearby, and who died from a head injury he received after a fall while exiting mass at San Fedele on 6 January 1873.

The interior is on a single nave, with tall columns in granite. The presbytery was extended in the 17th century by Francesco Maria Richino, who also designed the sacristy. The façade was completed by Pietro Pestagalli from Tibaldi's designs in 1835. It features a group of Gaetano Matteo Monti's statues representing the Assumption.

The interior is decorated with artworks that include a Pietà by Simone Peterzano, a St. Ignatius by Giovanni Battista Crespi (il Cerano) a Transfiguration by Bernardino Campi, and a Sacred Heart by Lucio Fontana. A Madonna of the Snake by Ambrogio Figino, once found in the church, is now in the church of Sant'Antonio Abate of the city.

== Museo San Fedele ==
The museum and gallery was inaugurated in December 2014. It displays works that are part of the collection of the Jesuit order. The Jesuit priest, Arcangelo Favaro, founder of the Galleria San Fedele, was prompted by the speech given by Pope Paul VI in 1964 urging a dialogue between art and faith. Among the works in the gallery are modern contributions by Carlo Carrà, Mario Sironi, and Lucio Fontana. Fontana's commissioned altarpiece Il Sacro Cuore (1956) is now in the church. Other works by David Simpson, Mimmo Paladino, Jannis Kounellis, Sean Shanahan, Claudio Parmiggiani, and Nicola De Maria are in the gallery or church.

== See also ==
- 16th-century Western domes
- List of Jesuit sites
