= Centro Diaz =

Skyscraper in Milan, Italy

- Centro Diaz in Milan, 2021
- Interactive map of the Centro Diaz area

General information
- Status: Completed
- Location: Milan, Italy
- Coordinates: 45°27′43″N 9°11′24″E
- Construction started: 1953
- Completed: 1957

Height
- Roof: 65 m (213 ft)

Design and construction
- Architect: Luigi Mattioni

Centro Diaz is an International Style building situated in Piazza Diaz in Milan, Italy.

== History ==
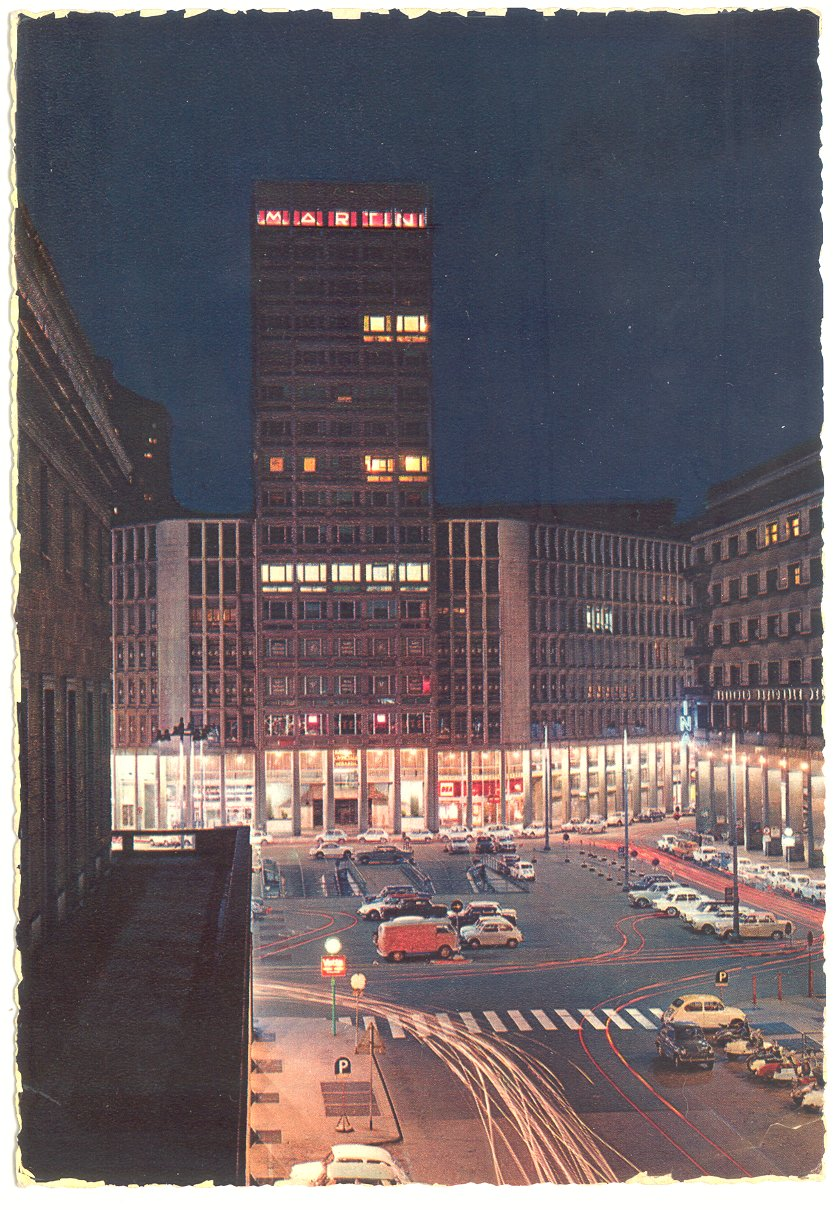
Centro Diaz at night in 1964

The construction of the building was first foreseen by the 1938 city plan concerning the completion of the southern side of the adjacent Piazza del Duomo. Several projects were suggested, the first of which consisted of a building with a compact shape. A tower was added to the plan by a 1951 project. This was meant to be aligned with the overlooking Galleria Vittorio Emanuele II, situated on the opposite side of the Piazza del Duomo. A private contest was finally organized in 1953, which was won by the Italian architect Luigi Mattioni, who later had to reduce the original height of the tower by 11 metres (36 ft) during the final review stages of the project. Construction was completed in 1957.

== Description ==
The tower of the building is 65 metres (213 ft) tall.
