= Piazza San Fedele =

Square in Milan, Italy

Coordinates: 45°27′59.27″N 9°11′28.07″E

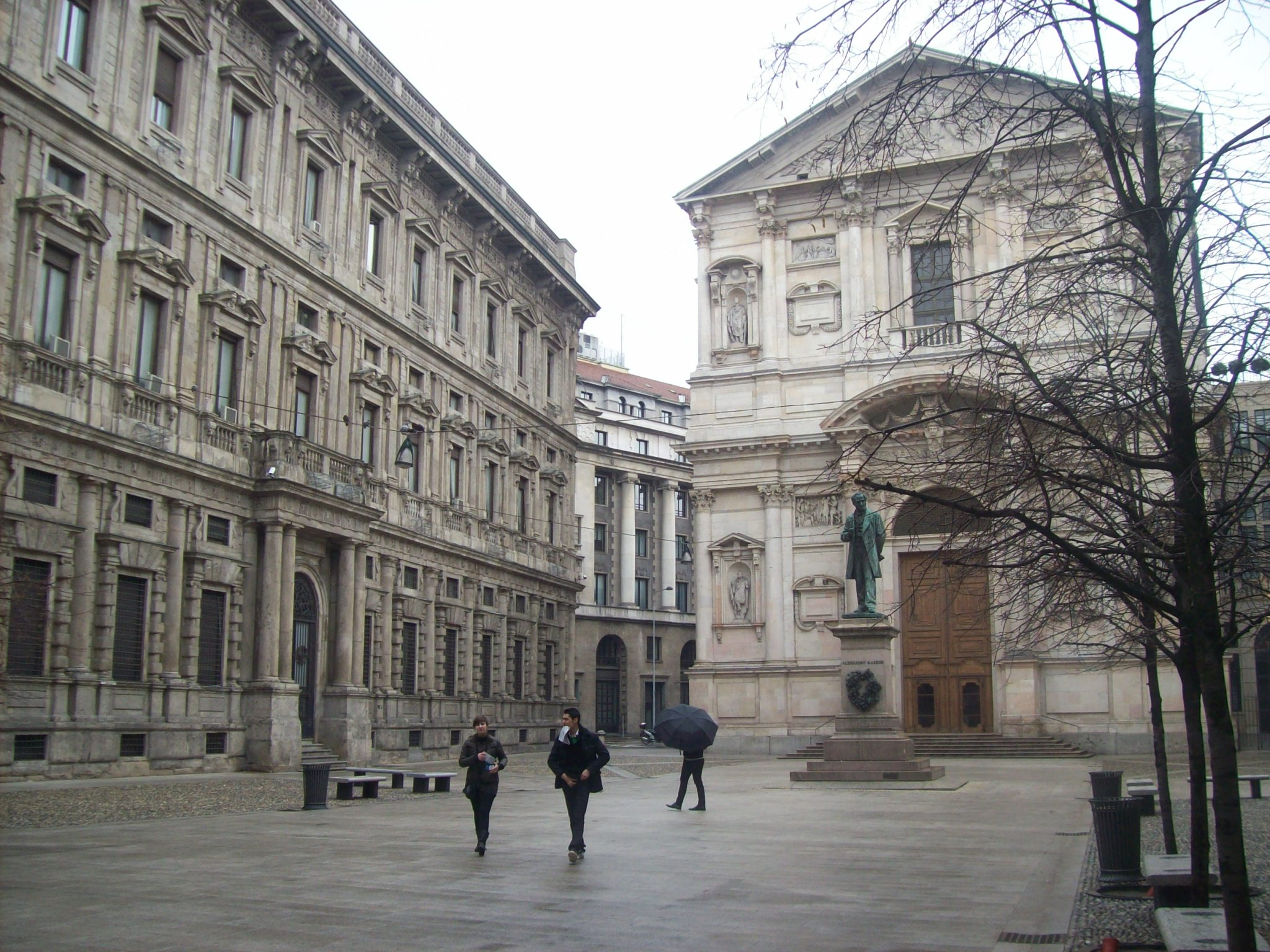
San Fedele Square with Palazzo Marino on the left and San Fedele Church on the back

Piazza San Fedele (Saint Fedele Square in English) is sited in Milan near Palazzo Marino (Milan's Municipal office), the Vittorio Emanuele II Gallery and Piazza della Scala in a pedestrian area in the centre of the city. The square is sited in front of at the homonymous San Fedele Church built based on an old project by Pellegrino Tibaldi in the 16th century and finally consecrated in the 18th century.

In the centre of square there is a bronze statue honoring the writer Alessandro Manzoni. The writer was born in the nearby Casa Manzoni in Belgiojoso square on 7 March 1785. On 6 January 1873, while exiting mass at the church of San Fedele, he fell on the steps. The head wound led to his demise on 22 May 1873. The statue was sculpted by Francesco Barzaghi and erected in 1883.

== Bibliography ==
- Milano e Provincia, Touring Club Italiano, ed.2003, Autori Vari. Italian
