= Town House Galleria =

Luxury hotel in Milan, Italy

Galleria Vik Milano Hotel
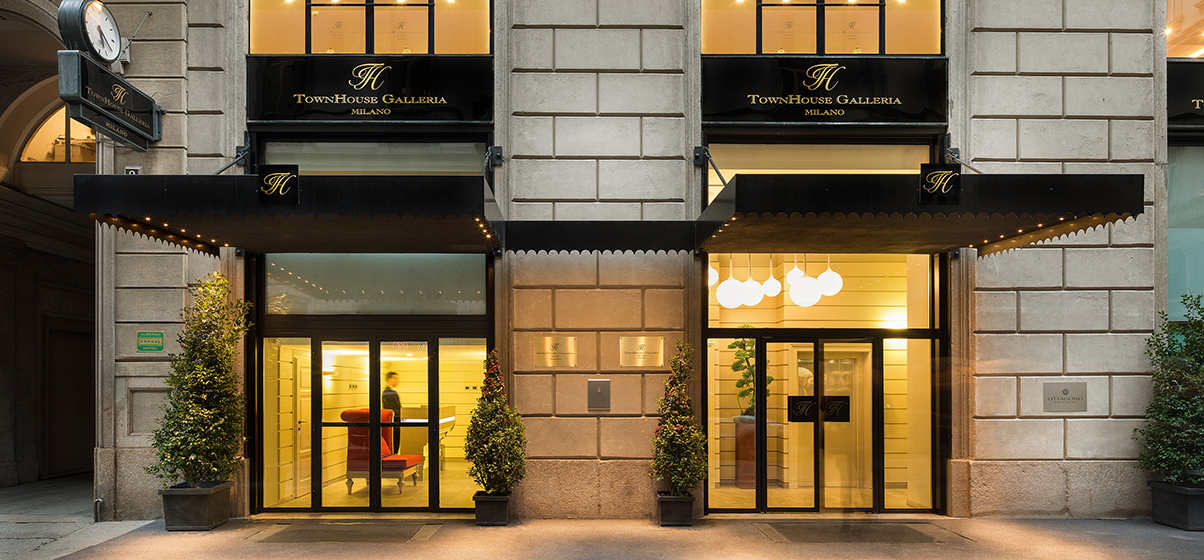
- TownHouse Galleria (now Galleria Vik) entrance
- Interactive map of the Galleria Vik Milano Hotel area
- Alternative names: TownHouse Galleria
- Hotel chain: Vik Retreats

General information
- Location: Milan, Italy, Via Silvio Pellico, 8 20121, Milano
- Construction started: 1865
- Completed: 1877
- Opened: 1877
- Inaugurated: 2019

Technical details
- Floor count: 5

Design and construction
- Architect: Giuseppe Mengoni
- Other designers: Carrie and Alex Vik

Renovating team
- Architect: Marcelo Daglio

Other information
- Number of rooms: 89

Website
- galleria.townhousehotels.com/

Galleria Vik Milano is a luxury hotel located in Milan, Italy. Situated inside the historic Galleria Vittorio Emanuele II, the hotel was rebranded as Galleria Vik in 2019 after its acquisition by the Vik Retreats group. The hotel is located in the heart of Milan within the Galleria Vittorio Emanuele II, a structure originally designed by Giuseppe Mengoni in 1861 and built between 1865 and 1877. Named after Italy's first king, Vittorio Emanuele II, the five-story building features two glass-vaulted arcades and a central dome that connects the Piazza del Duomo to the Piazza della Scala.

== History ==
Previously known as TownHouse Galleria, the hotel had claimed a seven-star rating certified by the Switzerland-based SGS rating and inspection company. However, SGS stated they did not know who had made the original designation. Formerly called the Seven Stars Galleria, the hotel gained attention in 2017 for offering 24-karat gold bedsheets in its Seven Stars Octagon Presidential Suite, with a set reportedly sold for $293,878, and the suite priced at €5,492.70 per night.

In 2019, the Vik Retreats group purchased the hotel along with the Seven Stars hotel in Milan for $18 million. The TownHouse Galleria was subsequently rebranded to Galleria Vik.
