= Giovanni Ambrogio Figino =

Italian painter (1548/1551–1608)

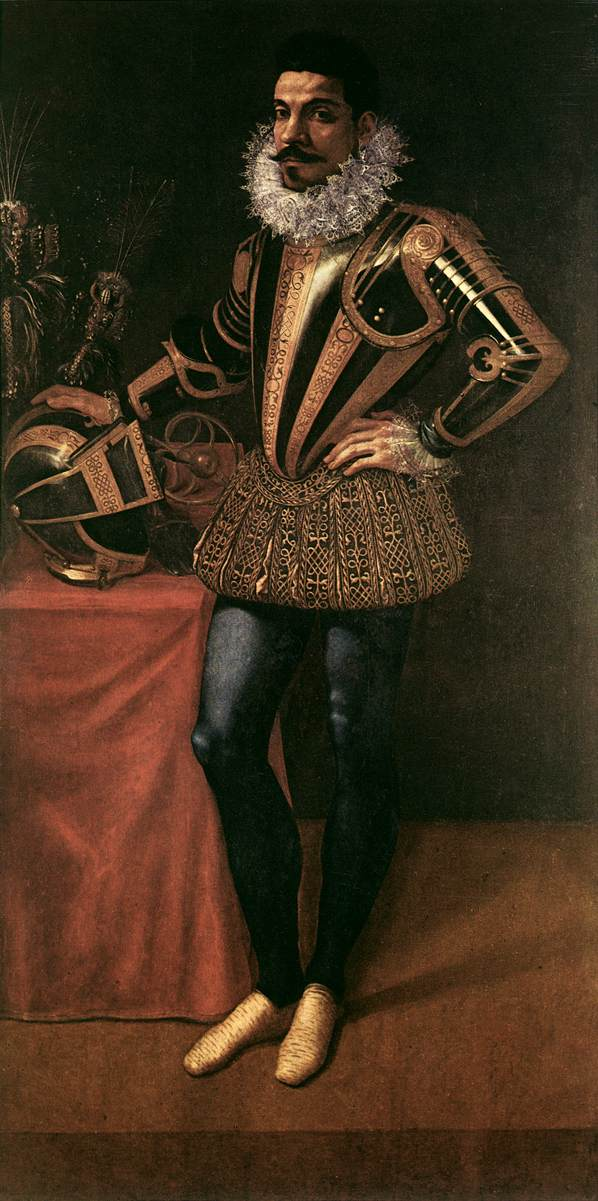
Portrait of Field Marshal Lucio Foppa, ca. 1590.

Giovanni Ambrogio Figino (1548/1551 – 11 October 1608) was an Italian Renaissance painter from Milan.

== Biography ==
A pupil of Gian Paolo Lomazzo, Figino became an important representative of the Lombard school of painting. Best known as a draftsman, he was also a skilled portrait painter. Among the few portraits that can be traced back to Figino, the portrait of Field Marshal Lucio Foppa is one of the best known.

On January 25, 2001, his Portrait of Giovanni Angelo was auctioned at Sotheby's for US$ $1,435,750; after a high estimate of US$180,000

The organ shutters for the Cathedral of Milan were painted after 1590 by Ambrogio, Camillo Procaccini, and Giuseppe Meda, depicting the Passage of the Red Sea and the Ascencion of Christ. In the Castello Sforcesco there is a painting of his of Saint Ambrose expelling the Arians. Also attributed to him is a painting of a dish of peaches, done at a time when still life was an uncommon genre in Italian art. He also painted in Milan an Immaculate conception for Sant'Antonio, and a Virgin with child, saints, and donors now at Brera Gallery.

== Works ==
The majority of Figino's works are drawings. These amount to over 430 known drawings. His known works include the following.

- ritratto di Angelo Dannona
- ritratto di S. Carlo, Milano, Pinacoteca Ambrosiana, ante 1584
- ritratto del Maresciallo di campo Lucio Foppa, Milano, Pinacoteca di Brera, 1585 c.
- Piatto metallico con pesche e foglie di vite, Olio su tavola, 21 x 29, 4 cm, Collezione privata
- Cristo e il fariseo, sagrestia del duomo di Monza
- Agonia nell'orto, Santa Maria della Passione, Milano
- Giove, Giunone e Io, Pavia Civic Museums, 1599
- Incoronazione della Vergine, Ss. Pietro, Paolo, Maria Maddalena e Marta, a cycle painted for San Fedele church, Milan
- Madonna del serpe, painted for San Fedele church, later moved to Sant'Antonio Abate church and since recently displayed at the basilica San Nazaro in Brolo, all in Milan
- S. Paolo e S. Matteo chiesa di San Raffaele, Milano
- Madonna col Bambino e i ss. Giovanni Evangelista e Michele Arcangelo, pala per la cappella del Collegio dei dottori di Milano, Pinacoteca di Brera
- S. Ambrogio che sconfigge gli ariani per la cappella del Collegio dei mercanti, Pinacoteca del Castello Sforzesco
- S. Giorgio, santuario dell'Addolorata di Rho
- Natività di Cristo, Passaggio degli Ebrei attraverso il mar Rosso, Ascensione (Perduta), ante d'organo del duomo di Milano, eseguite tra il 1590 e il 1595
- Natività di Maria, chiesa di Sant'Antonio Abate a Milano
- Incoronazione della Vergine, affresco Nella volta del presbiterio di San Vittore al Corpo
- Fatti della vita di s. Benedetto, Dio Padre, Angeli in volo, Putti alati e Angeli musici, ala sinistra del transetto di San Vittore al Corpo
- Cristo alla colonna, Museo civico di Busto Arsizio
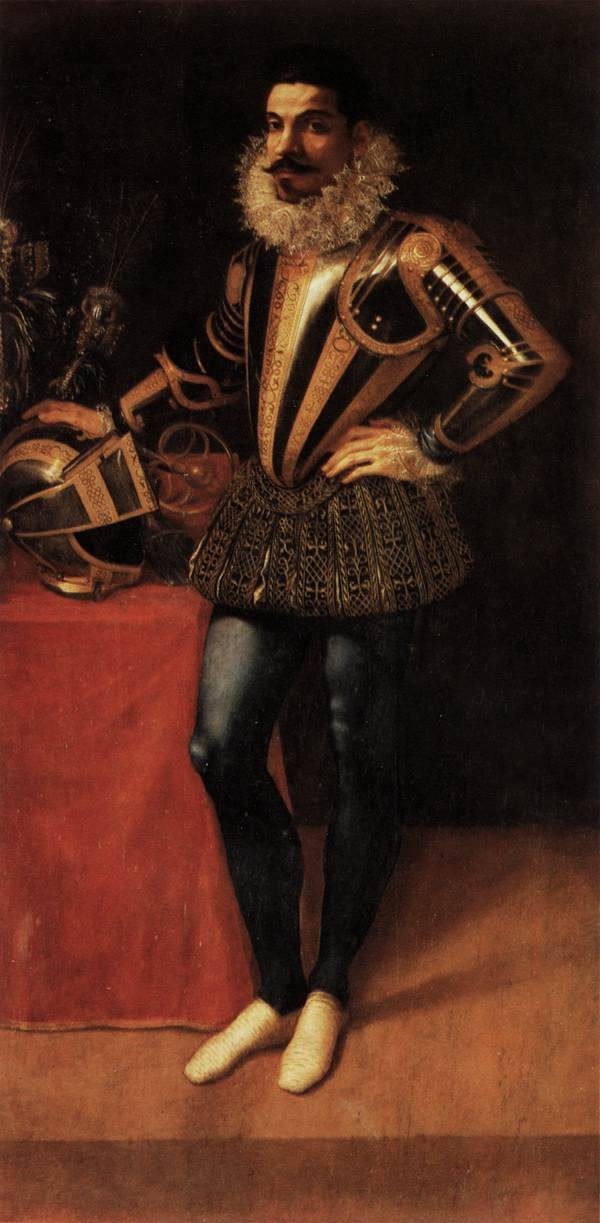
ritratto del Maresciallo di campo Lucio Foppa

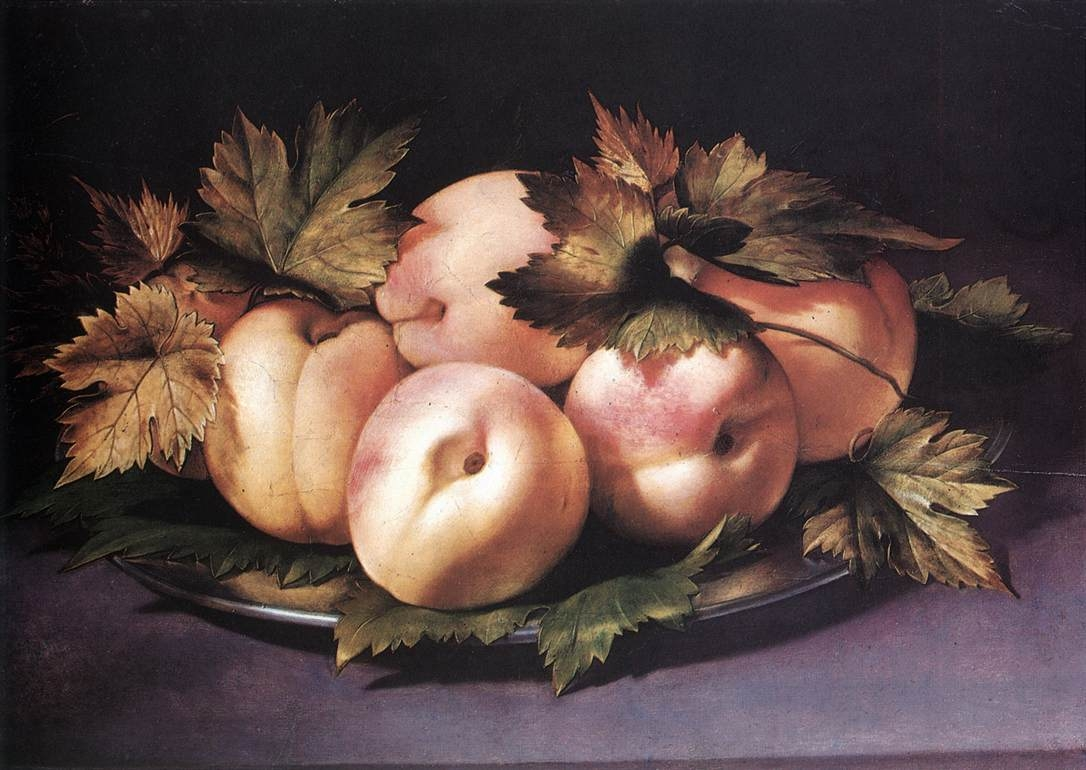
Piatto metallico con pesche e foglie di vite

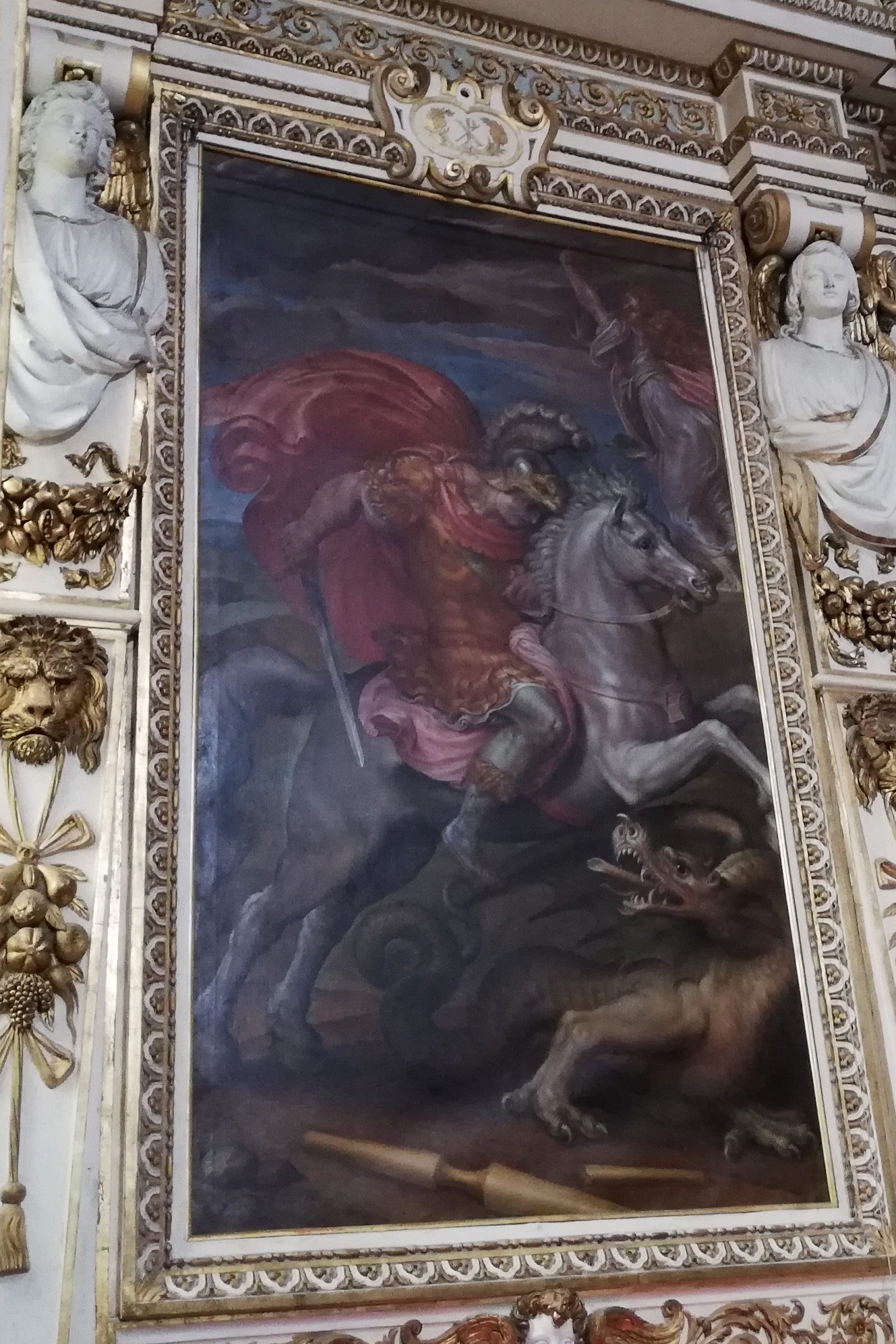
San Giorgio e il drago

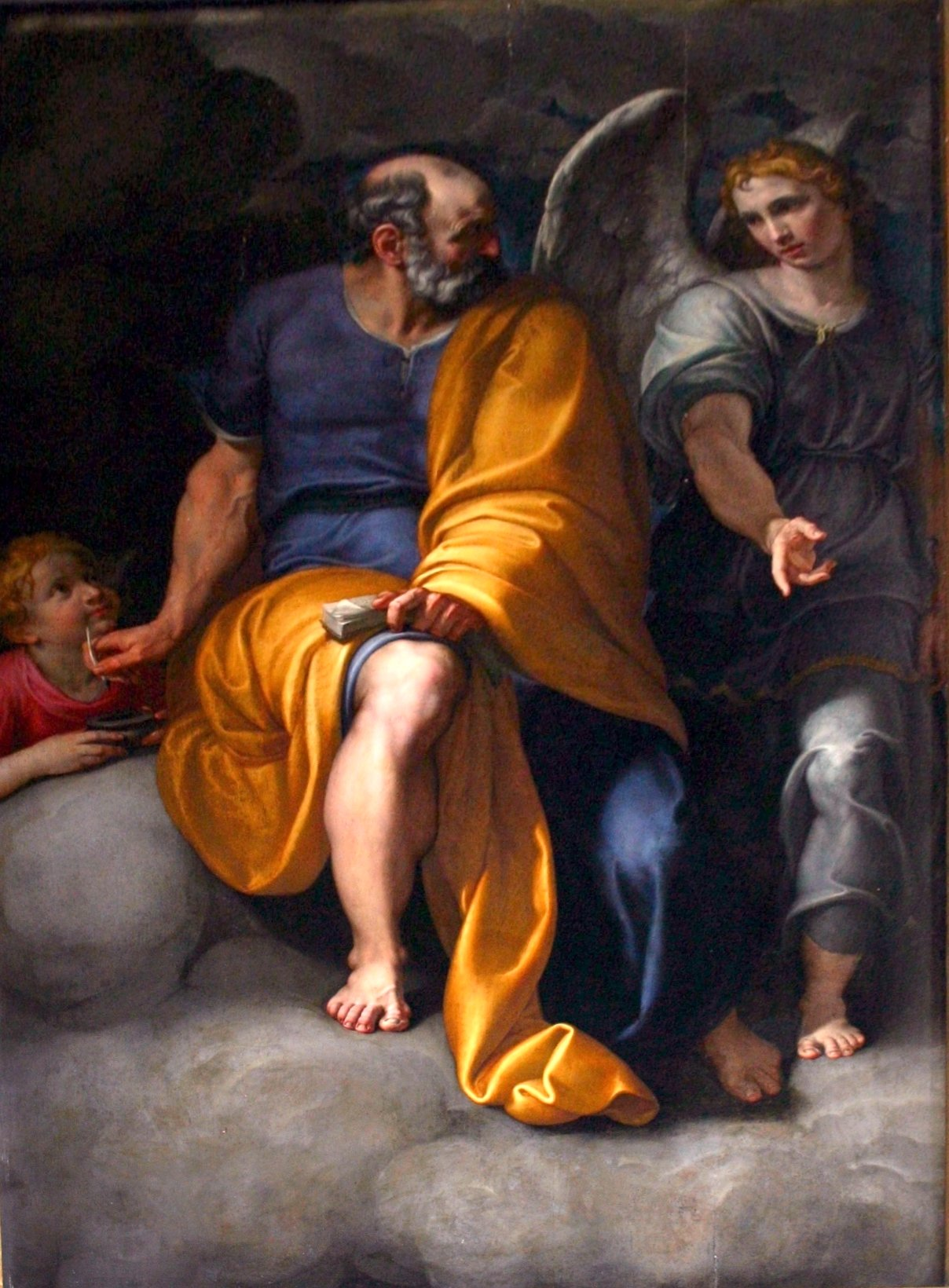
San Matteo

== See also ==
- Art of the late 16th century in Milan
