= Palazzo della Banca Commerciale Italiana =

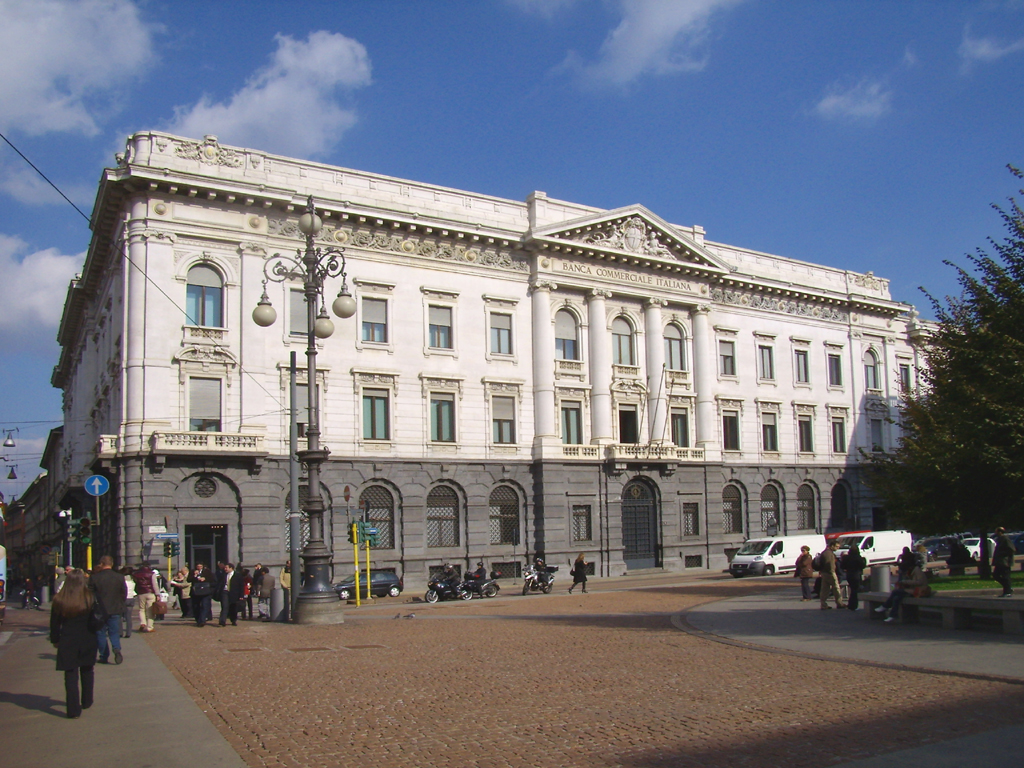
- The facade of the building

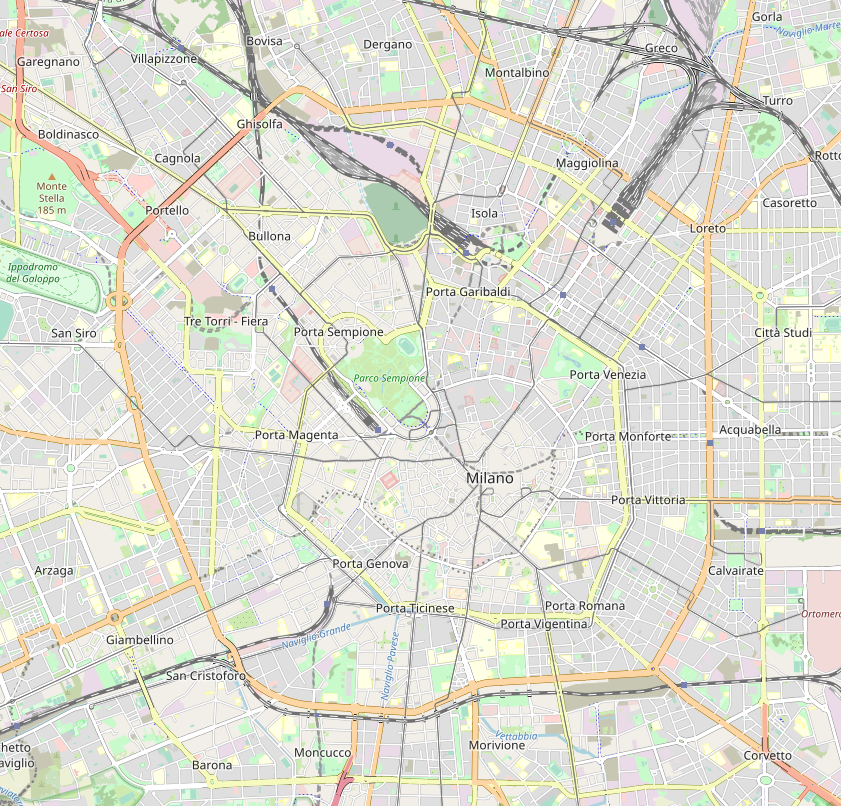
- Location within Milan Location within Italy

General information
- Location: Milan, Italy
- Coordinates: 45.4674°N 9.1906°E

Design and construction
- Architect: Luca Beltrami

The Palace of the Banca Commerciale Italiana (in Italian, Palazzo della Banca Commerciale Italiana) is a historic building of Milan, Italy, located in Piazza della Scala, in the city centre. It was designed by architect Luca Beltrami in the early 20th century for Banca Commerciale Italiana (BCI, an Italian bank), and it is still in use as a seat of the company (now merged into Banca Intesa). Since 2011 it hosts the Gallerie di Piazza Scala where are exposed many artworks from the collections of Fondazione Cariplo.

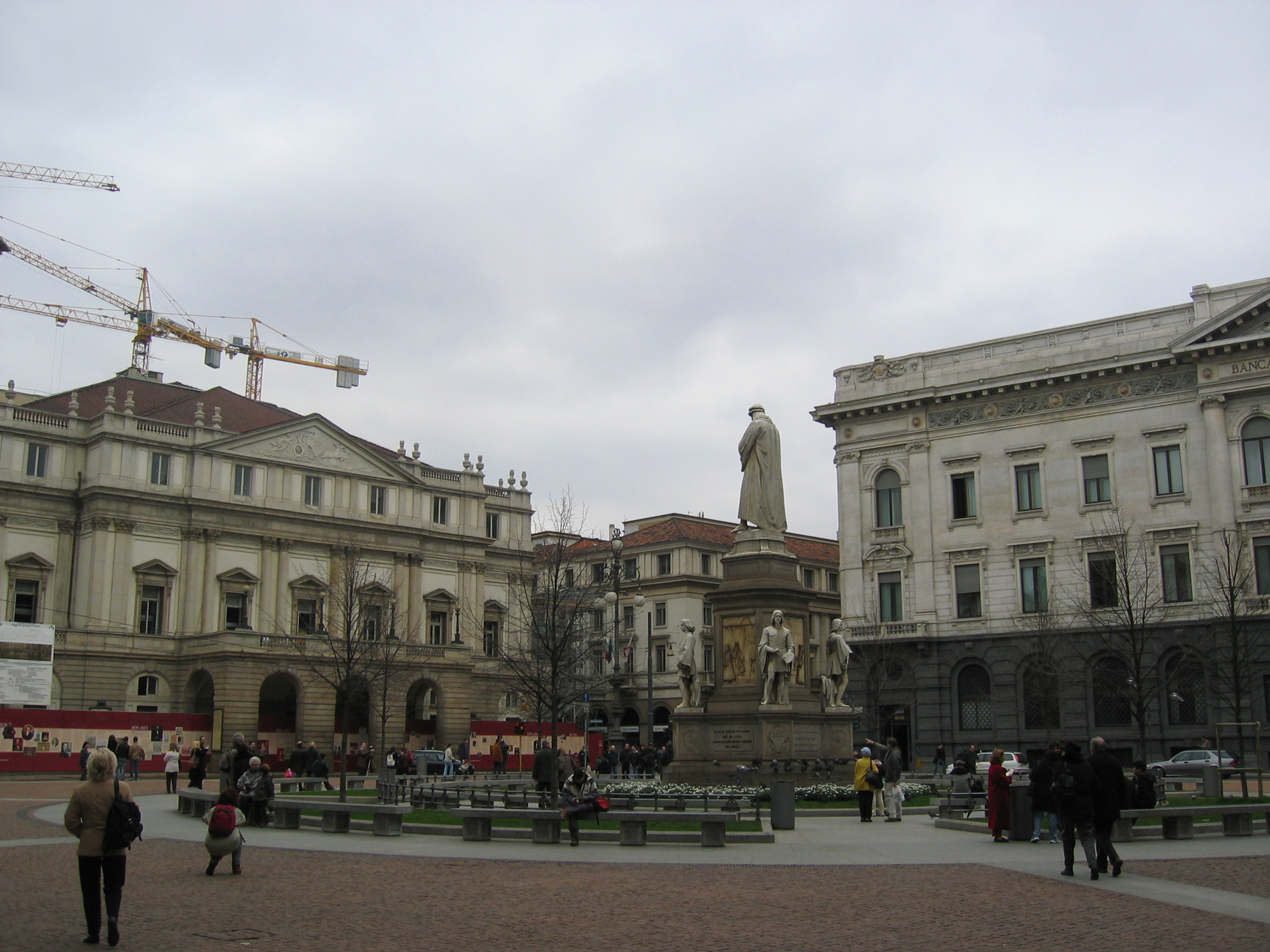
La Scala (on the left) and the BCI palace (on the right)

== History ==
In the early 20th century, the centre of Milan gradually evolved into a prominently financial district. BCI decided to establish a new, more prestigious headquarters building in the area. Architect Luca Beltrami was chosen as the main designer, both because of his renowned talent, and because his fame and personal influence was expected to be helpful in achieving the permissions needed for the work, including permission to demolish a baroque church that occupied part of the designated area for the BCI building. Besides the church, also the "Caffé Martini" café (which was renowned as a gathering place for the Milanese patriots who had fought in the Five Days of Milan) was demolished.

== Architecture ==
Despite the popularity of Art Nouveau in the Milanese architecture of the early 20th century, Beltrami chose to base his design on the neoclassical style. The reason was twofold: on one hand, the neoclassical style was best fit to represent the authority and decorum of a large bank as the Banca Commerciale Italiana; on the other hand, this design created a symmetry with La Scala theatre, which occupies another side of the same plaza. In fact, La Scala was Beltrami's major inspiration.

The main element of the marble facade is the central pediment, with its large columns. The interior of the building (which is still partially preserved), was also decorated in neoclassical style; the hall and the large staircase are the most notable elements. The design also included an underground store, mainly used for safe boxes; some of the original safes, in cast iron, are preserved.
