= Piazza della Scala =

Square in Milan, Italy

Coordinates: 45.4667°N 9.1896°E

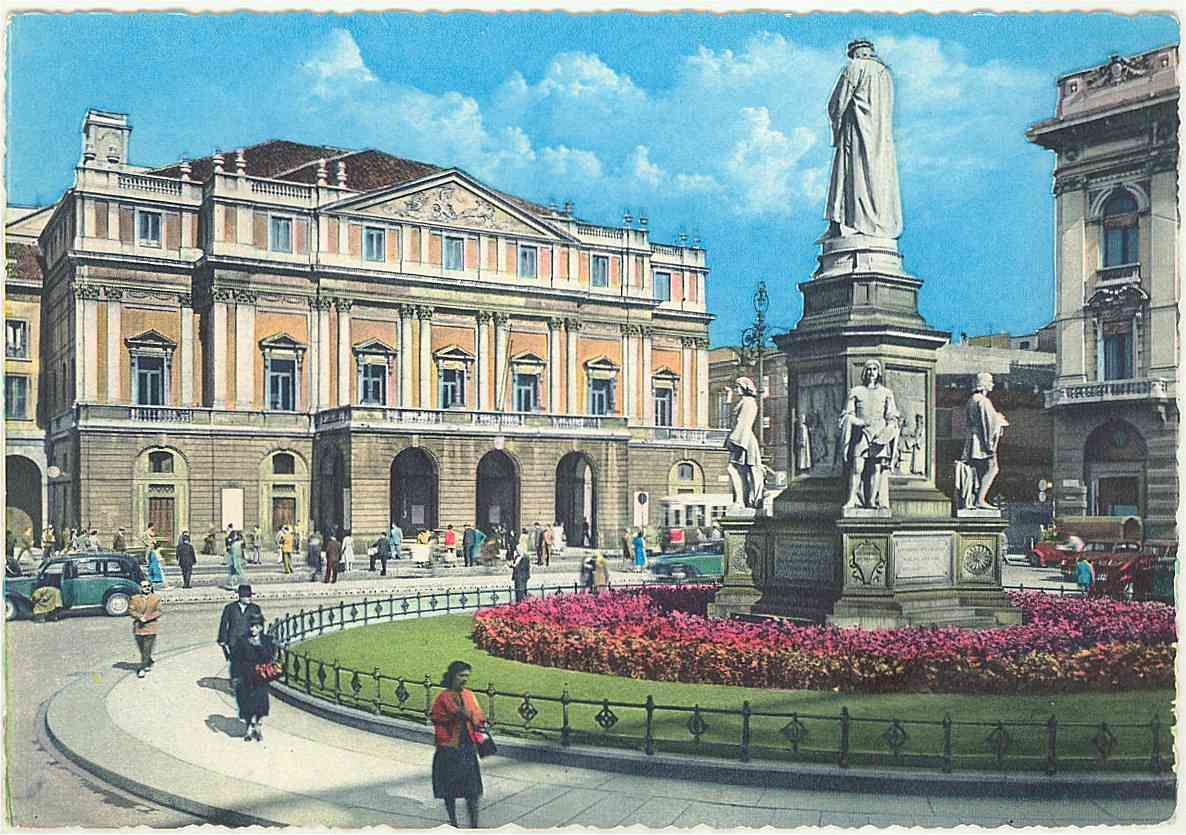
Piazza della Scala in the 1960s, looking north-west; the monument to Leonardo, La Scala on the background, and a corner of the Banca Commerciale Italiana Palace on the far right

Interactive 360° view of the Leonardo monument. In the SVG file, move left and right over the image to rotate the 3D view.

Piazza della Scala is a pedestrian central square of Milan, Italy. It is connected to the main square of Milan, Piazza del Duomo, by the Galleria Vittorio Emanuele II passage. It is named after the renowned Teatro alla Scala opera house, which occupies the north-western side of the square; the building actually includes both the opera house and the Museo Teatrale alla Scala (La Scala Museum), dedicated to the history of La Scala and opera in general. On the opposite side to "La Scala", to the south-east, is the facade of Palazzo Marino, Milan's city hall. Another relevant building on the square, on the north-eastern side, is the Palazzo della Banca Commerciale Italiana. The south-western side of the square has the entry to the Galleria Vittorio Emanuele and Palazzo Beltrami. Most of the architecture of the square is the work of architect Luca Beltrami, who designed the eponymous palace, the facade of Palazzo Marino and the Banca Commerciale Italiana building. The centre of the square is marked by the monument of Leonardo da Vinci by sculptor Pietro Magni (1872).

== History ==
Piazza della Scala is a relatively recent addition to the plan of Milan's centre. The oldest building on the square, Palazzo Marino, dates to 1563; at the time, nevertheless, the square did not exist (the area was occupied by buildings). The main facade of Palazzo Marino was originally the one facing Piazza San Fedele, to the south-east, exactly opposite to Piazza della Scala. Likewise, when La Scala was completed, in 1778, it was facing a street rather than a square. It was only in the late 19th century that the Milanese authorities initiated a thorough renovation of the area, which involved the creation of the square. Luca Beltrami first contributed with Palazzo Beltrami (1886), then with the new facade of Palazzo Marino (1888–1892), and, much later, with the Banca Commerciale building (1923–1927).

== Gallery ==
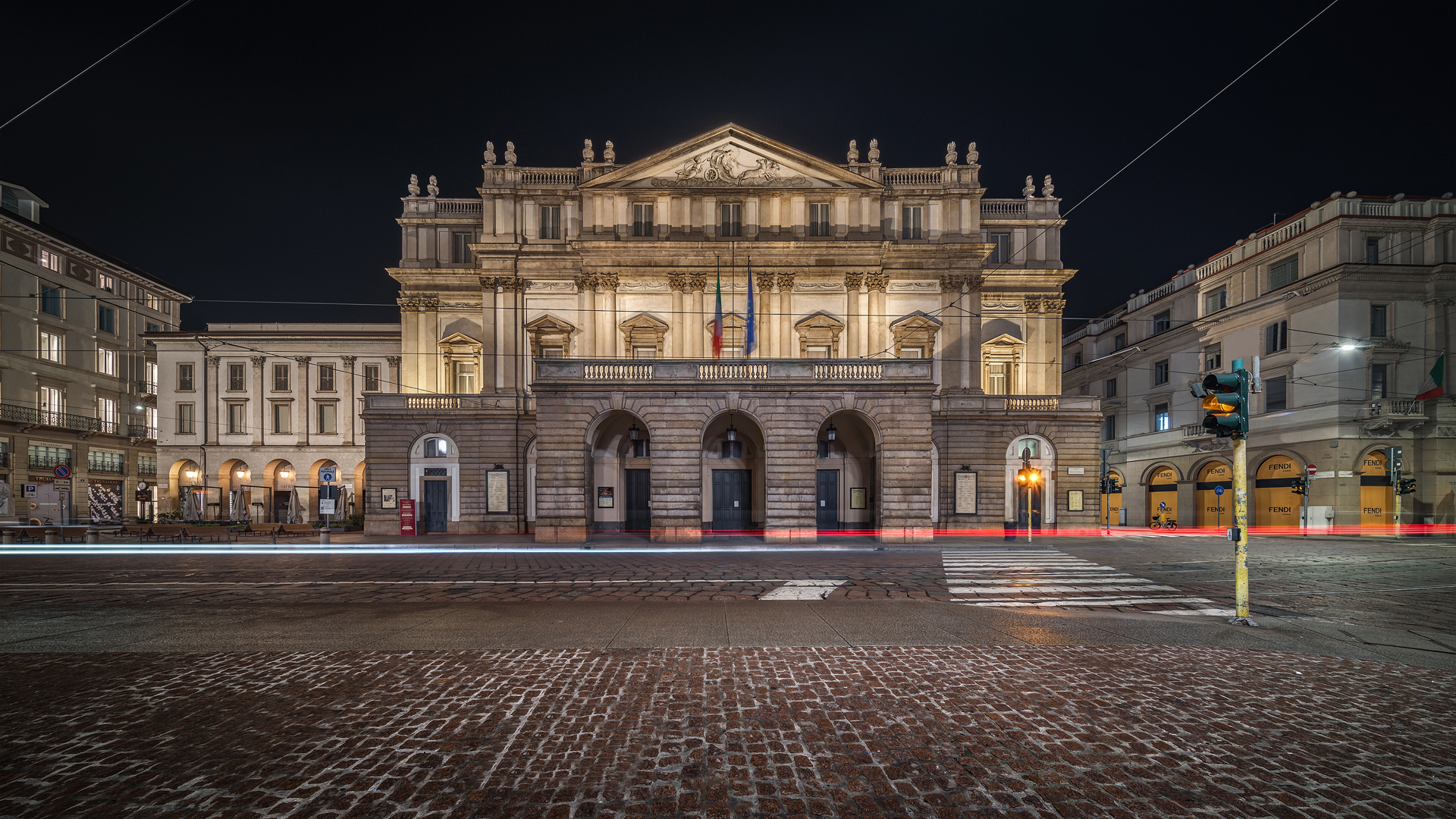
La Scala opera house

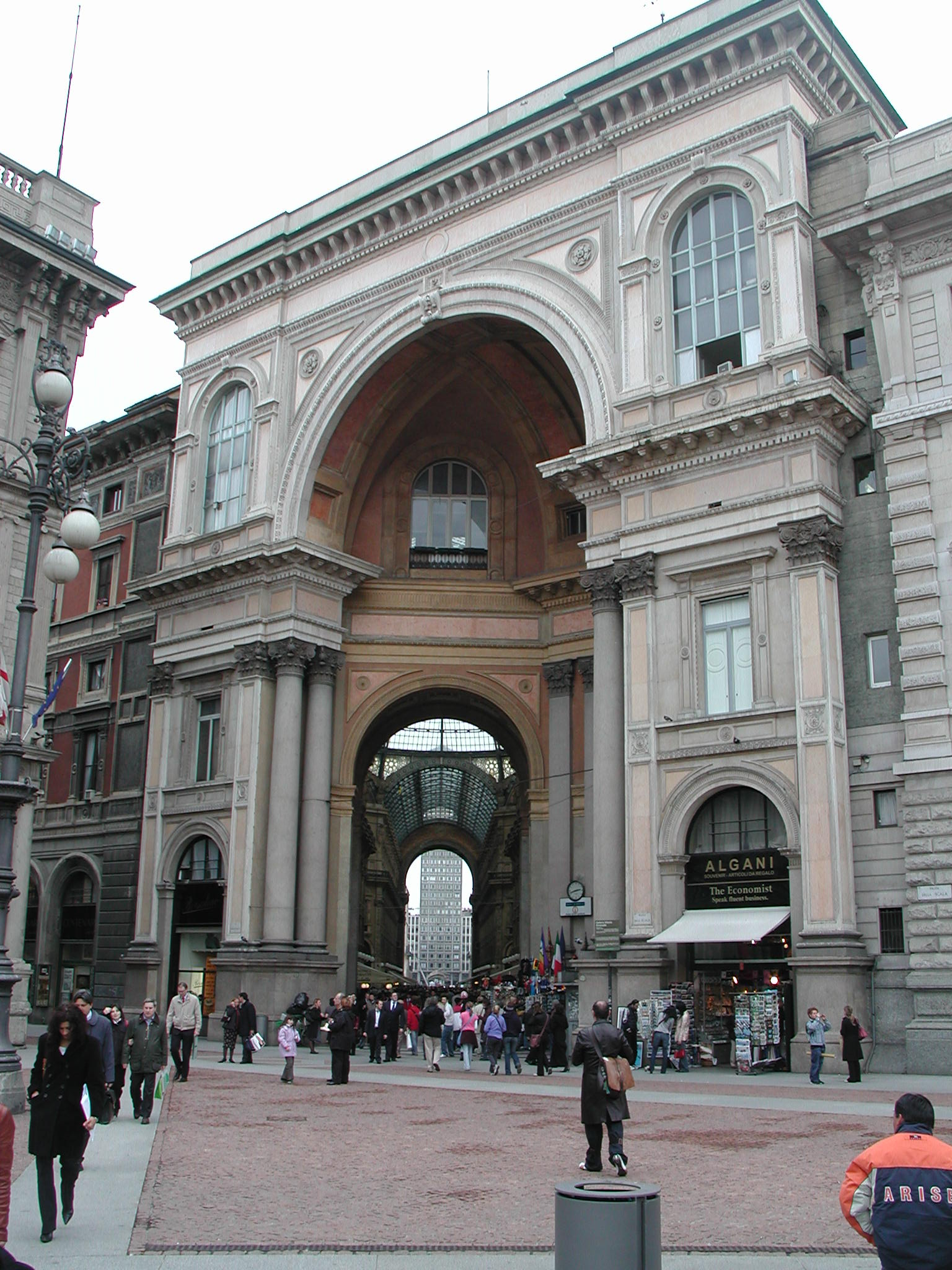
Galleria Vittorio Emanuele II

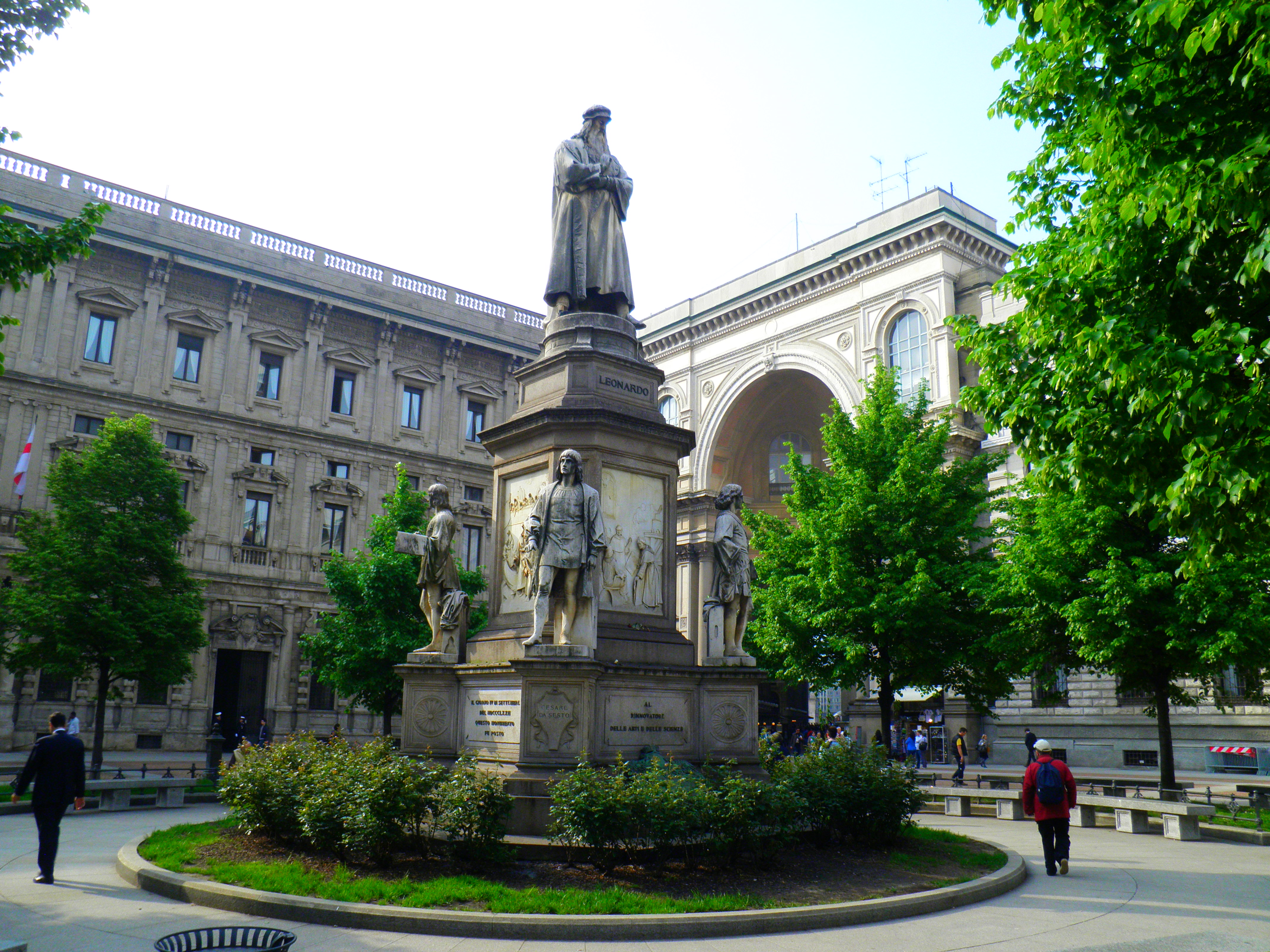
Monument to Leonardo

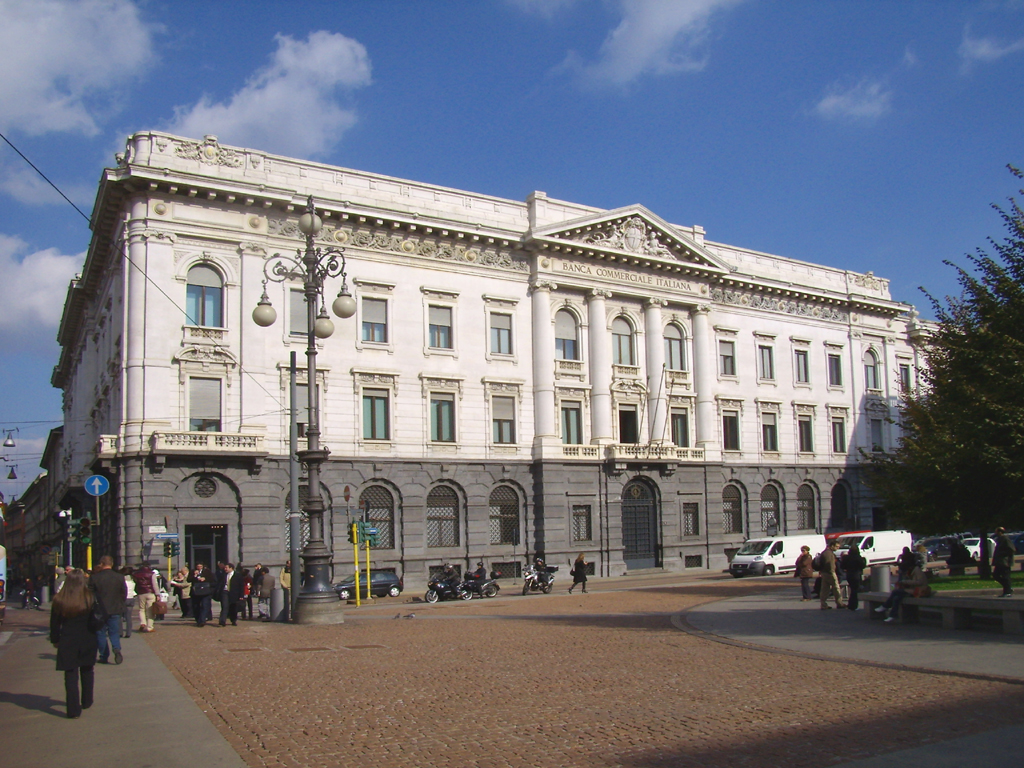
Palazzo della Banca Commerciale Italiana

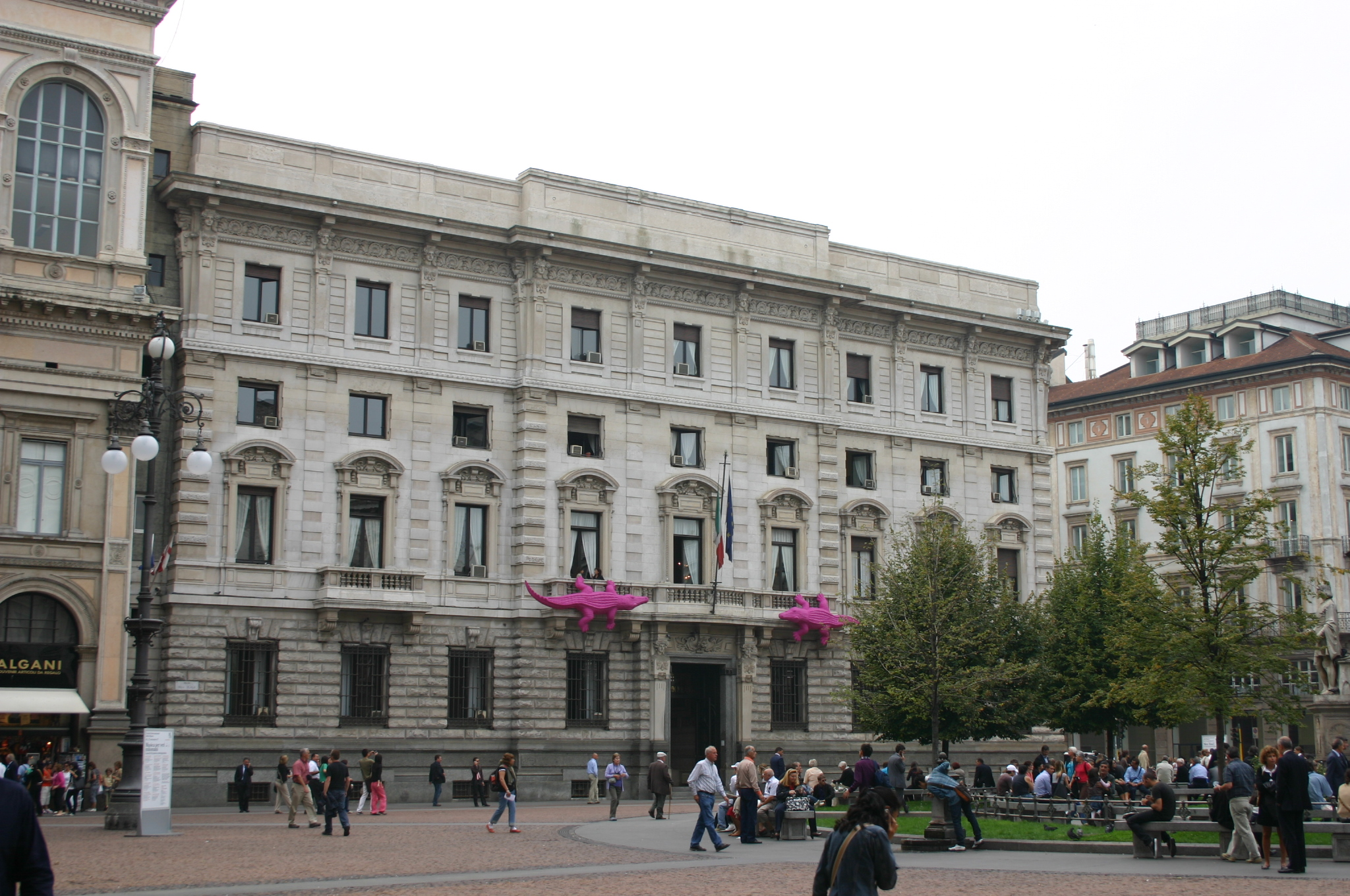
Palazzo Beltrami

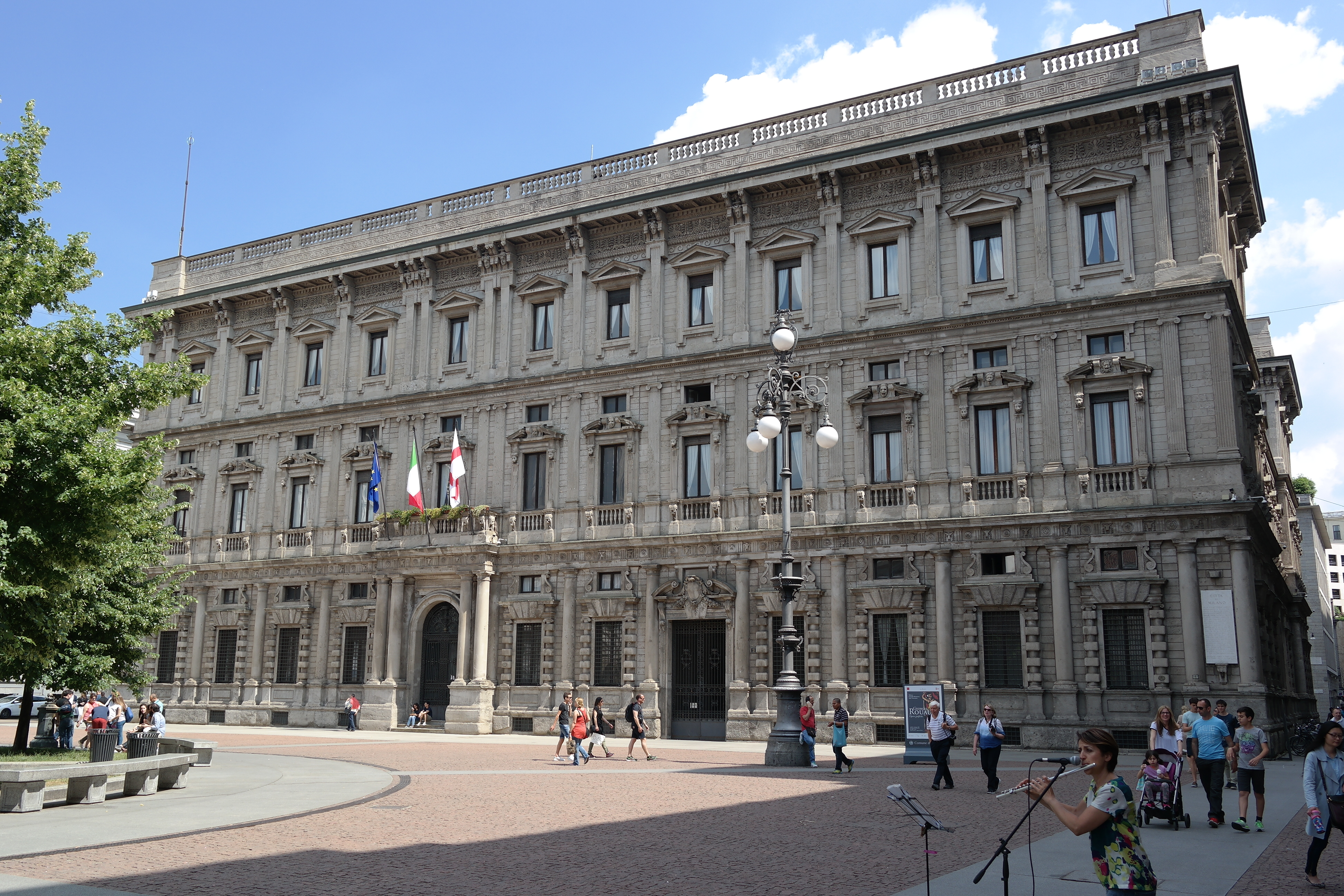
Palazzo Marino
