= Palazzo Marino =

Building in Milan, Italy

Coordinates: 45°27′59.39″N 9°11′26.47″E

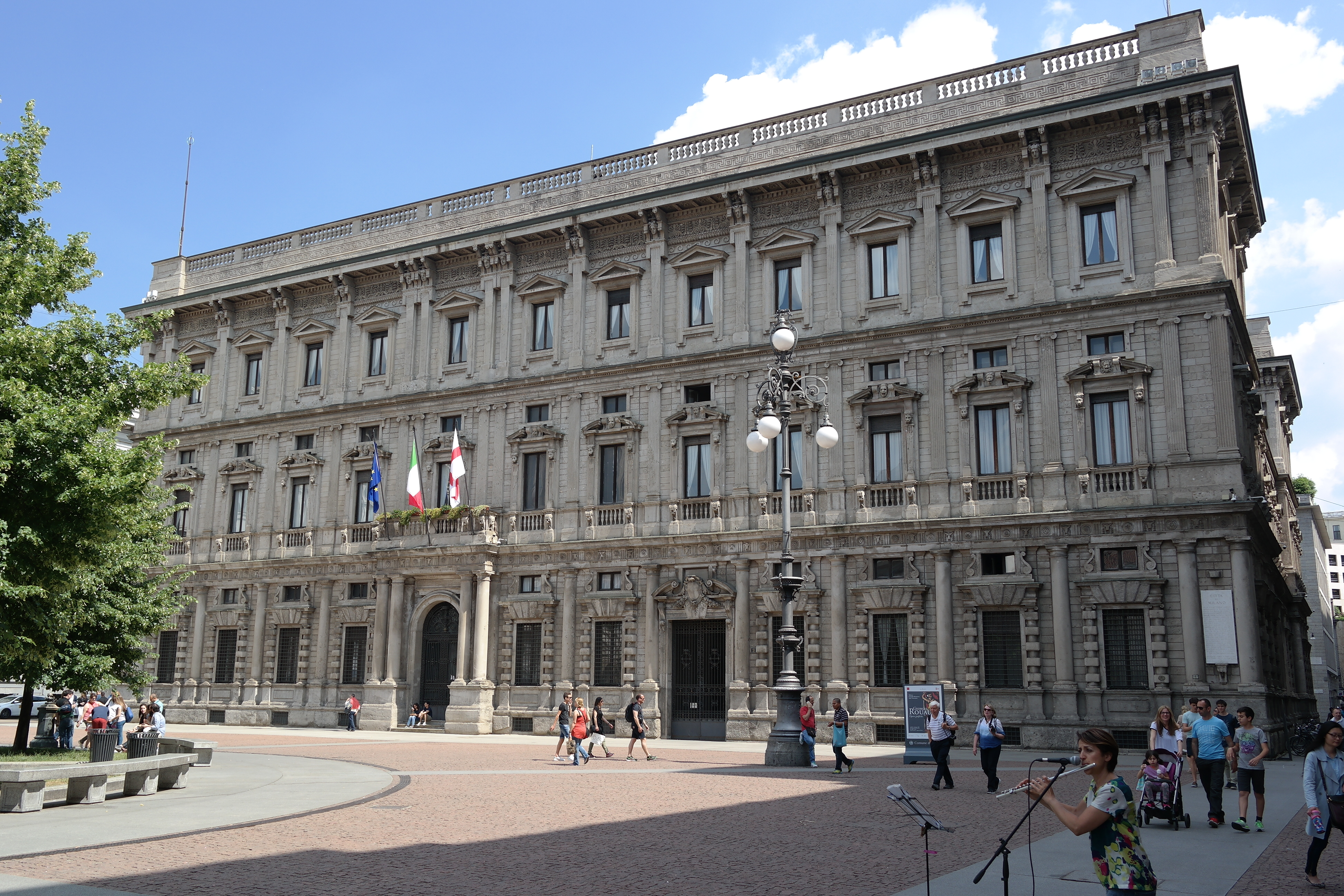
Facade of Palazzo Marino in Piazza della Scala

Palazzo Marino is a 16th-century palace located in Piazza della Scala, in the centre of Milan, Italy. It has been Milan's city hall since 9 September 1861. It borders on Piazza San Fedele, Piazza della Scala, Via Case Rotte and Via Tommaso Marino.

The palace was commissioned by Tommaso Marino, a wealthy 16th-century Genoese banker and merchant. It became a property of the state in 1781.

== History ==
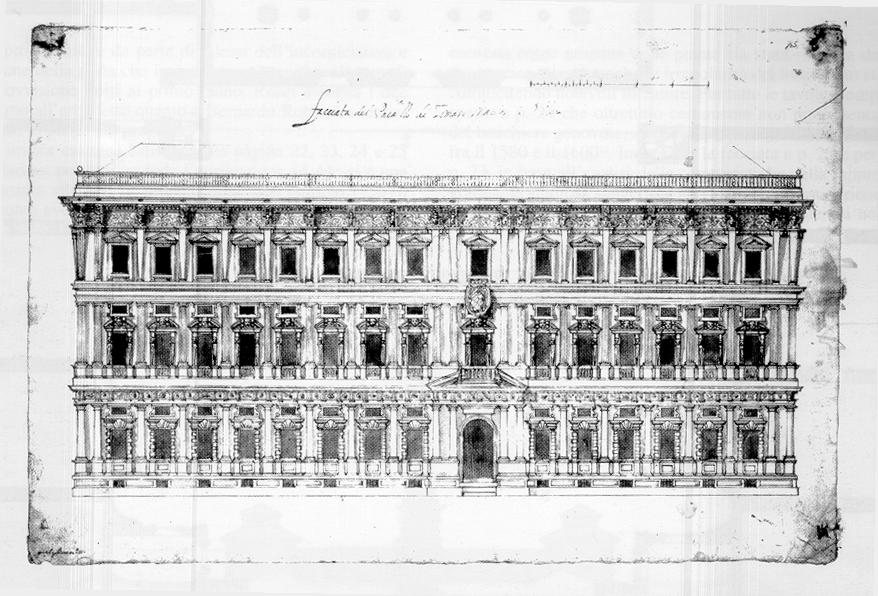
The original design of the facade of the Palace facing Piazza San Fedele (illustration found in the "Raccolta Bianconi", a collection of tables in the Biblioteca Trivulziana, vol.I, p. 25, A 4042)

The palace was built from 1557 to 1563 for Tommaso Marino. It was designed by architect Galeazzo Alessi from Perugia. Its main facade originally faced Piazza San Fedele, as Piazza della Scala at the time was a warren of medieval houses. The construction was occasionally slowed down by the opposition of the population, that had a very conservative attitude towards the architecture of the centre of Milan.

Several sculptors from the Fabbrica del Duomo were involved in the decorations this Palazzo. In the courtyard, sculptures were erected representing the Labours of Hercules and the Metamorphoses. The ceiling of the main hall (now known as "Salone dell'Alessi") had frescos and stuccos with the Marriage of Cupid and Psyche by Andrea Semini and Ottavio Semini.

The four corners of the ceiling were also decorated with paintings by Aurelio Busso representing allegories of the four seasons. Further frescos as well as bas reliefs decorated the walls, with mythological themes such as the Muses, Bacchus, Apollo and Mercury by Ottavio Semini. The reliefs depict the story of Perseus.

When Marino died leaving his family bankrupt, the palace became a property of the State, but in 1632 it was sold to another banker, Carlo Omodei. The House of Omodei never inhabited the palace, which maintained its original name "Marino" and was rented to several notable Milanese.

In 1781, the palace was once again bought by the State (the notable Milanese scholar Pietro Verri had an important role in convincing the authorities to buy the palace) and became the seat of administrative and tax offices. The palace was then restored, with the supervision of architect Giuseppe Piermarini, who was responsible for the renovation of the entire area.

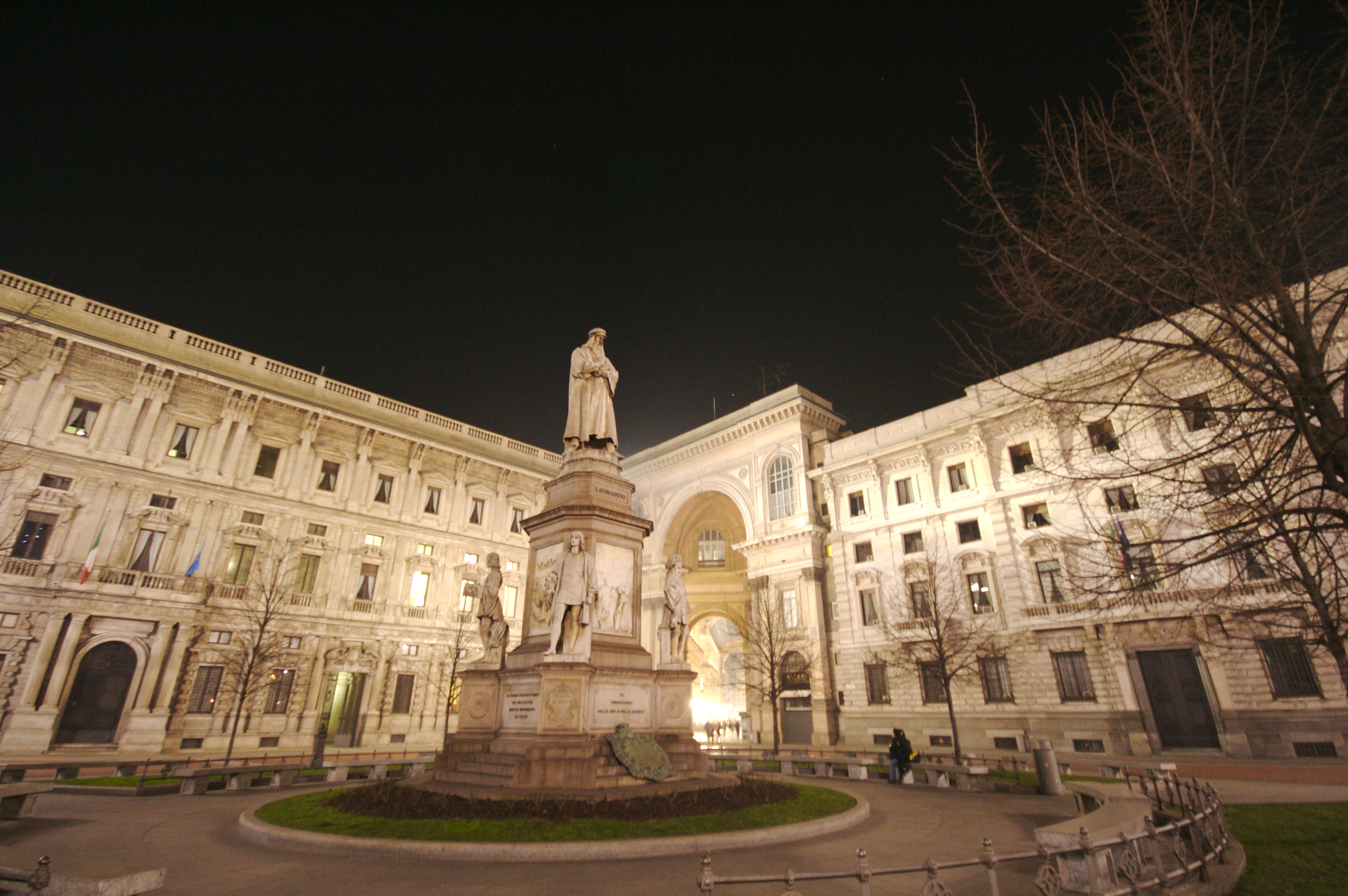
Piazza della Scala: the statue of Leonardo da Vinci, Palazzo Marino (on the left) and the entrance of Galleria Vittorio Emanuele II (on the right)

In 1848, after the Five Days of Milan, the palace was temporarily used as the seat of the new government of Lombardy. It was finally elected as Milan's city hall on 19 September 1861. The acquisition of the palace by the city administration marked a new thorough restoration of the building and the surrounding area. The block that occupied what is now Piazza della Scala was demolished to create the plaza; the facade of Palazzo Marino facing the plaza was renewed to become the palace's main facade (on a design by Luca Beltrami, completed in 1892).

A second major restoration, directed by Arrigo Buonomo, occurred after the end of World War II. The original stuccos and frescos in the Salone dell'Alessi (which had been severely damaged by bombings) were recreated ex novo by notable artists of the time.
