= Galleria Vittorio Emanuele II =

Shopping arcade in Milan, Italy

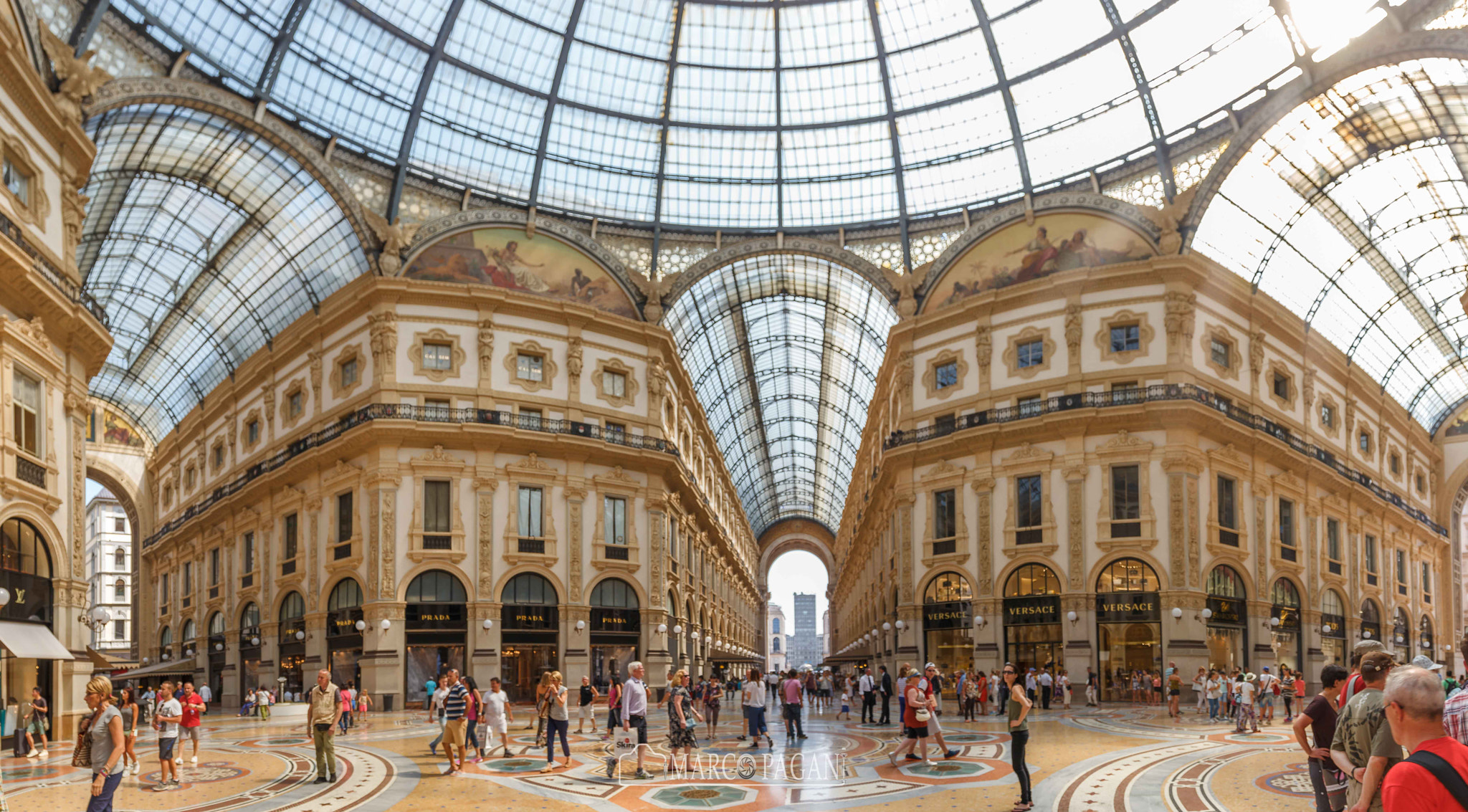
- Location: Milan, Italy
- Coordinates: 45°27′56″N 9°11′24″E
- Opened: 1877
- Owner: Comune of Milan
- Architect: Giuseppe Mengoni
- Public transit: Duomo

The Galleria Vittorio Emanuele II (Italian: [ɡalleˈriːa vitˈtɔːrjo emanuˈɛːle seˈkondo]; Lombard: Galeria Vittori Emanuel) is Italy's oldest active shopping arcade and a major landmark of Milan. Housed within a four-story double arcade in the centre of town, the Galleria is named after Victor Emmanuel II, the first king of the Kingdom of Italy. It was designed in 1861 and built by architect Giuseppe Mengoni between 1865 and 1877.

== Architecture ==
The building under construction

The structure consists of two glass-vaulted arcades intersecting in an octagon covering the street connecting Piazza del Duomo to Piazza della Scala. The street is covered by an arching glass and cast iron roof, a popular design for 19th-century arcades, such as the Burlington Arcade in London, which was the prototype for larger glazed shopping arcades, beginning with the Saint-Hubert Gallery in Brussels (opened in 1847), the Passazh in St Petersburg (opened in 1848), the Galleria Umberto I in Naples (opened in 1890), and the Budapest Galleria.

The central octagonal space is topped with a glass dome. The Milanese Galleria was larger in scale than its predecessors and was an important step in the evolution of the modern glazed and enclosed shopping mall, of which it was the direct progenitor. It has inspired the use of the term galleria for many other shopping arcades and malls.

On the ground of the central octagonal, there are four mosaics portraying the coat of arms of the three capitals of the Kingdom of Italy (Turin, Florence and Rome) plus Milan's. Tradition says that if a person spins around three times with a heel on the testicles of the bull from Turin coat of arms this will bring good luck. This practice causes damage to the mosaic: a hole has developed at the location of the bull's genitals. The mosaic has been restored in 2017 and again in 2026.

The Galleria connects two of Milan's most famous landmarks: The Duomo and the Teatro Alla Scala, but the Galleria is a landmark in its own right.

== The iron-and-glass roof ==
The Milan gallery and its roof have been acknowledged as an important reference on 19th-century iron-and-glass architecture by Pevsner and Hitchcock. As one can still observe today, the roof consists of four barrel vaults (approximately 14.5 m in width and 8.5 m in height) that are crowned with a huge dome (around 37.5 m as internal diameter and 17.10 m in height). The dome is considered a major accomplishment in 19th-century construction due to its large dimensions. Each of the roof parts is topped with a lantern.

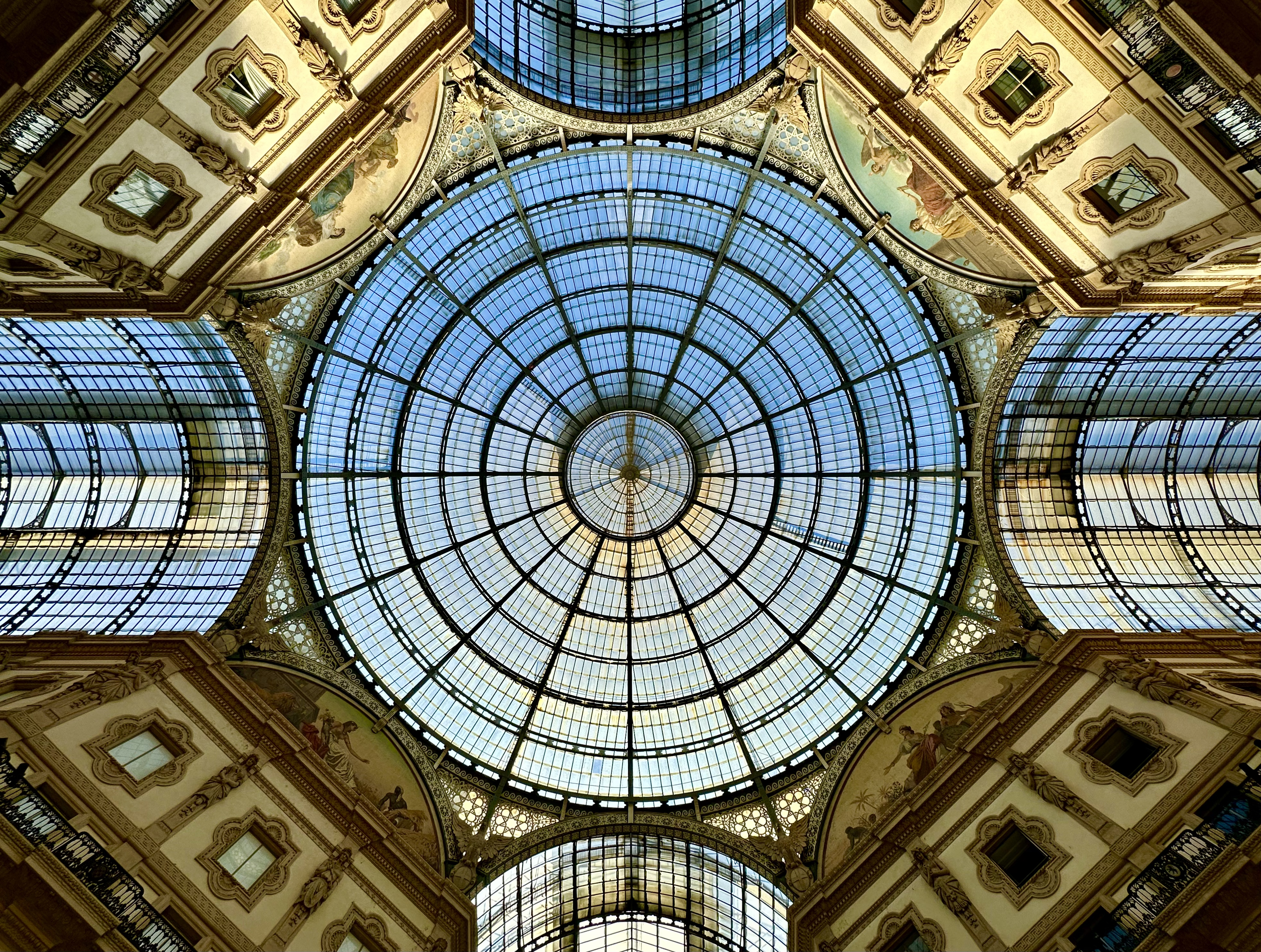
The glass dome

According to Geist, the Milan gallery and the roof were unprecedented in dimensions by previously built shopping arcades. Another difference with already existing passages, was the monumental character of the roof at Milan. Jodice, for example, appreciated the monumental spatial effect of the dome. In comparison to earlier emblematic arcades, such as Galerie d'Orléans (1828–1829) and Galeries Royales Saint-Hubert (1845–1847), the Milan arcade was also special because of the large spans of the vaults and the ethereal effect of the entire glass canopy. The construction of the whole Gallery was the result of international collaboration. This especially concerned the roof: the ironwork was produced, transported and installed by the French Atelier Henry Joret. The glass plates were made of flat ribbed glass by Saint-Gobain. The construction technology of the roof employs primary wrought-iron arches in order to support the glazing. By contrast, arcades that were built earlier were smaller and had simpler roofs: the same components were used for both load bearing and glazing purposes. In addition, the roof at Milan was equipped with invisible reinforcements in the supporting walls. This complicated roof is discussed as the unity of four systems that were skillfully combined through characteristic construction details. This construction technology was creative for avoiding visible tie-rods in the spans of the vaults and the dome, for a special effect of the glass plates and for the glazing bars.

The historical roof was heavily damaged during the aerial bombings of World War II. Before that the roof had undergone multiple maintenance interventions. Serious problems in the roof were reported in the 1970s, and some of them were solved in the 1980s. The present-day roof has gone through different historic modifications and represents complicated conservation issues. In 2015, in preparation for Expo Milano 2015, the facades, statues, and mosaics underwent detailed cleaning and repair, using a giant moving crane scaffolding system.

== Shops, restaurants and hotels ==
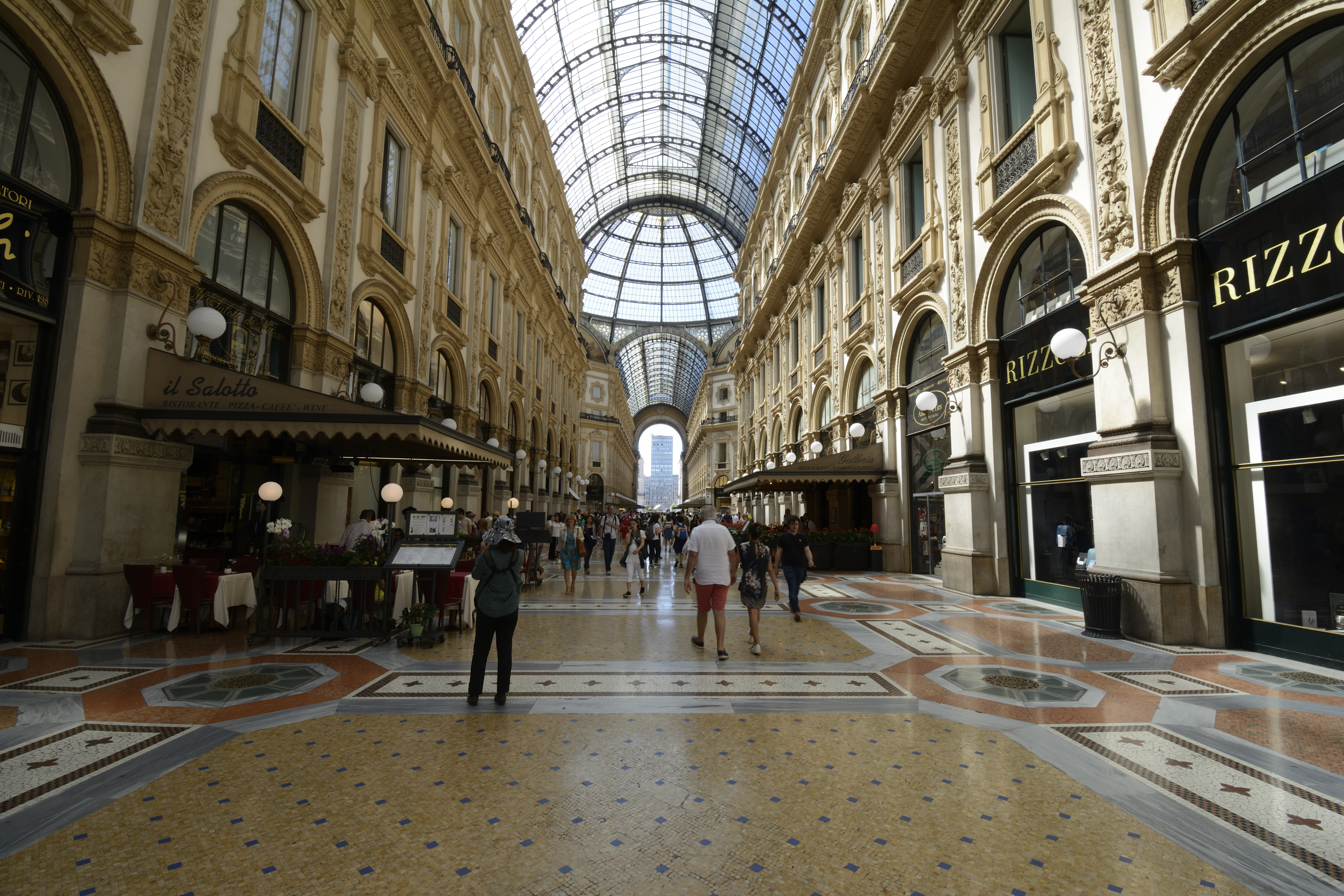
A view of the shops and coffeehouses

The Galleria is often nicknamed il salotto di Milano (Milan's drawing room), due to its numerous shops and importance as a common Milanese meeting and dining place.

As of 2013, the arcade principally contains luxury retailers selling haute couture, jewelry, books and paintings, as well as restaurants, cafés, bars, and a hotel, the Town House Galleria. The Galleria is famous for being home to some of the oldest shops and restaurants in Milan, such as Biffi Caffè (founded in 1867 by Paolo Biffi, pastry chef to the monarch), the Savini restaurant, Borsalino hat-shop (1883) and the Art Nouveau classic Camparino.

== Gallery ==
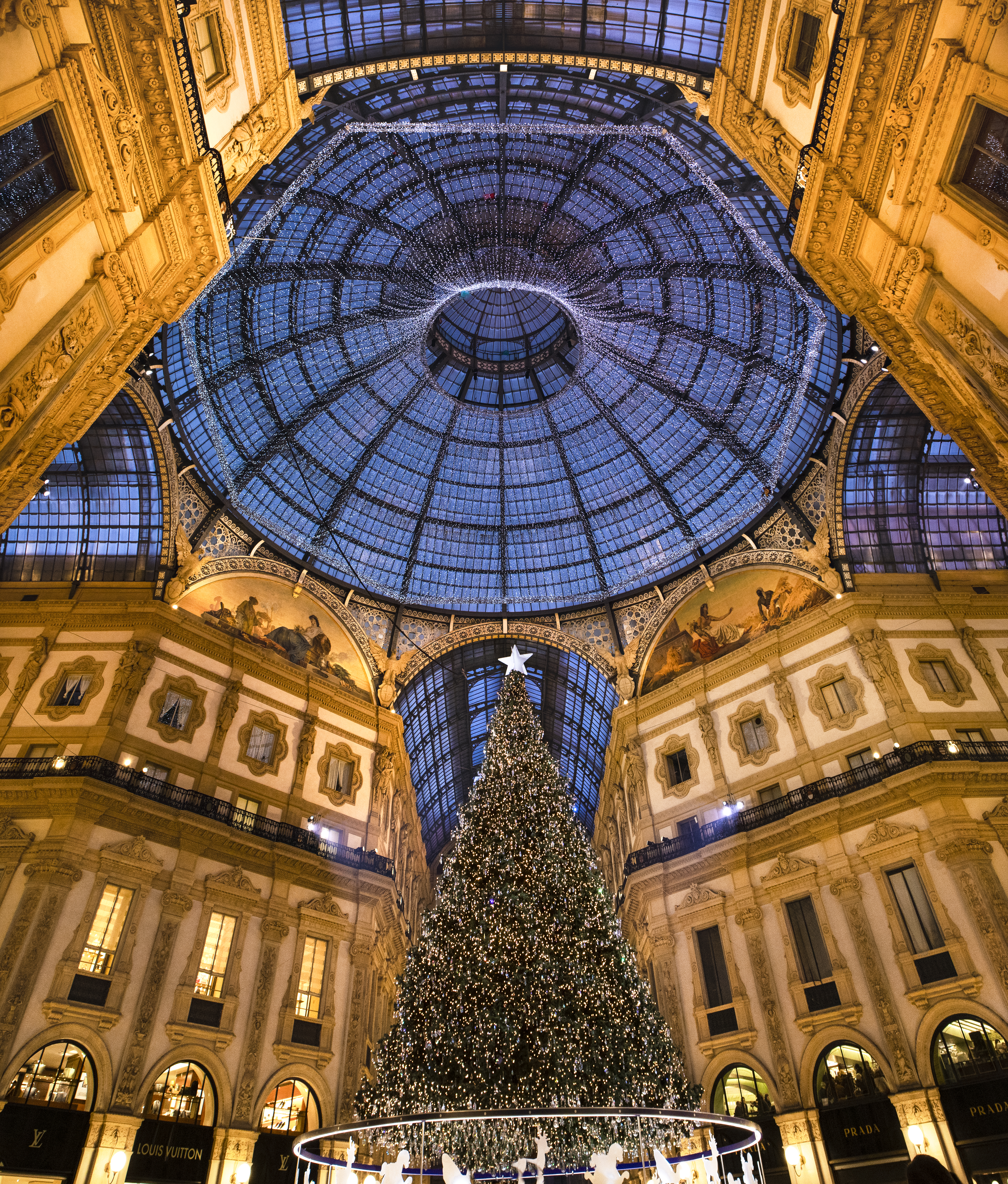
Galleria Vittorio Emanuele II at Christmas

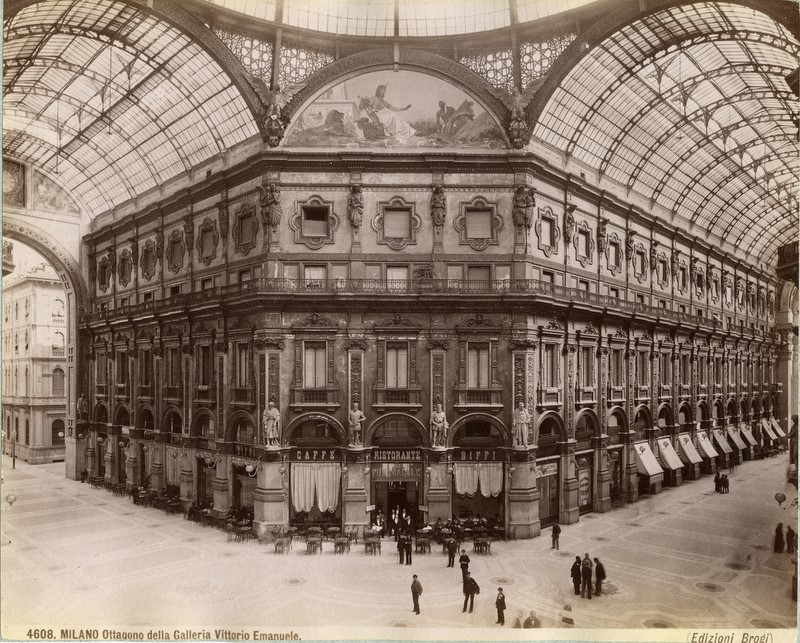
Galleria Vittorio Emanuele II from inside the arcade, c. 1880

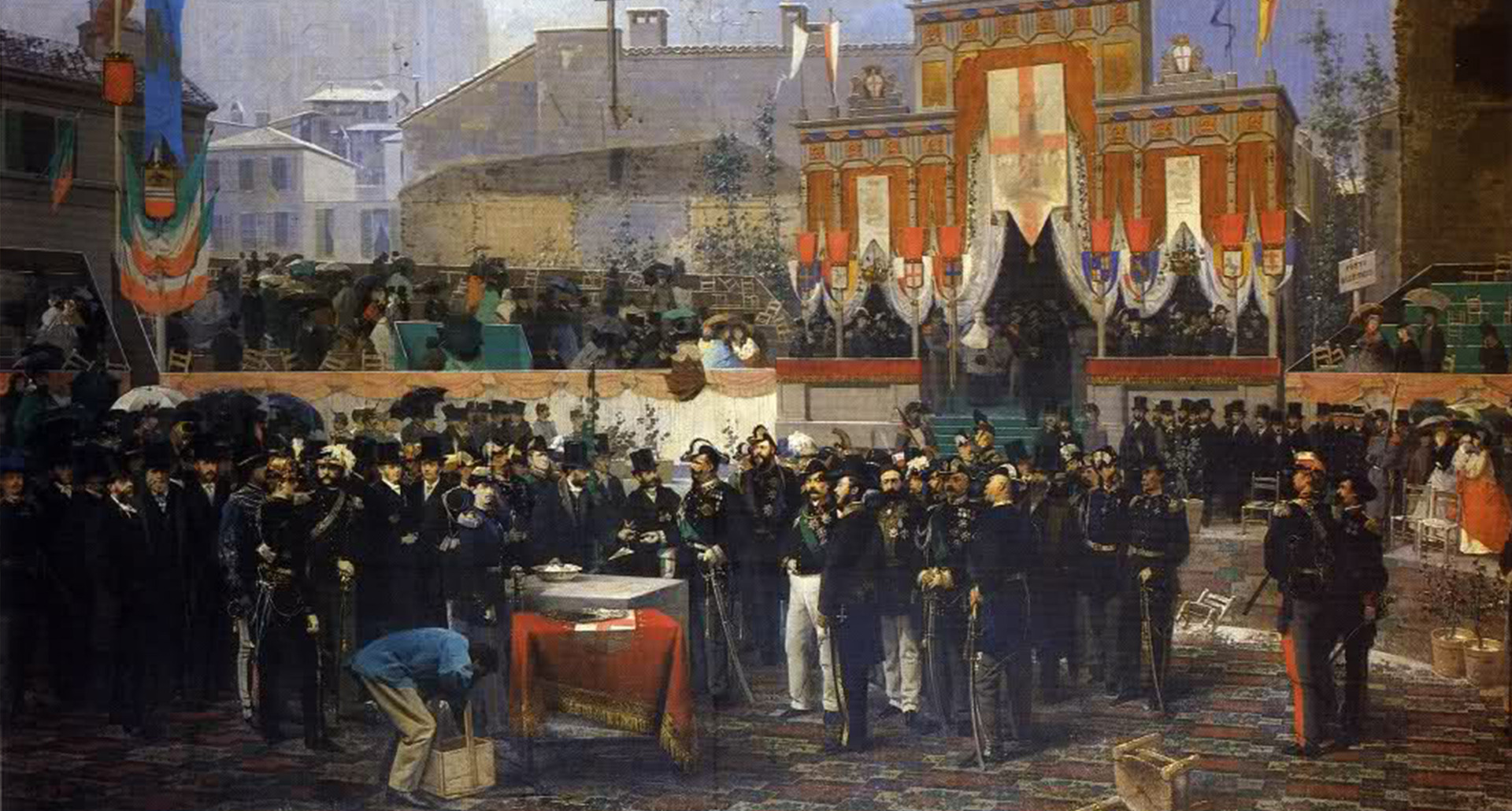
The Galleria Vittorio Emanuele II's first stone

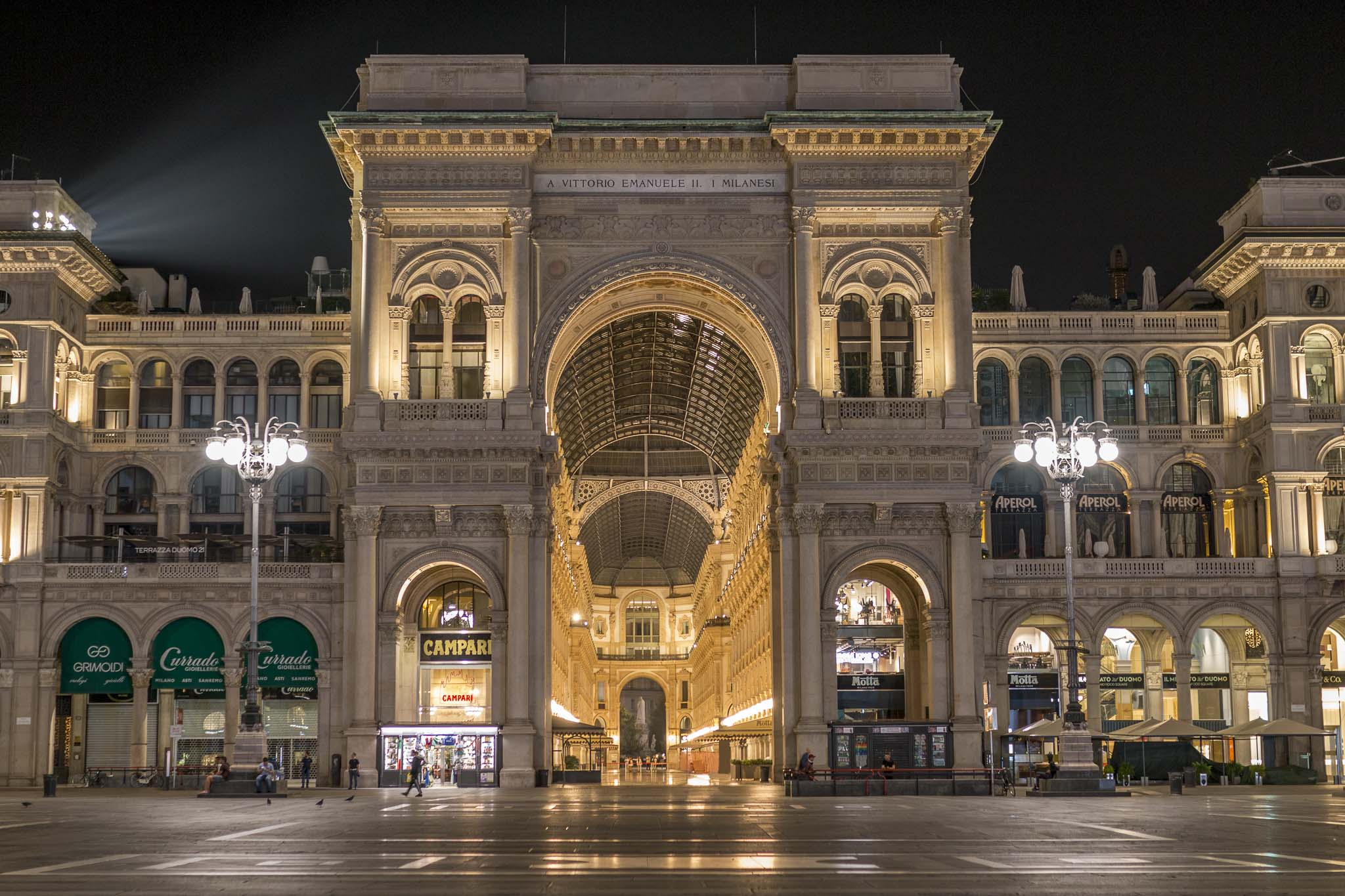
The Galleria's triumphal arch entrance

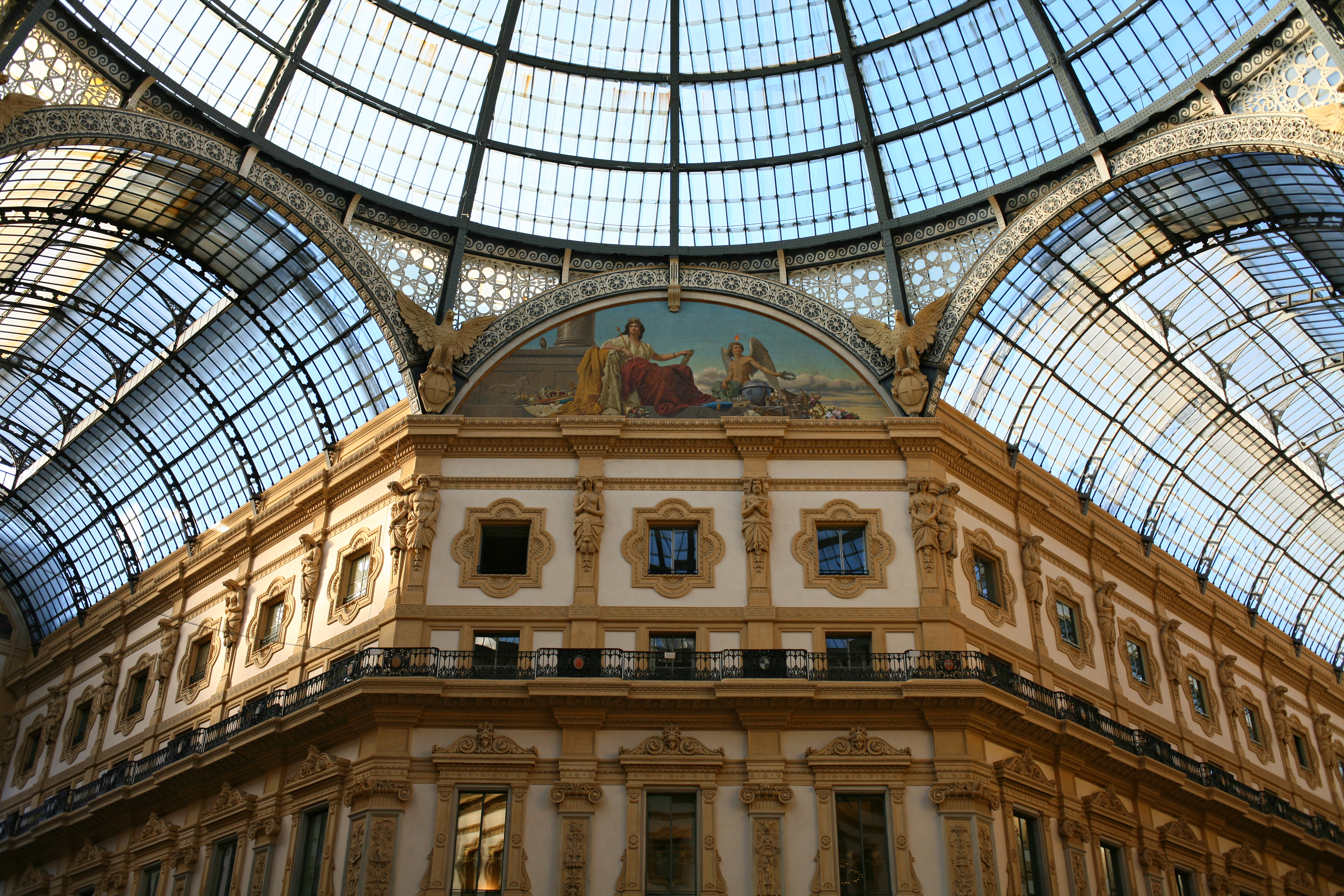
The Galleria from inside the arcade

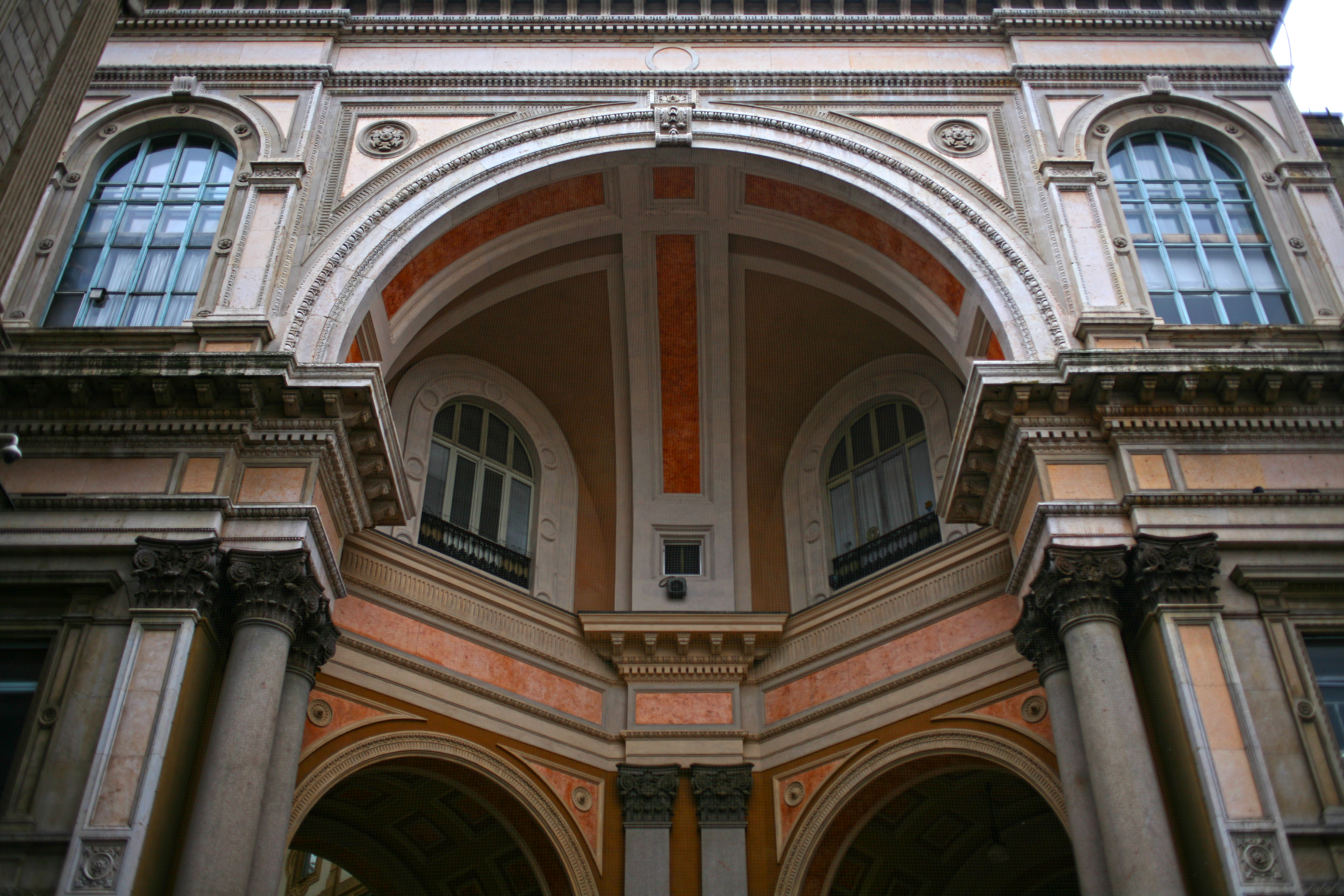
Detail of the exedra at the exit of the gallery on Piazza della Scala

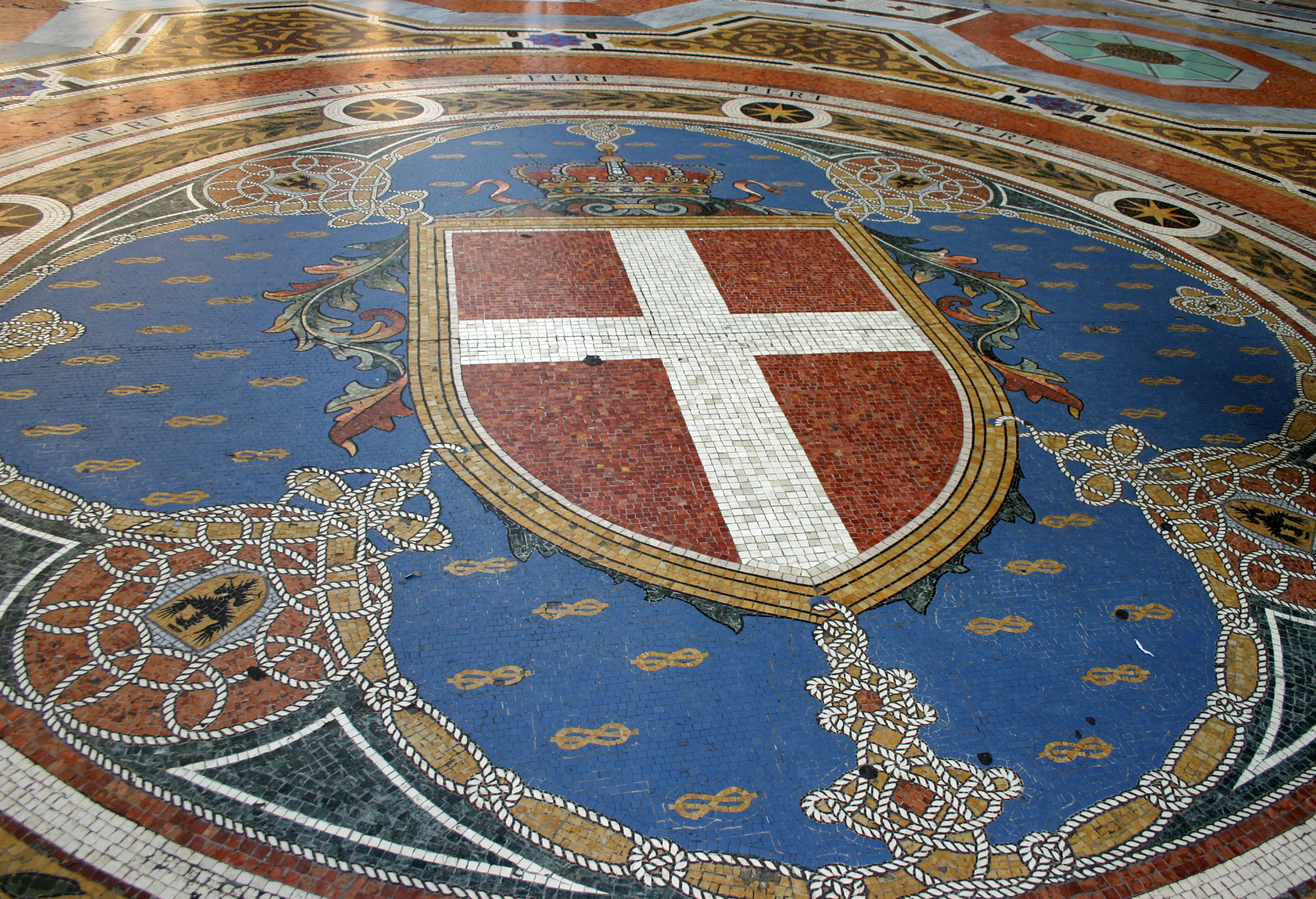
Floor mosaic

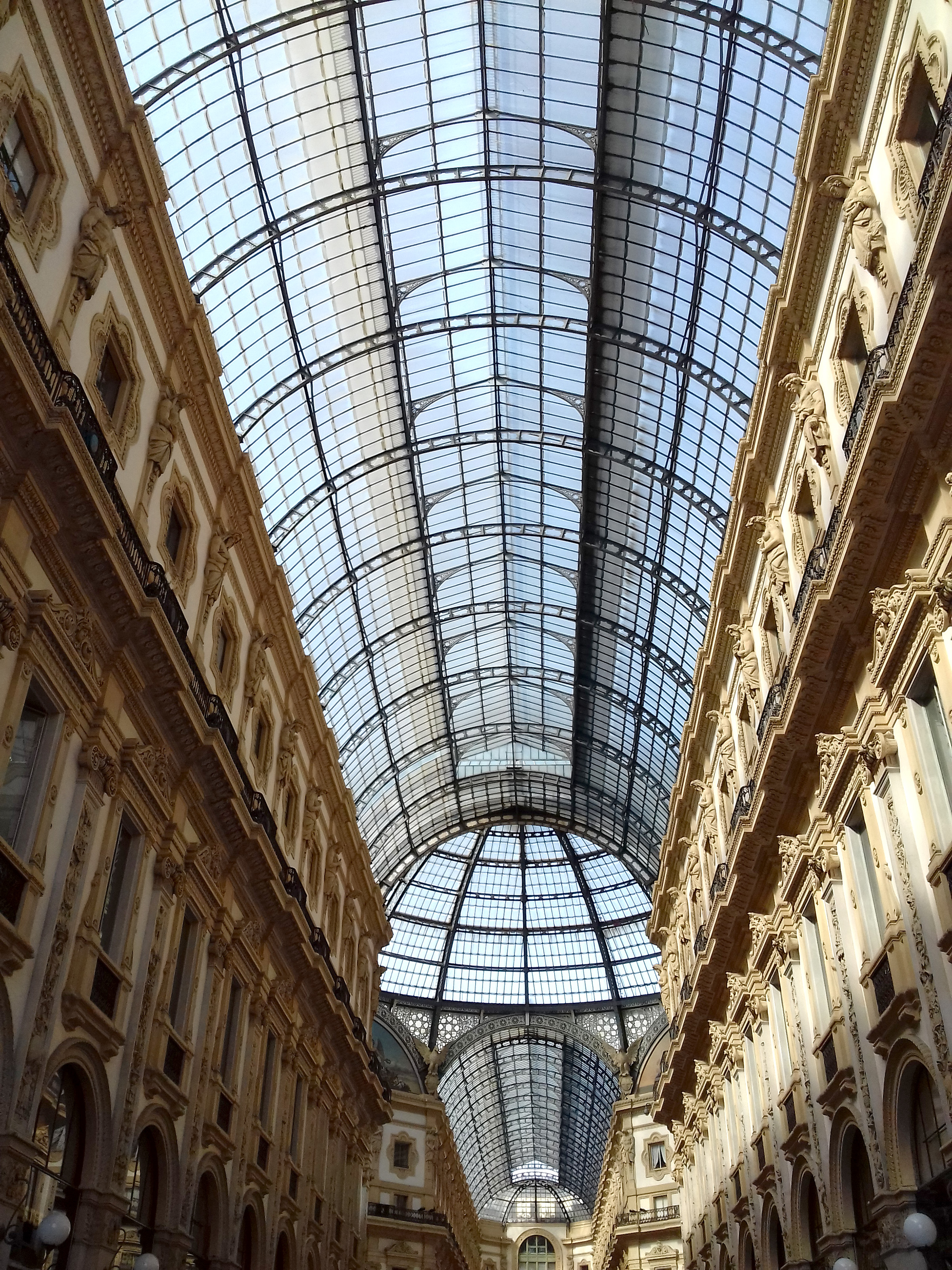
Vertical photo of Galleria Vittorio Emanuele

== See also ==
- Arcade (architecture)
- Galleria Umberto I
