= Broletto =

Seat of government in medieval Italian communes

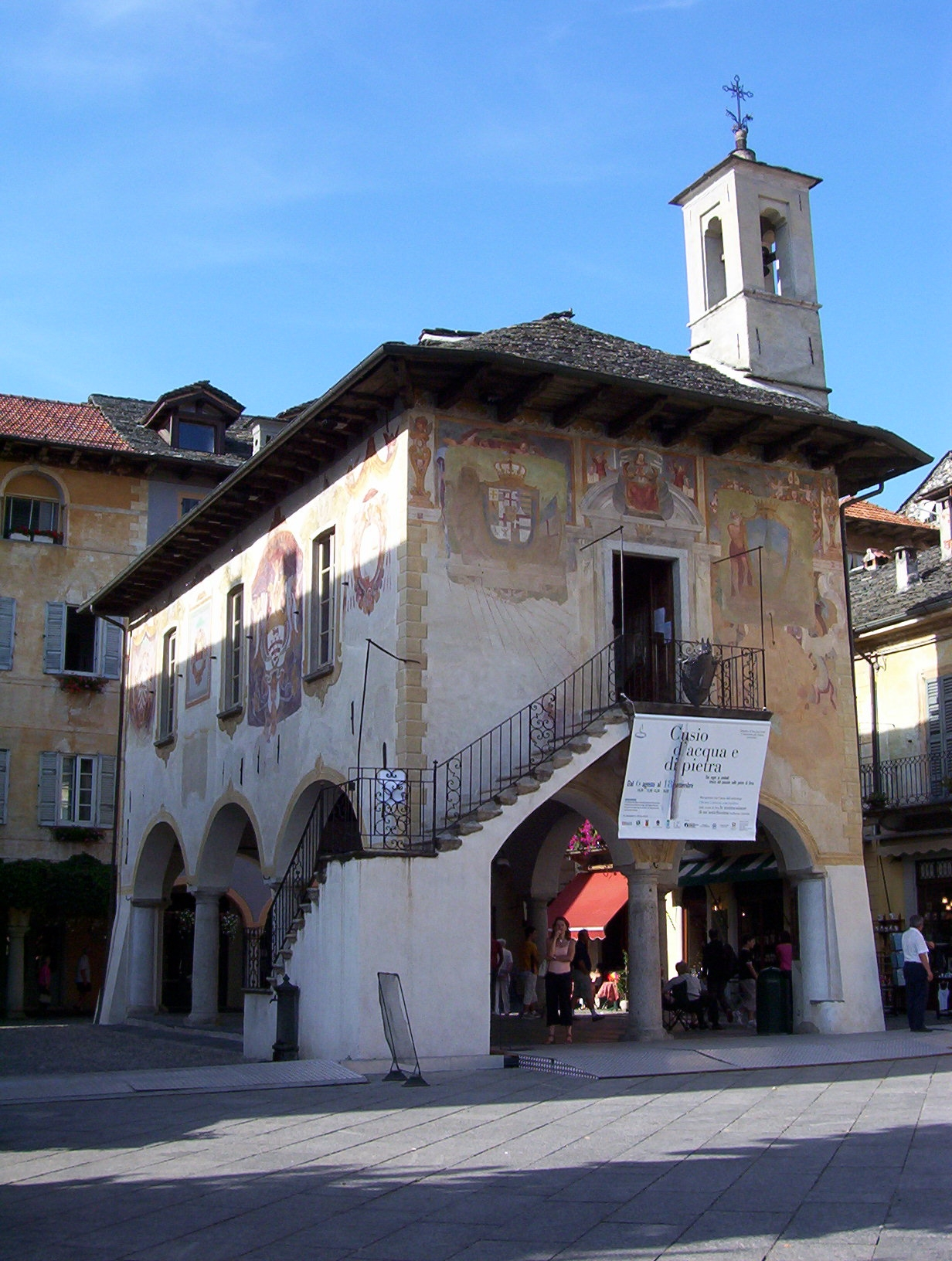
The broletto at Orta San Giulio, on Lake Orta

A broletto in medieval Italian communes was the place where the whole population met for democratic assemblies, and where the elected men lived and administered justice.

Broletto is an ancient Italian word, from Medieval Latin "broilum, brogilum", which probably derives from a Celtic word. Its first meaning is "little orchard or garden"; hence the meaning "field surrounded by a wall".

Ancient broletti are major buildings in Milan, Brescia, Pavia, Piacenza, Como, Monza, Reggio Emilia, Novara and others. Several places or buildings in northern Italy are called "broletto".

== List ==
- Broletto, Arona in Arona, province of Novara
- Palazzo della Ragione, Bergamo in Bergamo
- Broletto, Brescia
- Broletto, Como in Como
- In Cremona, two examples of broletti:
  - the Guelph Palazzo Cittanova
  - the Ghibelline Palazzo del Comune (Cremona)
- Broletto, Lodi in Lodi
- Palazzo del Podestà, Mantua
- In Milan:
  - Palazzo della Ragione, Milan or Broletto Nuovo, one of three broletti
  - Palazzo Carmagnola, formerly Broletto Nuovissimo, today hosting the Piccolo Teatro (Milan)
- Arengario (Monza)
- Broletto (Melegnano)
- Broletto, Novara in Novara
- Broletto, Orta or Palazzo della Comunità, in Orta San Giulio, province of Novara
- Broletto, Pavia in Pavia
- Broletto, Perugia in Perugia, current seat of the Umbria region
- Palazzo Comunale, Piacenza, or il Gotico
- Broletto, Reggio Emilia in Reggio Emilia
- Palazzo dell'Arengo (Rimini) in Rimini
- Palazzo Biumi and Palazzo Pretorio, Varese in Varese

== See also ==
- Arengario and Arengo
- Palazzo Comunale (disambiguation)
- Palazzo del Podesta (disambiguation)
- Palazzo Pretorio (disambiguation)
- Palazzo della Ragione (disambiguation)
