= Palazzo del Podestà =

Palazzo del Podestà is Italian for "Palace of the Chief Magistrate" of a town.

Palazzo del Podestà may refer to:

- Palazzo del Podestà, Bologna, a civic building in Bologna
- Palazzo del Podestà, Galluzzo, a building in Florence; see List of palaces in Italy
- Palazzo del Podestà, Forlì, a civic building in Forlì
- Palazzo del Podestà, Mantua, a palazzo and site of municipal offices
- Palazzo del Podestà, Verona near Piazza dei Signori, Verona
- Palazzo del Podestà, Viterbo, a civic building in Viterbo
- Palazzo vecchio del Podestà, near Piazza del Duomo, San Gimignano
  - Palazzo Comunale, San Gimignano, a palazzo that was the podestà of San Gimignano during the 14th century
- Palazzo Podestà, a World Heritage site in Genoa
- The Bargello, formerly Palazzo del Podestà, now an art museum in Florence
- Part of the Broletto, Novara, a broletto (place of assembly) in Novara

== See also ==
- Podestà
- Palazzo Comunale (disambiguation)
- Palazzo Pretorio (disambiguation)
- Palazzo della Ragione (disambiguation)
- Arengario, Italian government buildings of different historic periods
- Arengo, the assembly of San Marino from the fifth century
