= Podesta (surname) =

In the past, the Podesta was a high official in Italian republics of the medieval or early modern period. (Currently, Podestà is still the title of some Italian magistrates, and of mayors in Italian-speaking municipalities of Graubünden in Switzerland.)

By extension, the word has been used in English to designate a particularly powerful government official or potentate.

The Italian title gave rise to a surname, which then gave rise to a company name.

== Spelling variants ==
The surname has Italian, Spanish and English-language spellings which vary only by the position of an accent over the final "a".

=== Podestà variant ===
In its Italian-language spelling (grave accent over the "a") the name "Podestà" may refer to:

- Agostino Podestà (1905–1969), Italian fascist politician
- Giovanni Andrea Podestà (1608–c.1674), Italian painter
- Guido Podestà (born 1947), Italian politician
- Massimo Podestà, Italian artist
- Rossana Podestà (1934–2013), Italian actress
- Stefano Podestà (born 1939), Italian academic and politician

=== Podestá variant ===
In its Spanish-language spelling (with an acute accent over the "a") the name "Podestá" may refer to:

- Alberto Podestá (1924–2015), Argentine tango singer
- Babsie Podestá (1912–2004), Maltese water polo player
- Cristian Podestá (born 1991), Argentine footballer
- Horacio Podestá (1911–1999), Argentine rower
- Inti Podestá (born 1978), Uruguayan footballer
- Jerónimo Podestá (1920–2000), Argentine bishop
- María Esther Podestá (1896–1983), Argentine actress
- Octavio Podestá (born 1929), Uruguayan sculptor
- Pablo Podestá (1875–1923), Uruguayan-Argentine stage actor, singer, acrobat
- Raúl Podestá (1899–1970), Argentine painter and sculptor

=== Podesta variant ===
In its English-language spelling (with no accent), the name "Podesta" may refer to:

- Andrea Giacomo Podesta (1620–after 1640), Italian engraver and painter
- Heather Podesta (born 1970), American lobbyist
- John Podesta (born 1949), American lawyer, White House Chief of Staff of Bill Clinton
  - Podesta emails
- Tony Podesta (born 1943), American lobbyist

=== Other variants ===
- Erika Podest, Panamanian environmental earth scientist
- Paul DePodesta (born 1972), American baseball and football executive

== See also ==
- Podesta (disambiguation)
- Palazzo del Podesta (disambiguation)
