= Podesta (disambiguation) =

Podestà is the name given to certain high officials in many Italian cities beginning in the later Middle Ages.

Podesta or Podestà may also refer to:

== People ==
- Podesta (surname)
- Podestà of Constantinople, the official in charge of Venetian possessions in the Latin Empire and the Venetian quarter of Constantinople during the 13th century
- Podestà-troubadours, Italian troubadours who were also podestas

== Places ==
- Podesta (island), a phantom island reported in 1879
- Pablo Podestá, Buenos Aires, a town in Buenos Aires Province, Argentina
- Palazzo del Podesta (disambiguation), a number of palaces in Italy
- Teatro Municipal Coliseo Podestá, a theatre in La Plata, Argentina

== Business and economy ==
- Podesta Baldocchi, a florist in San Francisco, founded in 1871
- Podesta Group, a lobbying and public affairs firm based in Washington, D.C.
- Heather Podesta + Partners, American government relations firm

== See also ==
- Podesta emails, the compromised email account of John Podesta, Hillary Clinton's 2016 U.S. presidential campaign chairman
- Podestat Formation, a geologic formation in France
- Cesar Torque Podesta Airport, an airport serving the city of Moquegua, Peru
