= Broletto (Melegnano) =

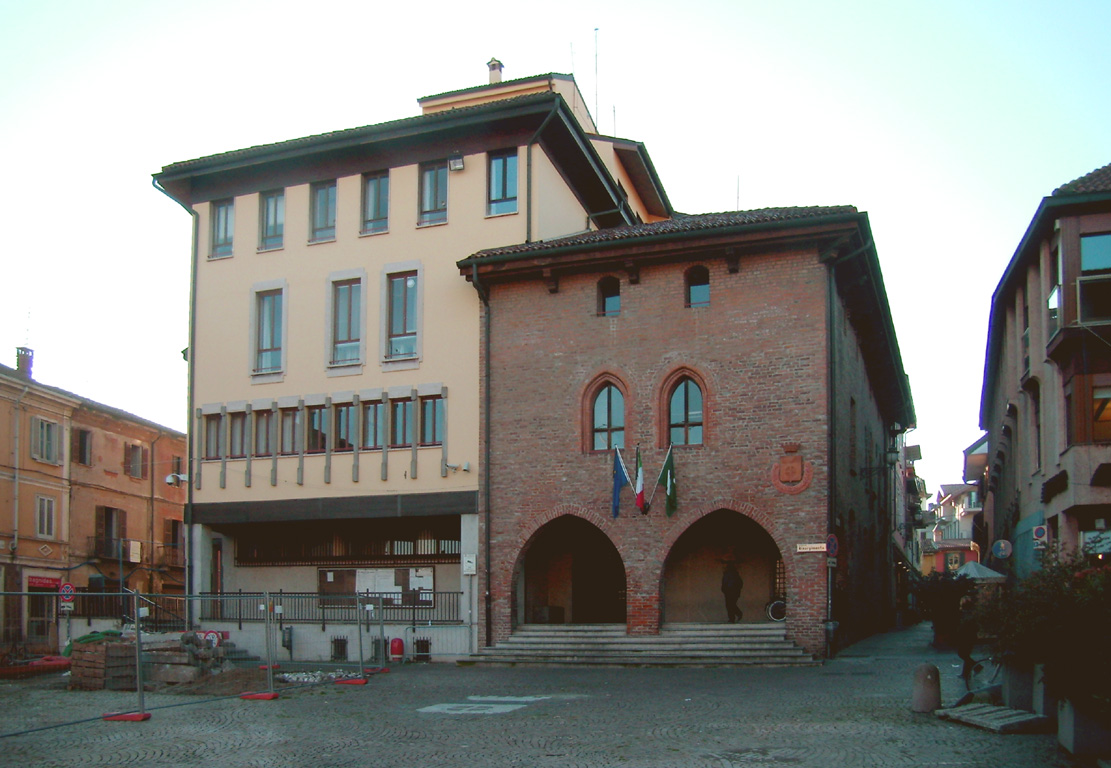
- Facade Broletto (Melegnano)
- Interactive map of the Broletto (Melegnano) area

General information
- Status: In use
- Type: Palace
- Architectural style: Gothic
- Location: Melegnano, Lombardia, Italy, Piazza Risorgimento – Melegnano
- Coordinates: 45.357583°N 9.32432°E
- Current tenants: municipal palace
- Construction started: 15th century

The Broletto is the municipal palace of the Lombardy town of Melegnano. It constitutes a rare example of a Lombard broletto built in a minor town.

== History ==
The palace was erected in the 15th century as the broletto of the burgh of Melegnano. It was built opposite the Collegiate church of San Giovanni Battista (Melegnano), almost as if to symbolise the dichotomy between ecclesiastical and civil power.

Over the centuries, it was modified several times: with the last restoration, carried out in the 20th century by the architect Franco Patrini, the external plaster was removed, restoring the brick walls; the Broletto was also flanked by a modern building that houses the administrative offices of the municipality.

== Features ==
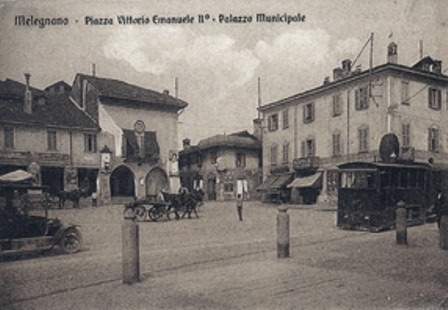
The Broletto before the 20th century restoration

The Broletto stands on the western side of Piazza Risorgimento, opposite the Collegiata di San Giovanni Battista.

According to the typical configuration of the lombard brolettos, the building has a lower floor porch and an upper floor containing a saloon for meetings. Due to modifications over the centuries, today the lower floor remains accessible only from the main façade, while the openings along the side façade have been walled up.

On the upper floor there are windows of different shapes, among which the two ogival openings on the façade and the openings on the side stand out, with frames in terracotta of Renaissance taste.

Under the loggia is a bust marblereo depicting the Melegnanese patriot Giuseppe Dezza.

== Sources ==
=== Italian sources ===
- Rotary club Milano-Melegnano (a cura di), L'arte nel territorio di Melegnano, introduzione di Carlo Perogalli, Milano, Nuove edizioni, 1977, ISBN non esistente, SBN IT\ICCU\SBL\0161506
