= Dezza =

Dezza may refer to:

== People ==
- Giuseppe Dezza (1830–1898), Italian general, politician, and patriot
- Paolo Dezza (1901–1999), Italian clergyman

== Ships ==
- Italian destroyer Pilade Bronzetti, an Italian destroyer and later torpedo boat, renamed Giuseppe Dezza in 1921
