= Broletto, Pavia =

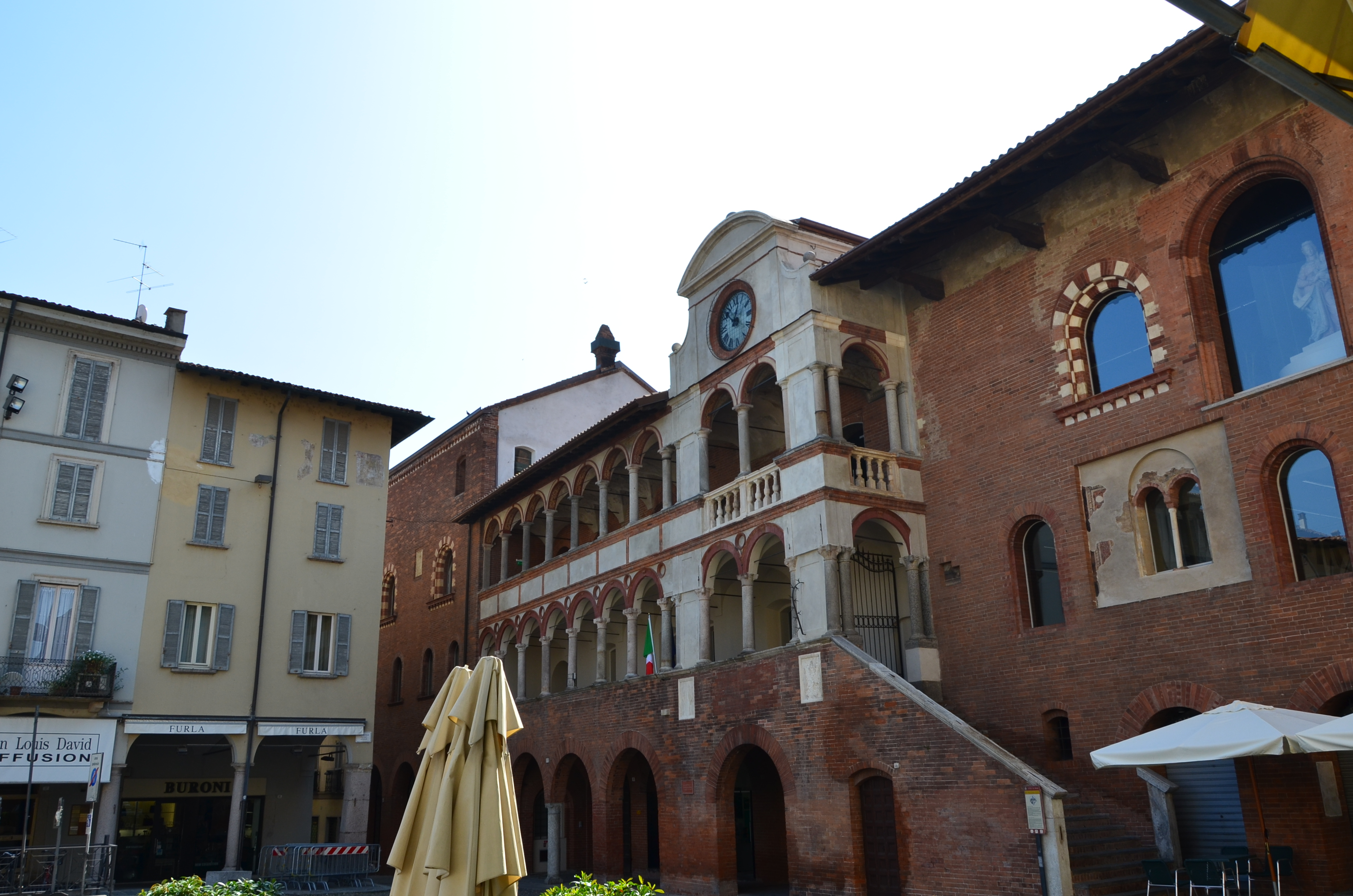
- The façade on Piazza Vittoria.
- Interactive map of the Broletto, Pavia area

General information
- Location: Pavia, Italy
- Coordinates: 45°11′5.39″N 9°9′14.54″E
- Construction started: 12th-13th centuries

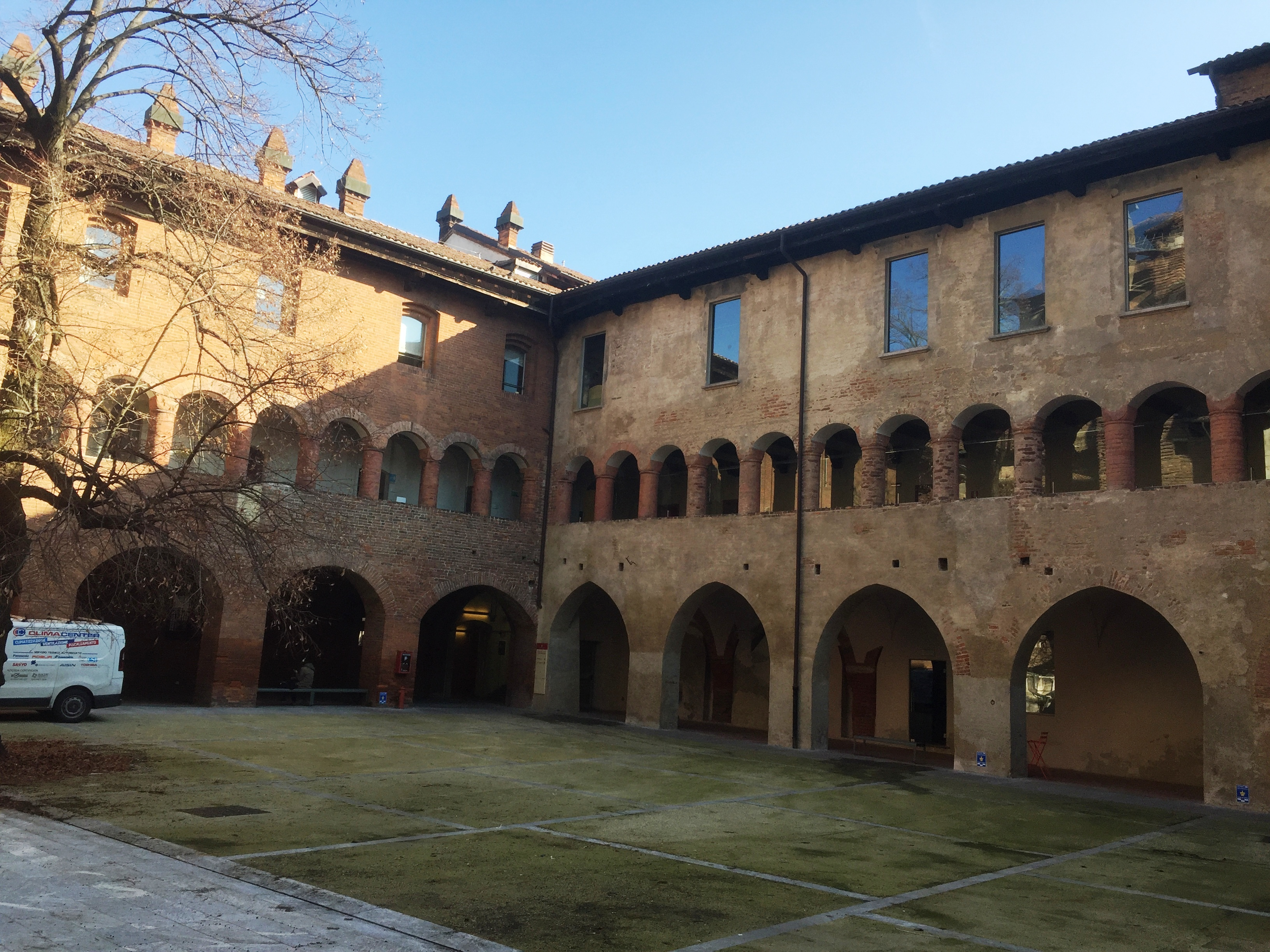
The courtyard

The Broletto or Broletto Palace of Pavia, Italy has for centuries housed the civic government offices of this city found in the region of Lombardy, Italy. The term Broletto refers to a buildings equivalent to the town hall or town assembly.

== History and architecture ==
The palatium Novum, the seat of the municipality, was built above an area that housed domus and other buildings of the Roman age. Evidence of this includes a mosaic (now preserved in the Civic Museums) and other artifacts dating back to the fourth or fifth century found during the restorations carried out between 1926 and 1928

First the south wing of the building was built, immediately followed by the east one, historians believe that this happened around the last two decades of the 12th century, as evidenced by an inscription preserved in the Civic Museums. Later, in just two years (1197–1198), the new building overlooking Piazza Cavagneria was erected.

In 1236 the northern part, overlooking Piazza Vittoria, and the east were added, so as to create a large courtyard inserted within the three wings of the complex. Similarly to other municipal buildings in northern Italy, these structures had arcades on the ground floor, of which there are traces in the façade that closes the courtyard of the broletto to the south.

Around 1264, the broletto began to be divided between "new palace" and "old palace" and "podestà's house". The "old palace" housed the consuls of justice for the Oltrepò and Lomellina, the secret councils, while the "new palace" housed the Council and Credenza of the Hundred Wise Men and the General Council of the Thousand Credenziari. Starting from the first decades of the fourteenth century, a smaller political body was created, the Council of the Twelve Wise Men, which met in the podestà's room. They undoubtedly occupied the court and the portico of the College of Judges.

In the Visconti age the complex underwent several interventions, such as the transformation of some windows (enriched with two-tone frames), the partial closure of the ancient loggias on the ground floor, while, at least from 1398, in the southern wing of the building, the one overlooking Piazza Cavagneria, prisons were created. In 1498 the façade on Piazza Vittoria was redesigned: a loggia was created, divided into two orders of arches interspersed with terracotta roundels. Between 1539 and 1544, the Notai loggia was built in the courtyard, next to which the prison chapel was built in 1556 (later demolished in 1862). Between 1561 and 1564 the staircase of the façade was rebuilt, leading to the hall of the General Council. The palace was the city hall of Pavia until 1875, when the municipality moved its headquarters to the sumptuous Mezzabarba palace, and the broletto became a school building. During the Fascist period it was the seat of the National Fascist Party. After 1945 the building housed some lower secondary schools until 1989, it is currently the seat of the IUSS School for Advanced Studies. Palazzo Broletto is also home to temporary exhibitions of modern and contemporary art.

== Bibliography ==
- Maria Teresa Mazzilli Savini, L'architettura gotica pavese, in Banca Regionale Europea (a cura di), Storia di Pavia. L’arte dall’XI al XVI secolo, III (tomo III), Milano, Industrie Grafiche P. M., 1996.
- Donata Vicini, "Speciales fideles imperii". Pavia e Federico II, Pavia, Comune di Pavia, 1995.
