= Palazzo della Ragione =

Palazzo della Ragione may refer to:

- Palazzo della Ragione, Padua, palace of justice building in Padua
- Palazzo della Ragione, Bergamo, a broletto (place of assembly) in Bergamo
- Palazzo della Ragione, Milan, a historic building and former judicial seat
- Palazzo della Ragione, Verona, on the Piazza dei Signori city square
- Basilica Palladiana, a Renaissance building in Vicenza originally known as Palazzo della Ragione

== See also ==
- Arengario, Italian government buildings of different historic periods
