= Erika Podest =

Panamanian earth scientist

Erika Podest Cardoze is a Panamanian earth scientist who works at NASA's Jet Propulsion Laboratory (JPL). She held an early interest in ecological systems and technological research, going on to earn degrees in engineering and environmental fields. Joining JPL after earning a Ph.D., she has worked on multiple NASA projects, particularly those involving satellite launches and observations of Earth's ecosystems through satellite imagery, including the Soil Moisture Active Passive and NASA-ISRO Synthetic Aperture Radar satellites. She has also spent significant time giving conferences and science presentations in Panama and elsewhere in order to increase the amount of children who choose to pursue scientific study.

== Childhood and education ==
Born in Panama to a native Panamanian mother and an Austrian watchmaker father, Podest spent her childhood developing an interest in nature and technology. Her father took her out to explore nature every weekend, including hiking and swimming and locations such as Gatun Lake and Taboga Island. She attended Embry-Riddle Aeronautical University to earn a bachelor's degree in electrical engineering, before going on to earn a master's degree in applied environmental physics with a thesis on tropical rainforest deforestation and a Ph.D. where she researched the impacts of carbon dioxide on plant growth in high elevation northern latitudes. During her latter graduate work, she started an eight-month internship with JPL in 2002 to study global ecosystems and remained working there after completing her Ph.D.

== Career ==
Once Podest was officially hired by JPL in 2009, she was assigned to the Carbon Cycle and Ecosystems Group to use remote sensing with satellite imagery and radar to determine the effects of climate change on different ecosystems. In 2011, she began working on the Soil Moisture Active Passive satellite mission and was involved in its launch in January 2015. For the ongoing mission, she has been monitoring soil moisture with the satellite to, for one reason, see the impact of climate change on moisture levels globally. In addition, she has been using other satellite data to discover how biodiversity is being affected over time. She later was made a member of the NASA-ISRO Synthetic Aperture Radar (NISAR) mission and acts as an instructor for NASA's Applied Remote Sensing Training (ARSET) program.

To promote children's interest in science, particularly in Latin American countries such as her home, Podest has annually attended the Los Angeles "Adelante Mujer Latina" conference. She also frequently returns to Panama to do tours and presentations there on scientific topics. She presented a conference in 2016 on the subject of climate change to Panamanian government officials, local environmentalists, and a large number of students from across the country. The Panamanian government sponsored a 15-minute video production in 2020 titled "Mentes Curiosas" (Curious Minds) to air on national television and which prominently featured Podest alongside other NASA scientists. In 2023, she collaborated with the United States Embassy in Panama and the Panama American Center to promote the "NASA in Panama" initiative that involved Podest traveling to schools across Panama to promote science and space research to children.

== Awards and honors ==
For her work, Podest was named one of the most "outstanding Panamanians in science" by the government of Panama.
