= GSLV F16 =

2025 Indian satellite launch mission

GSLV - F16
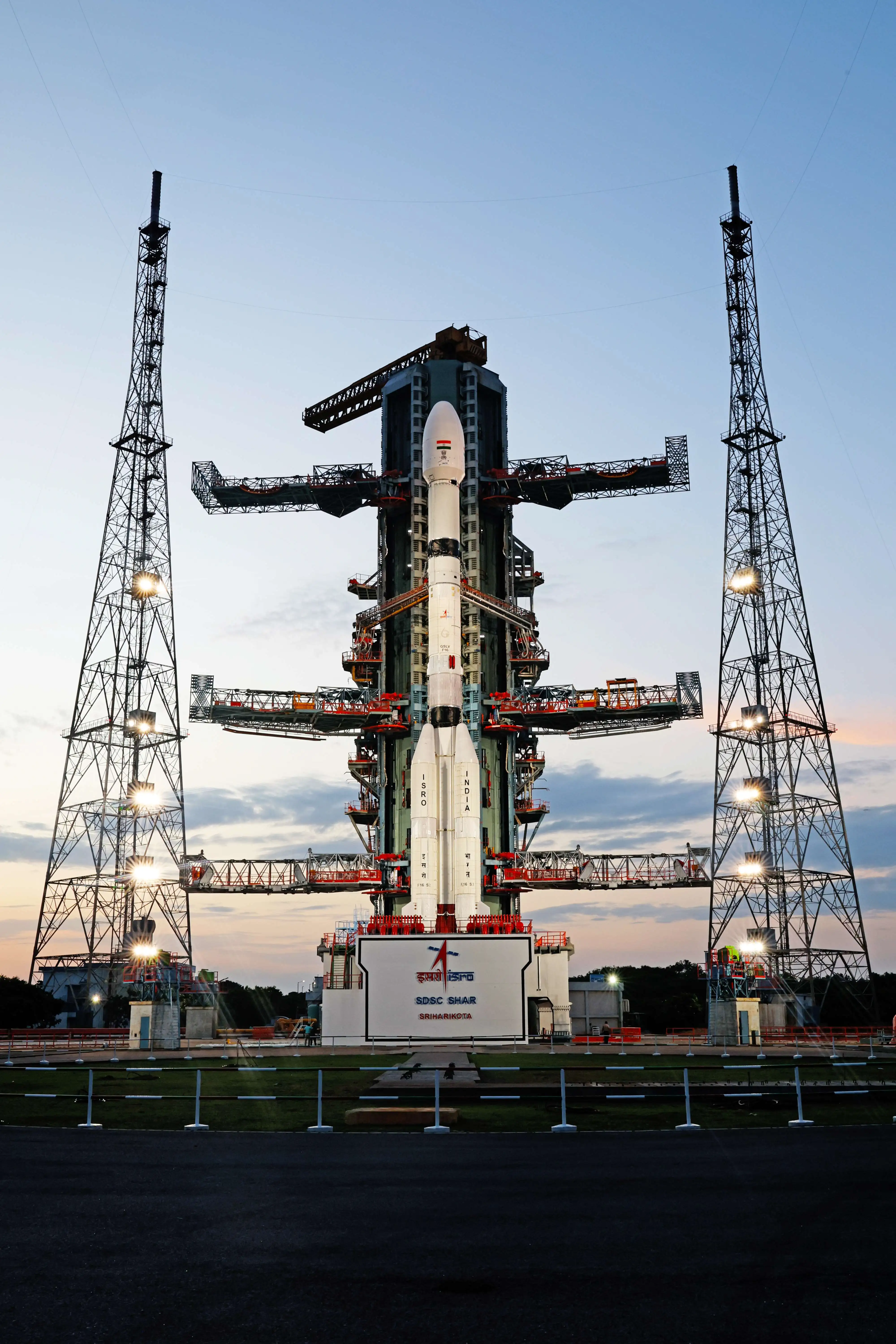
- GSLV-F16 Launch Vehicle at Second Launch Pad

GSLV Mk2 launch
- Launch: 30 July 2025 17:40, IST
- Pad: Second Launch Pad Satish Dhawan Space Centre
- Payload: (India) (United States) NISAR
- Outcome: Success

Components
- Serial no.: F-16
- Boosters: 4x L40
- First stage: S139H
- Second stage: GL40
- Third stage: CUS-15

GSLV launches

The GSLV F-16 was the 18th flight of the GSLV and the 12th flight of Mk2 variant using indigenous Cryogenic Engine (CE). It was the first GSLV flight to Sun Synchronous Polar Orbit (SSPO).

== Mission Overview ==
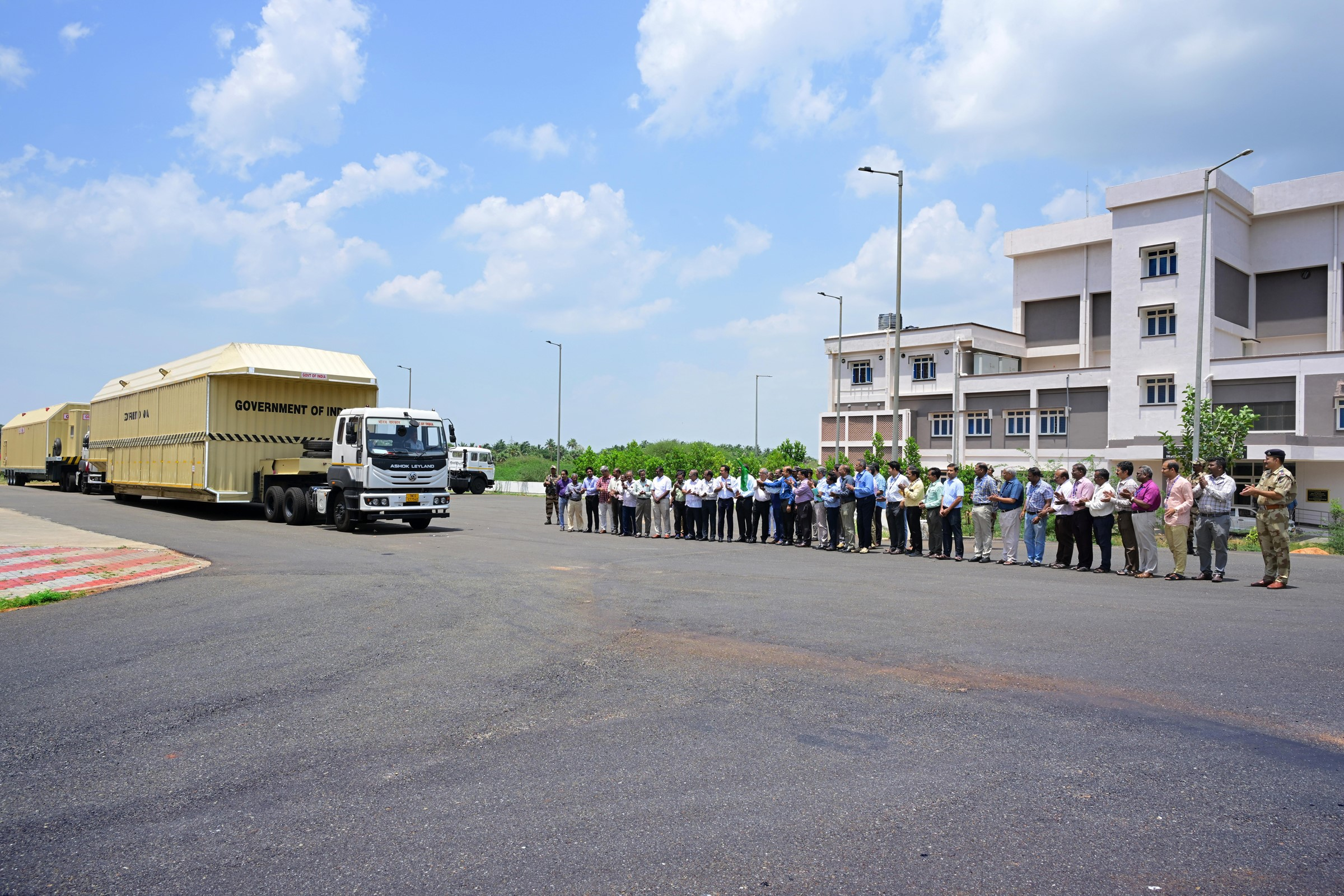
Flagoff of GS2 stage

=== Pre-launch ===
Preparation work for NISAR's launch started in April 2025 with the flag-off of the GS2 stage. Initially scheduled for an early 2024 launch, the mission was delayed after it was decided to apply special reflective coatings to its primary radar reflectors, necessating it being sent back to the US for corrections.

=== Launch ===
NISAR lifted off aboard an ISRO Geosynchronous Satellite Launch Vehicle (GSLV) rocket at 5:40 p.m. IST on the 30th of July 2025. ISRO ground controllers in Bengaluru began communicating with NISAR about 18 minutes after launch, at just after 8:29 a.m. EDT, and confirmed it is operating as expected. It was the GSLV rocket’s first mission to Sun-synchronous polar orbit.The satellite will enter a 90-day Checkout phase and deploy its primary Radar reflector before beginning of its operational life.

== Mission Statistics ==
- Mass: 420 Tonnes at Liftoff
  - Payload weight: 2800kg
- Overall height: 51.73 m (169.7 ft)
- Propellant:
  - Boosters: UDMH+ N_{2}O_{4}
  - Stage 1: HTPB
  - Stage 2: UDMH+ N_{2}O_{4}
  - Stage 3: LOX + LH_{2}
- Propellant mass:
  - Boosters: 42,700 kg (94,100 lb)
  - Stage 1: 139,000 kg (306,000 lb)
  - Stage 2: 39,500 kg (87,100 lb)
  - Stage 3: 15,000 kg (33,000 lb)
- Altitude: 743 km SSO
- Maximum velocity:
- Inclination:98.4°
- Azimuth:
- Period:

This launch vehicle is an 3-stage launch vehicle. The first stage of GSLV was derived from the PSLV's PS1. The 138 tonne solid rocket motor is augmented by 4 liquid strap-ons which is powered by a Vikas rocket engine.

== Payload ==
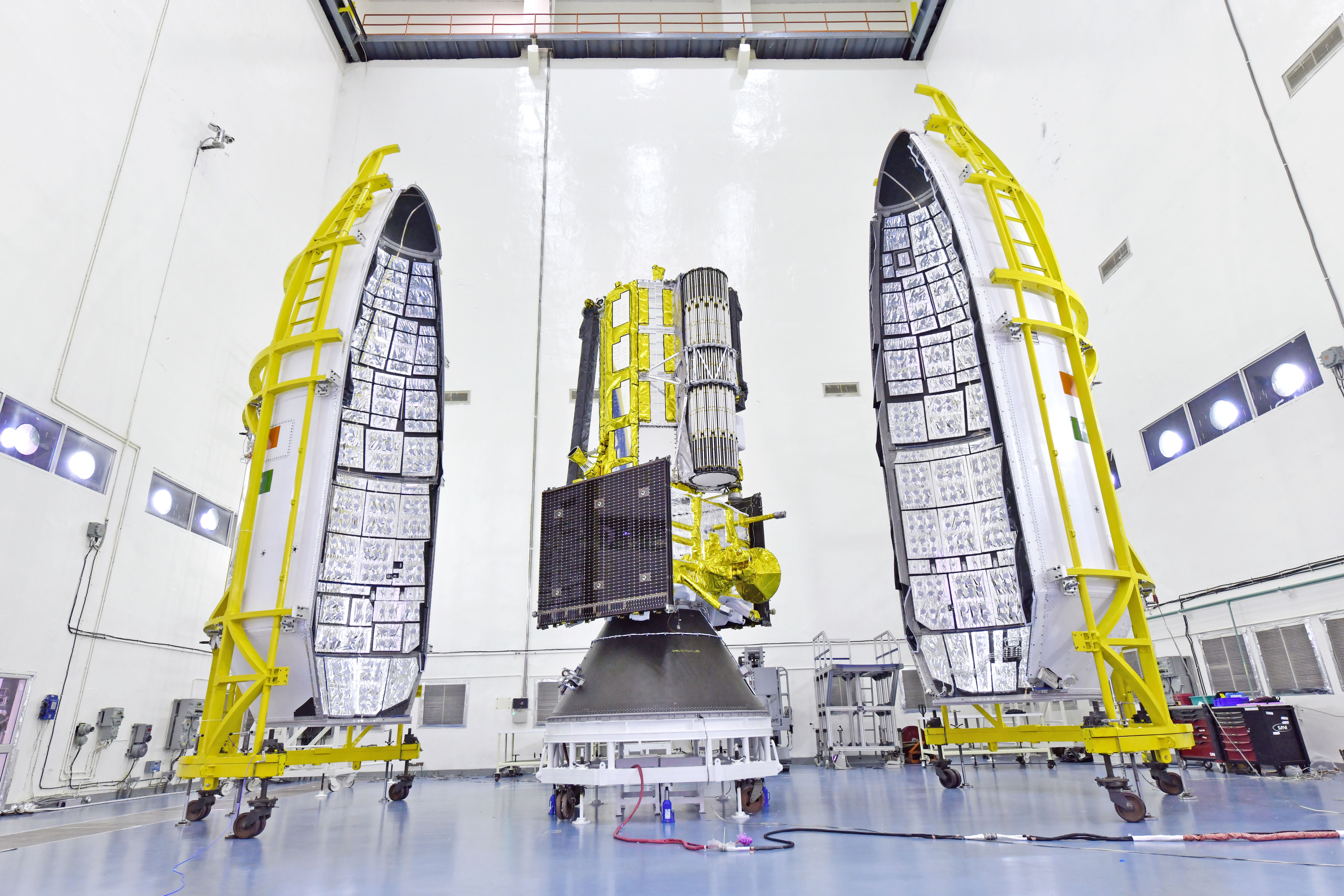
NISAR during Pre-launch processing

The NISAR mission is a $1.5 billion Earth-Observation satellite developed incollaboration with NASA.It will deploy one of the world's most advanced radar imaging systems to monitor Earth's changing systems and natural hazards.

== See also ==
- List of GSLV Launches
- Earth Observation Satellite
