= Pablo Podestá, Buenos Aires =

District in Argentina

Pablo Podestá
- District
- Location in Greater Buenos Aires
- Coordinates: 34°36′S 58°31′W
- Country: Argentina
- Province: Buenos Aires
- Partido: Tres de Febrero
- Elevation: 24 m (79 ft)

Population (2001 census [INDEC])
  - Total: 12,852
  - Density: 9,180/km^{2} (23,800/sq mi)
- CPA Base: B 1657
- Area code: +54 11

Pablo Podestá is a town in Tres de Febrero Partido of Buenos Aires Province, Argentina. It is located in the Greater Buenos Aires urban agglomeration.

== Name ==
The town is named after Argentine actor Pablo Podestá (22 November 1875 – 26 April 1923).
