= NISAR (satellite) =

NASA/ISRO synthetic radar aperture spacecraft

NASA-ISRO Synthetic Aperture Radar (NISAR)
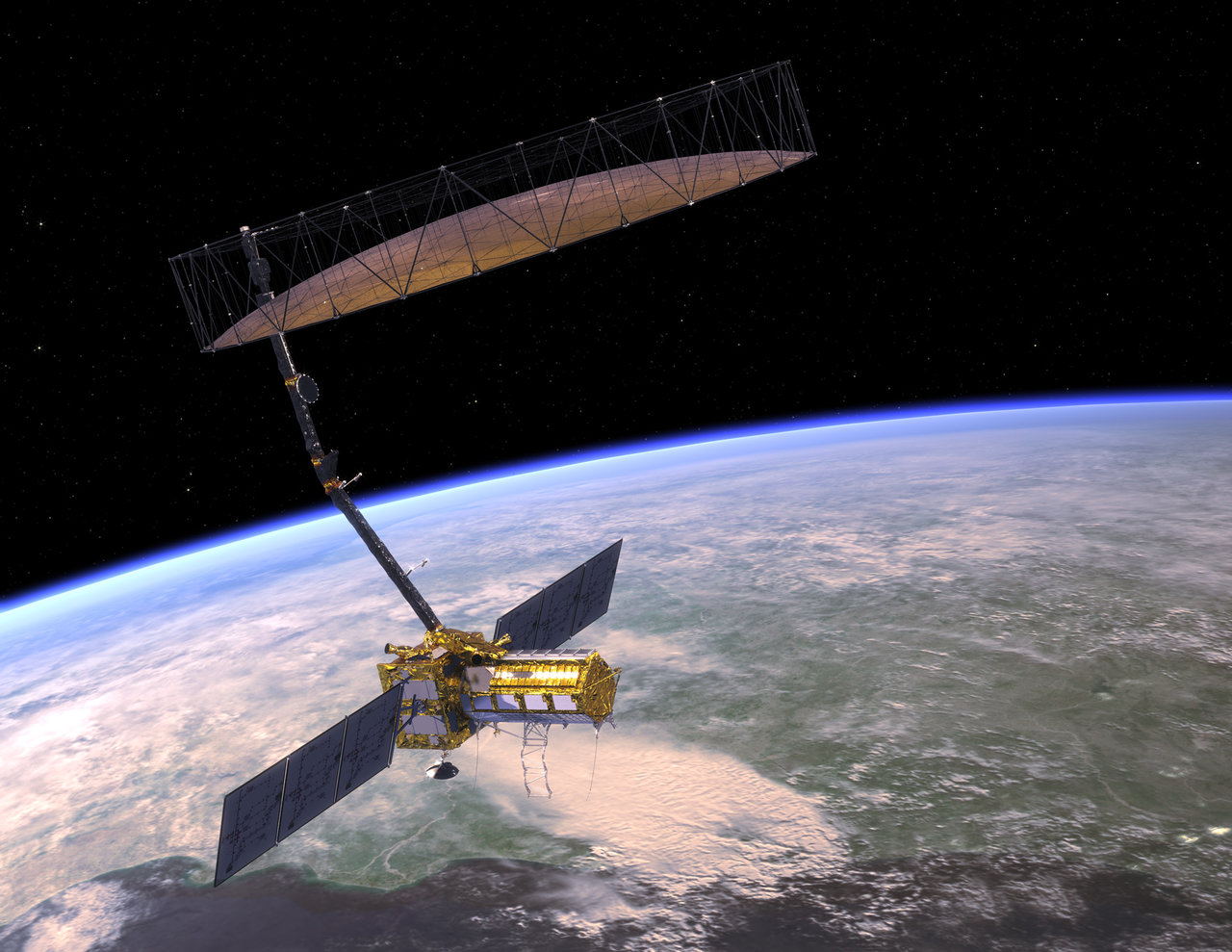
- Artist's concept of the NASA-ISRO Synthetic Aperture Radar (NISAR) satellite.
- Names: NASA-ISRO Synthetic Aperture Radar; NISAR
- Mission type: Radar imaging
- Operator: NASA / ISRO
- COSPAR ID: 2025-163A
- SATCAT no.: 65053
- Website: nisar.jpl.nasa.gov www.isro.gov.in/NISARSatellite.html
- Mission duration: Planned: 5 years Duration: 1 year, 3 months, 16 days

Spacecraft properties
- Spacecraft: NISAR
- Bus: I-3K
- Manufacturer: NASA / ISRO
- Launch mass: 2,393 kg (5,276 lb)
- Power: 6,500 watts

Start of mission
- Launch date: 30 July 2025, 12:10 UTC 05:40pm IST
- Rocket: GSLV F16 (4 meter fairing)
- Launch site: Satish Dhawan Space Centre
- Contractor: ISRO

Orbital parameters
- Reference system: Geocentric orbit
- Regime: Sun-synchronous orbit
- Altitude: 747 km (464 mi)
- Perigee altitude: 747 km (464 mi)
- Apogee altitude: 747 km (464 mi)
- Inclination: 98.5°

Transponders
- Band: S-band; L-band

Instruments
- L-band (24-cm wavelength) Polarimetric Synthetic Aperture Radar; S-band (9.4-cm wavelength) Polarimetric Synthetic Aperture Radar
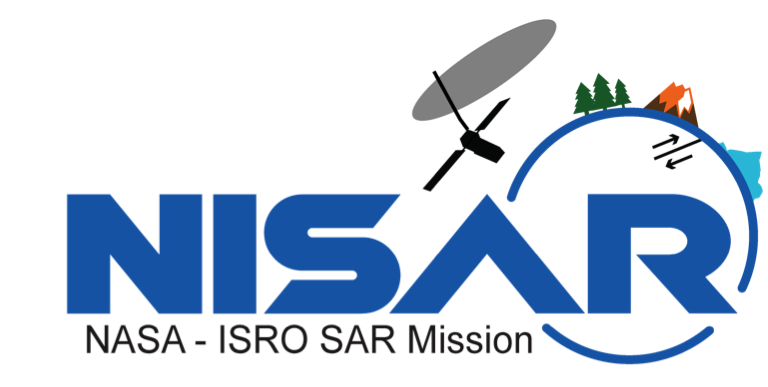
- NISAR mission logo

The NASA-ISRO Synthetic Aperture Radar (NISAR) is an Earth observation satellite (EOS) equipped with dual-frequency synthetic-aperture radar (SAR) jointly developed by NASA and ISRO, launched by ISRO on 30 July 2025 from Satish Dhawan Space Centre. It is the first radar imaging satellite to use dual frequencies. It is being used for remote sensing, to observe and understand natural processes on Earth. With a total cost estimated at US$1.5 billion, NISAR is likely to be the world's most expensive Earth-imaging satellite.

== Overview ==
The NASA-ISRO Synthetic Aperture Radar, or NISAR satellite, uses advanced radar imaging to map the elevation of Earth's land and ice masses four to six times a month at resolutions of 5 to 10 metres (16 to 33 ft). It is designed to observe and measure some of the planet's most complex natural processes, including ecosystem disturbances, ice-sheet collapse, and natural hazards such as earthquakes, tsunamis, volcanoes and landslides.

The mission is a partnership between NASA and ISRO. Under the terms of the agreement, NASA provided the mission's L-band synthetic aperture radar (SAR), a high-rate telecommunication subsystem for scientific data GPS receivers, a solid-state recorder, and a payload data subsystem. ISRO provided the satellite bus, an S-band synthetic aperture radar (SAR), the launch vehicle, and associated launch services.

All data from NISAR is freely available one to two days after observation and within hours in case of emergencies like natural disasters. Data collected from NISAR will reveal information about the evolution and state of Earth's crust, help scientists better understand our planet's natural processes and changing climate, and aid future resource and hazard management.Its instruments are also being used to study the Antarctic cryosphere.

The satellite is three-axis stabilized. It uses a 12 m (39 ft) deployable mesh antenna and will operate on both the L- and S- microwave bands. The aperture mesh reflector (antenna) was supplied by Astro Aerospace. Weighing about 142 pounds (64 kilograms), the reflector features a cylindrical frame made of 123 composite struts and a gold-plated wire mesh and is the largest of its kind deployed in space.

The National Centre of Geodesy facilities at IIT-Kanpur and IIT-Patna also hosted a corner reflector for NISAR. It plays a key role in calibration and course correction of the Nisar satellite's radar during the in-orbit checkout phase.

ISRO's share of the project cost is about ₹788 crore (US$84 million), and NASA's share is about US$1,118 million ($1.118 billion).

== Mission ==
=== Delays ===
The satellite was fully integrated in January 2024 and performed its final testing and analysis in preparation for launch. However, in an interview with the Times of India, Chairman of ISRO Sreedhara Panicker Somanath said that though the GSLV for NISAR will be built by March–April 2024, the satellite was still undergoing tests and they were expecting some delay. Tests found that the large primary radar reflector might face higher-than-expected temperatures when stowed during flight and so it was returned to JPL, its manufacturer in California, to apply a reflective coating to mitigate the risk of overheating. It was the first GSLV Mk II launch to Low Earth orbitand to SSPO

On 15 October 2024, after the completion of all checks and tests, NASA's C-130 took off from Wallops Flight Facility in Virginia to embark on the multi-leg, multi-day journey to India. The flight first stopped at March Air Reserve Base to retrieve the spacecraft followed by strategic stops at Hickam Air Force Base, Hawaii; Andersen Air Force Base, Guam; Clark Air Base, Philippines and reached HAL Airport in Bengaluru, India. By late January 2025, the satellite had finished all preliminary checkout in Bengaluru and was ready to be shipped to SDSC. By May 14 technicians had placed the satellite in a specialized container and transported it about 360 kilometres (220 mi) by truck to Satish Dhawan Space centre, where it arrived following day.

=== Launch ===
NISAR lifted off aboard an ISRO Geosynchronous Satellite Launch Vehicle rocket at 5:40 p.m. IST on the 30th of July 2025. ISRO ground controllers in Bengaluru began communicating with NISAR about 18 minutes after launch, at just after 8:29 a.m. EDT, and confirmed it is operating as expected. It was the GSLV rocket’s first mission to Sun-synchronous polar orbit. The satellite entered a 90-day checkout phase and deployed its primary radar reflector before beginning of its operational life. The orbit is a Sun-Synchronous Orbit (SSO), dawn-to-dusk type. The planned mission life is 5 years.

=== Deployment and commissioning ===
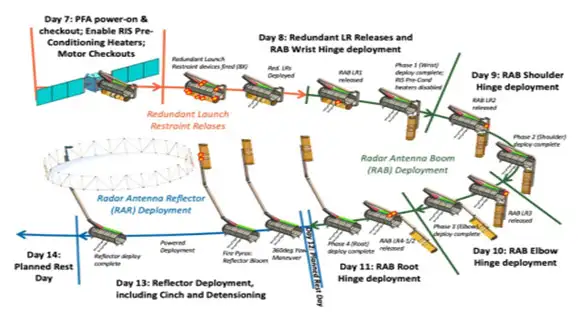
NISAR deployment stages

The deployment process for the spacecraft started on August 9, 2025, with the deployment of the 9-metre (30 ft) long booms first joint. The boom was fully deployed by August 13. 17 days after launch, on August 15, ISRO and NASA mission controllers fired small explosive bolts to unfurl the 12-metre (39 ft) wide drum-shaped primary radar reflector for NISAR. The whole bloom process took 37 minutes and was completed with the locking of cables and activation of motors to fix the reflectors final shape. It then proceeded to raise and circularise its 747-kilometre (464 mi) orbit on August 26. Pre-operational checks were then conducted by both NASA & ISRO teams to validate the health and readiness of all major systems, including the radar payload. Mission controllers anticipated receiving science-quality radar images in September 2025. The spacecraft was expected to begin science operations by fall 2025, about 90 days after launch.

NISAR captured its first SAR images using its L-SAR on August 23rd over Mount Desert Island in Maine and parts of the Forest River in North Dakota. It was officially commissioned into scientific service and declared operational on November 7 2025; capturing its first operational pictures of the Godavari River Delta.It was declared fully operational in January 2026.

== Service ==
NRSC has utilised the first series of NISAR data created in February 2026 to create soil moisture maps of parts covering central India and the Indo-gangetic plains at a 100-by-100-metre (330 ft × 330 ft) resolution. Research data from early December 2025 has been made available at the Bhoonidhi portal. In March 2026, NISAR made observations of the Northwest Pacific coastline, focusing on vegetation around Mount Ranier and Mount Saint Helens as well as the cities of Seattle and Portland. In April, NISAR data on land subsidence revealed that parts of Mexico city sank two centimeters into the ground every month during the dry season, due to heavy urban development and groundwater pumping over the past 100 years. In February 2026, the NISAR mission team released over 100,000 pre-calibration Level 1 to Level 3 L-band data products, with the full global release of calibrated NISAR data products scheduled for July 2026

In July 2026, the L-band instrument imaged glacial ice near Nunatak Zaterjavshijsja in Antartica, displaying local ice levels and crevices near the mountain. To commemorate a year of service, ISRO also released datasets until observation cycle 25 on the boonidhi platform.

== Gallery ==
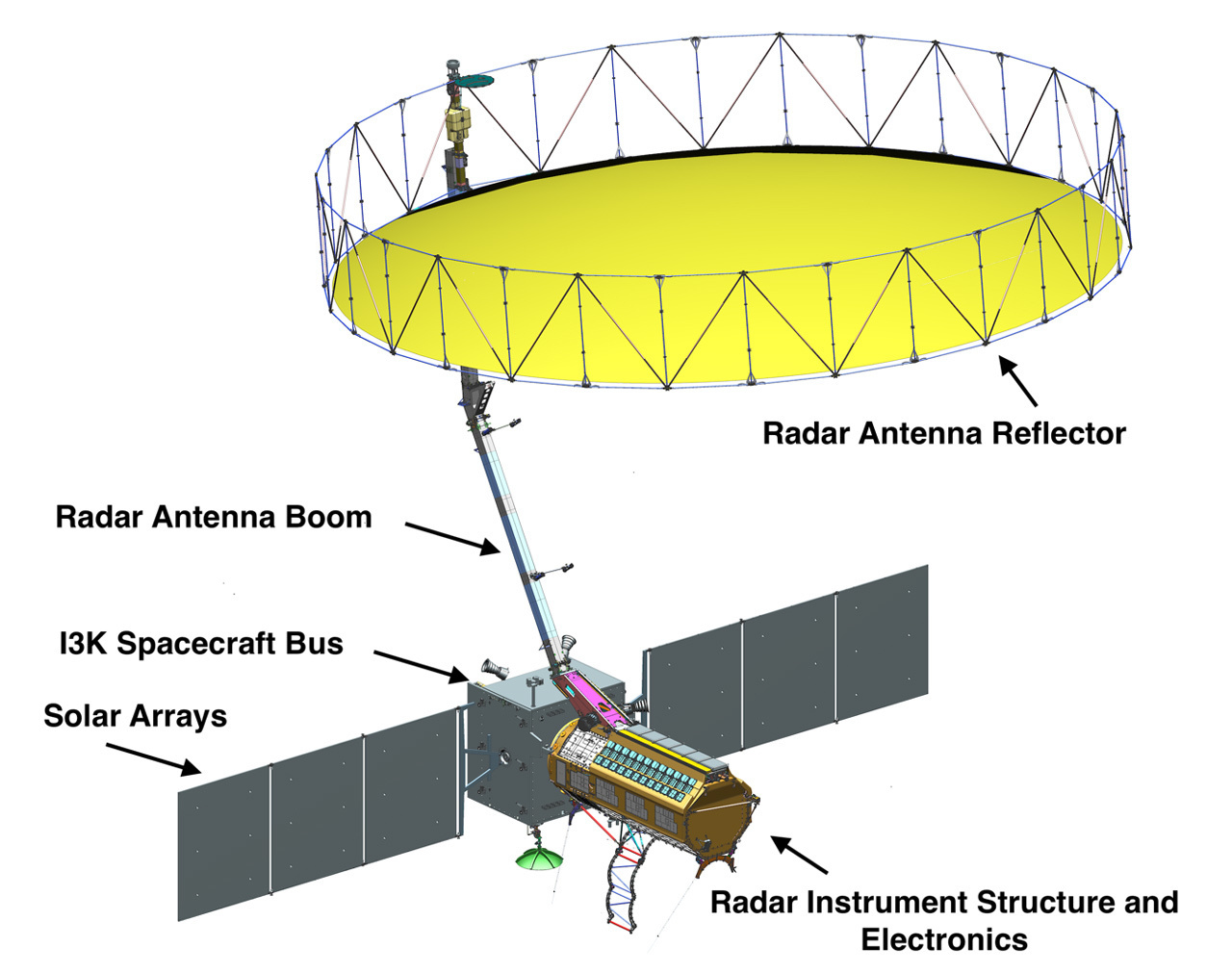
NISAR diagram

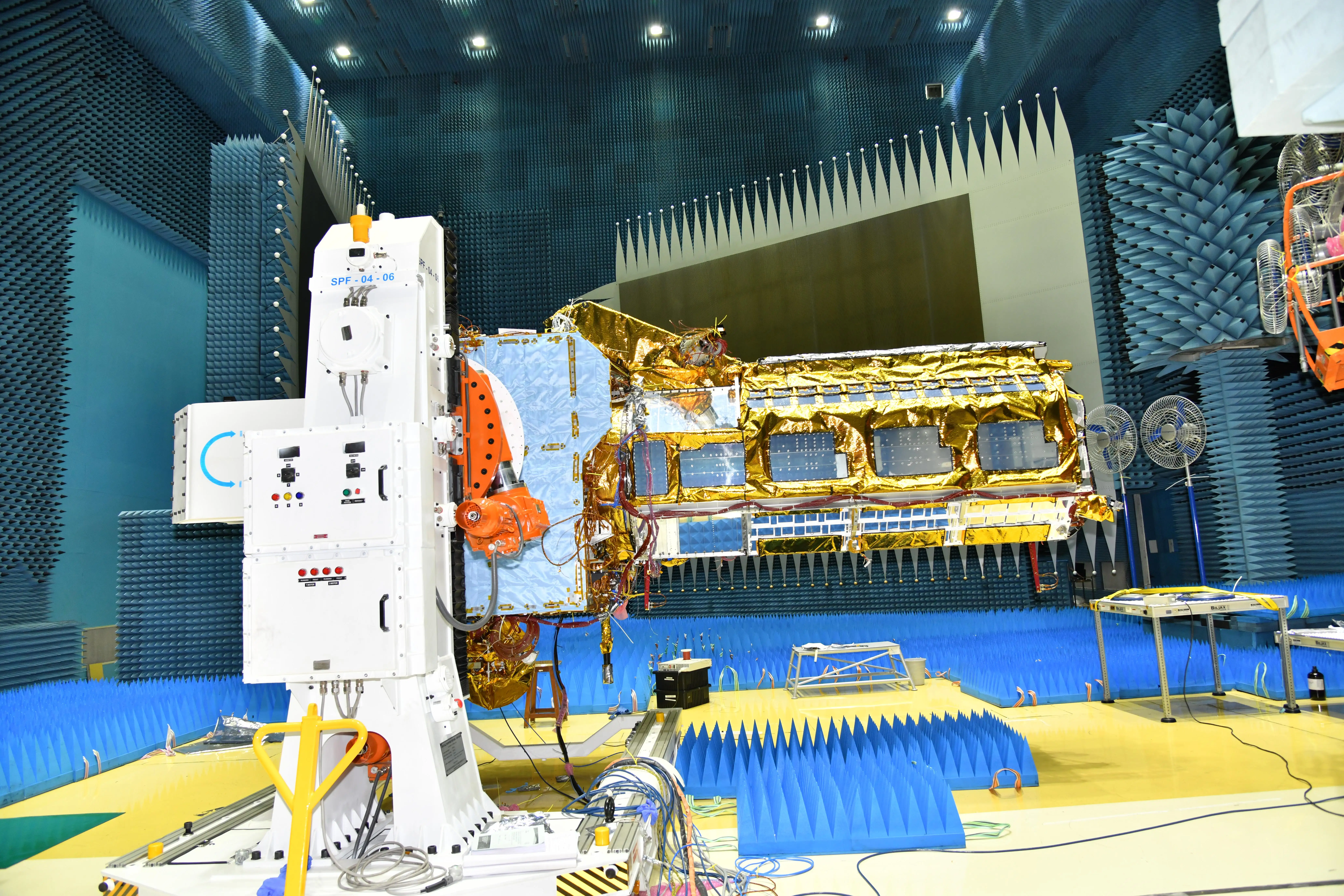
NISAR undergoing tests

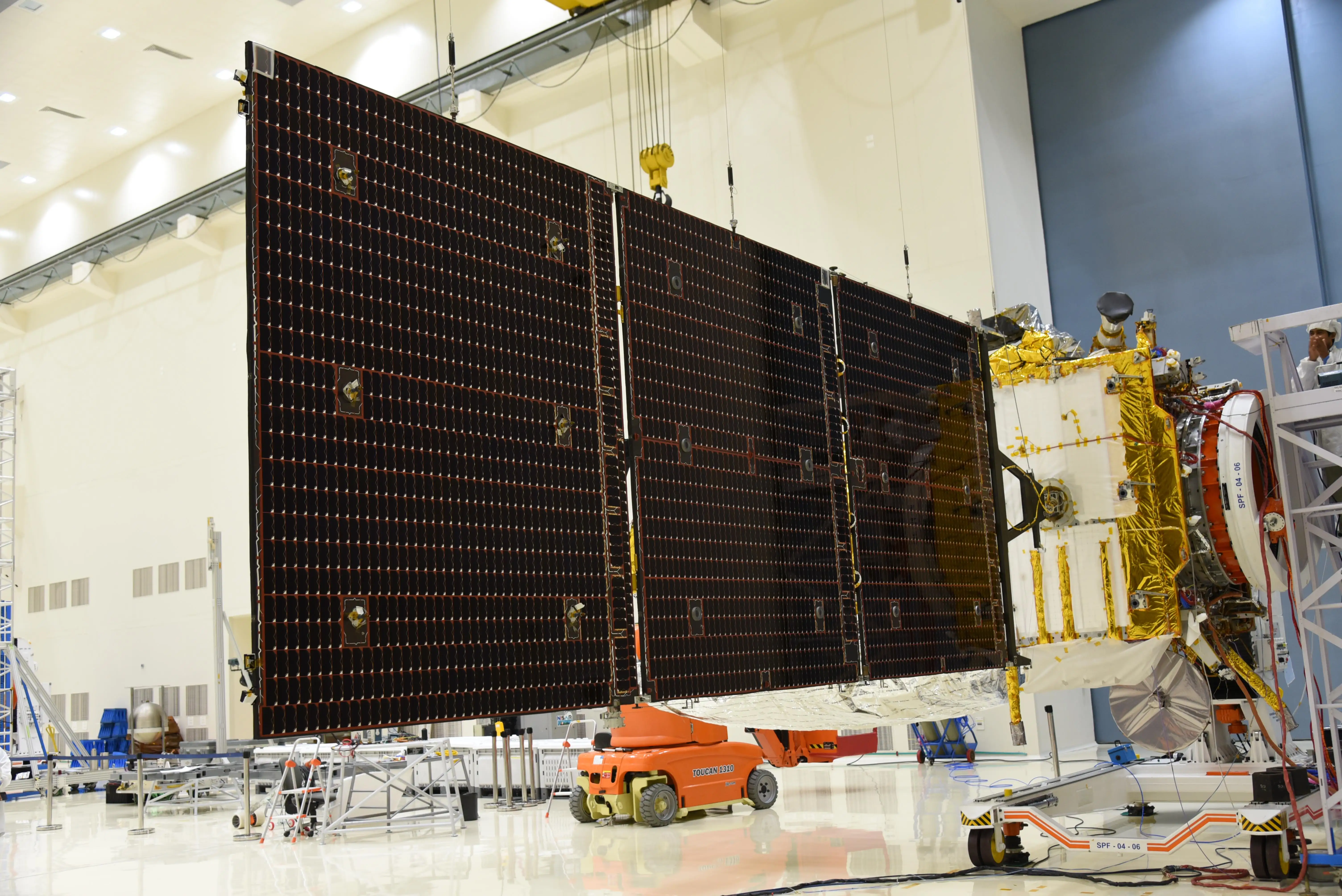
NISAR solar array

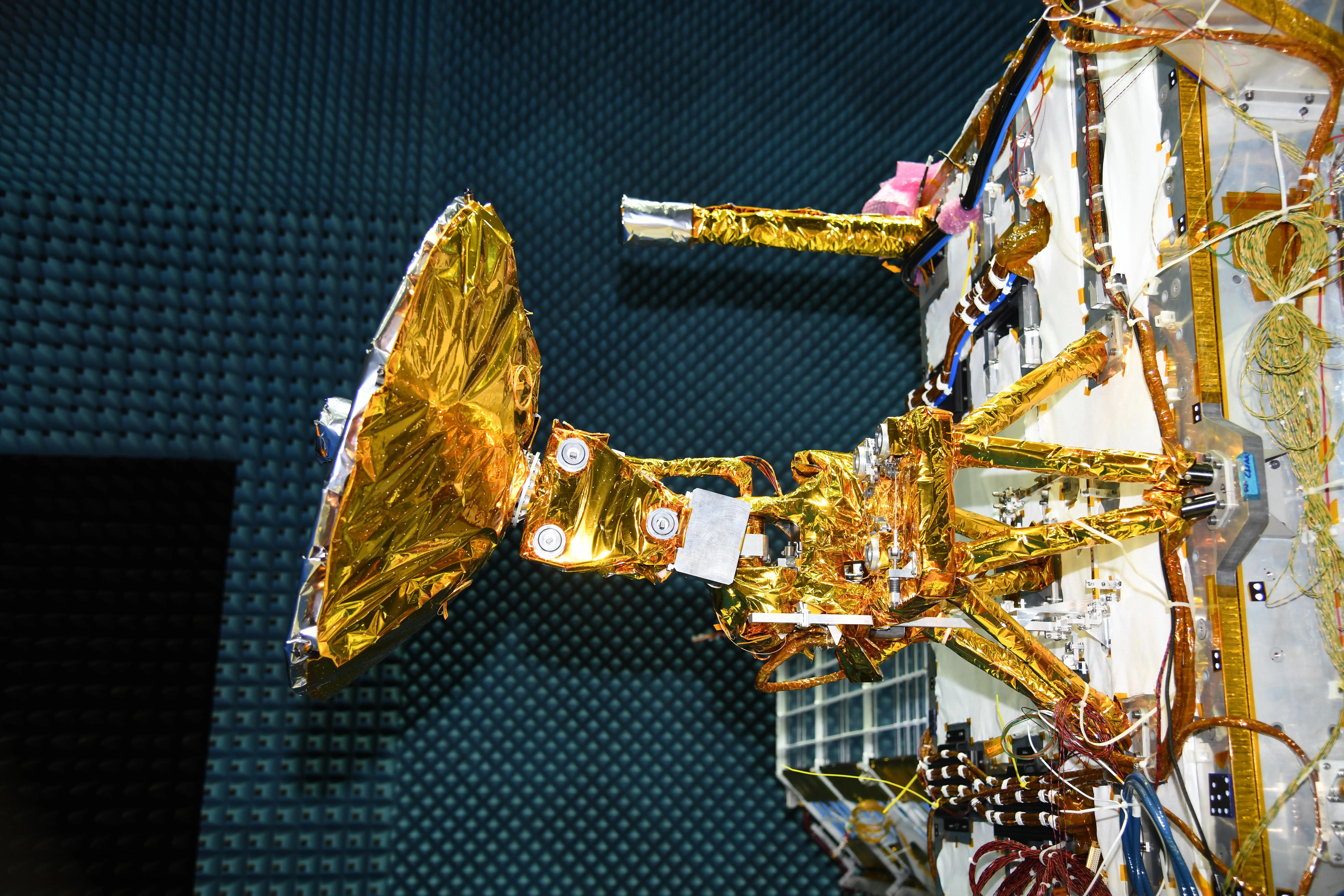
NISAR's DGA antenna

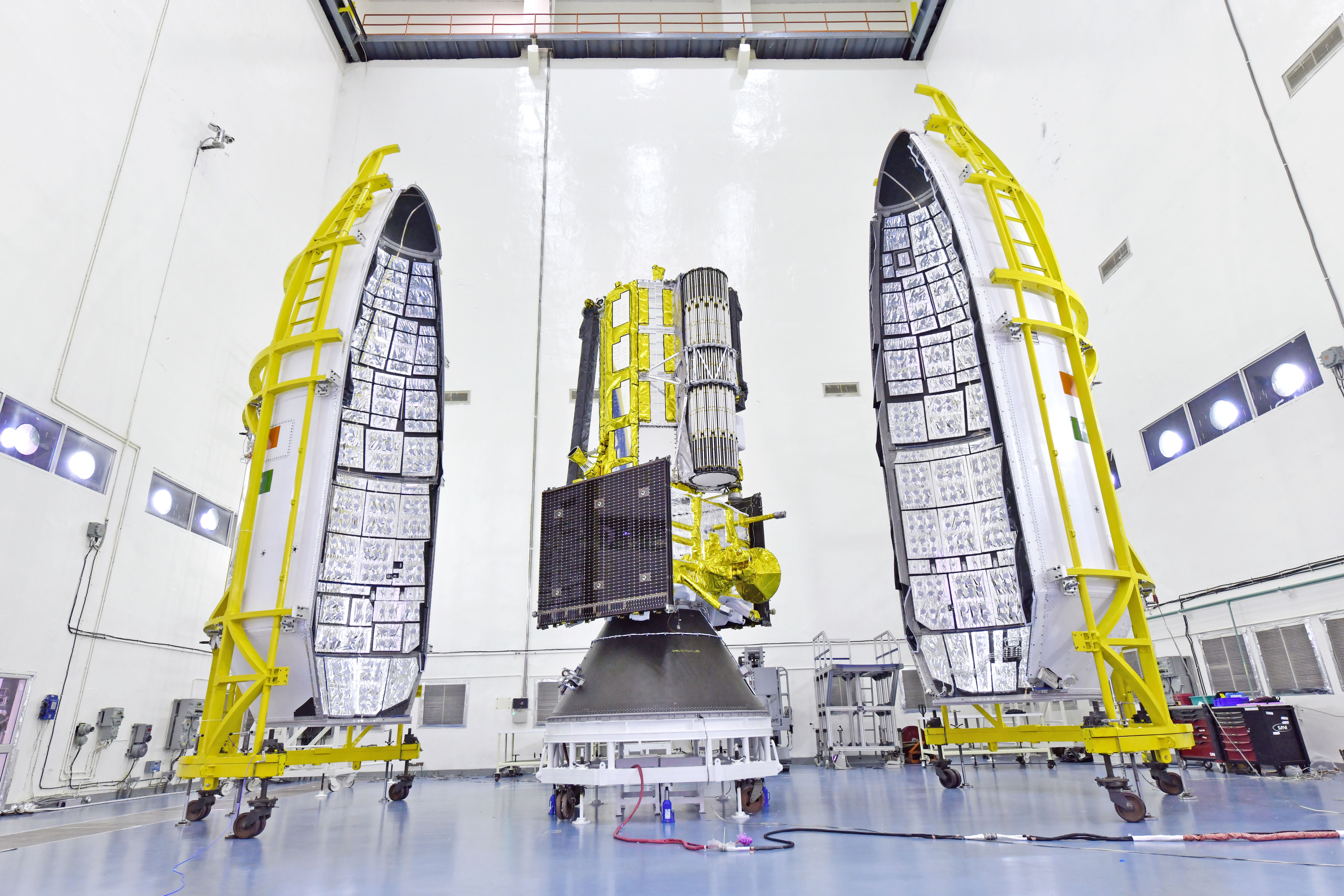
NISAR being Integrated with the Payload Fairing of GSLV F16

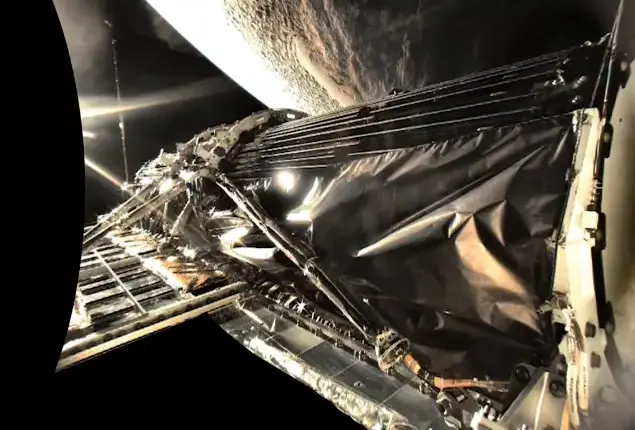
NISAR in space, prior to SAR deployment

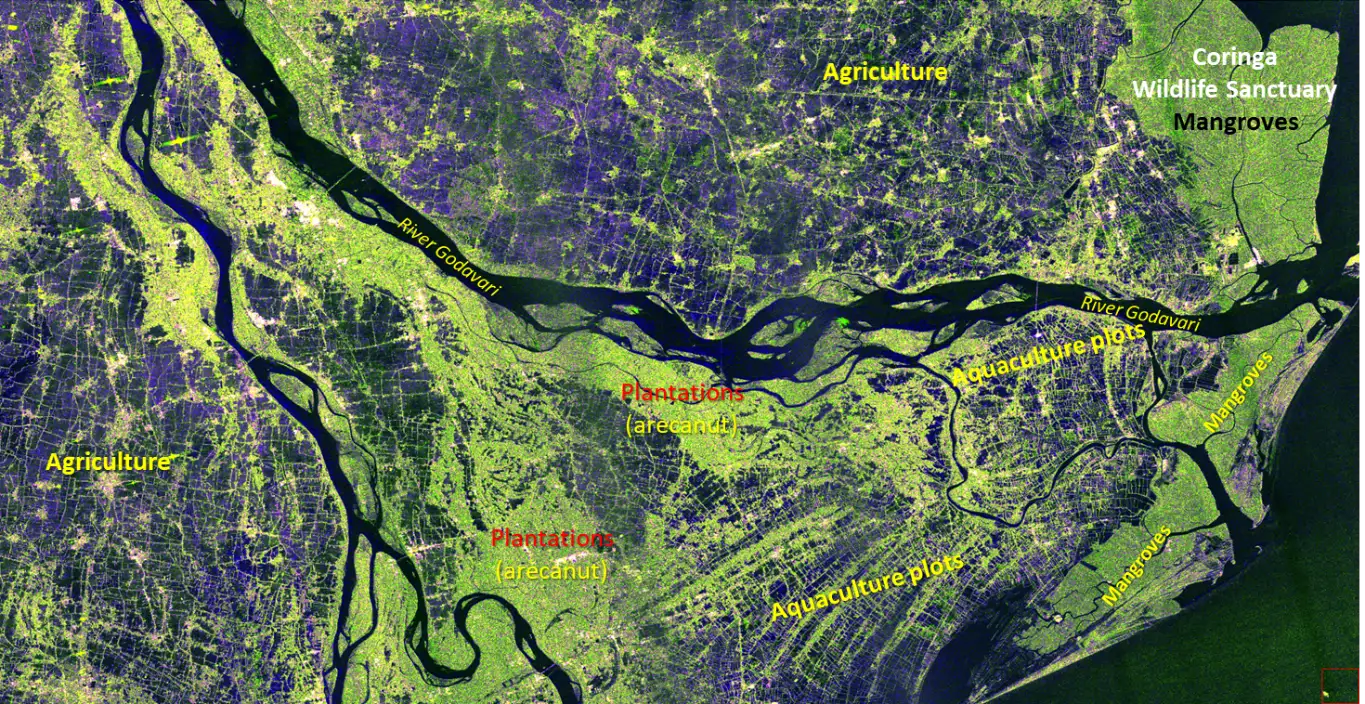
Godavari river delta as imaged by S-SAR in November 2025

== Payload ==
- L-band (1.25 GHz; 24 cm wavelength) polarimetric SAR, produced by NASA.
- S-band (3.20 GHz; 9.4 cm wavelength) polarimetric SAR, produced by ISRO.

== See also ==
- Earth observation satellite
- Indian Remote Sensing
- List of Indian satellites
- Seasat
- Shuttle Radar Topography Mission
