= Pablo Podestá =

Uruguayan-Argentine actor, singer, and artist (1875–1923)

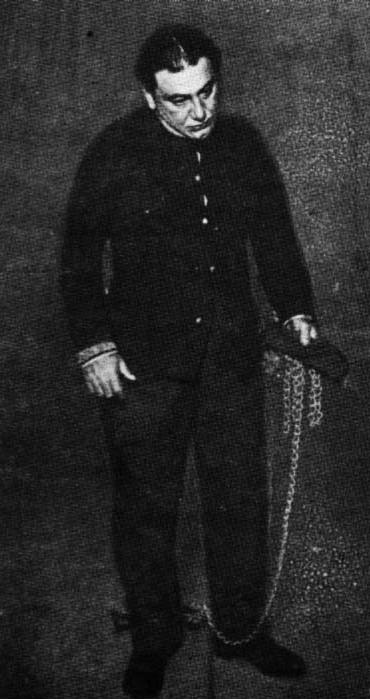
Pablo Podestá

Cecilio Pablo Fernando Podestá (22 November 1875, in Montevideo – 26 April 1923, in Buenos Aires) was a Uruguayan-Argentine stage actor, singer, acrobat, sculptor and painter. He is considered to be one of the most prominent actors of classical Argentina theatre, and along with his brothers, was one of the founders of the Circo criollo (Creole circus). A number of institutions and places are named after him, including a town in Buenos Aires Province, and film awards known as the Premios Pablo Podestá.

== Biography ==
Cecilio Pablo Fernando Podestá was born 22 November 1875 in Montevideo, Uruguay into a family of performers headed by María Luísa Torterolo and Pedro Podestá. The couple had nine children: Luis, Gerónimo, Pedro, "Pepe", Juan Vicente, Graciana, Antonio, Amadeo, and Pablo, the youngest brother. The family were circus performers and when Graciana married Alejandro Scotti, an acrobat and circus impresario, they formed the Podestá-Scotti Troupe. The group began performing in 1878, when Pablo was only three and he performed as a clown. In 1884, they were touring in Buenos Aires, with the Circus of Humberto Primo. Three of the brothers, including Pablo, were billed as the "Condors of the Trapeze", and "Pepé" created the character he would portray to great acclaim for many years, "Pepino 88". The difficulty of finding performers, forced the Carlo Brothers International Circus, who were performing in their own troupe, to ask the Podestá brothers to join with them for thirteen performances including a pantomime about Juan Moreira. After these performances the entire company, including the Carlo Brothers toured in Brazil and Uruguay. In 1886 they were back in Buenos Aires, where they premiered for the first time with a written script, which "Pepé" had prepared. That script became a melodrama and led to an entire genre of "gaucho melodramas", which would be copied by many artists in future years. His script about Moreira was performed in a 42 performance streak in Montevideo in 1889. Later that same year, the brothers premiered at the Teatro San Martin, where Pablo, now 14, was performing in acrobatics and fell from the trapeze, which required a three-month recuperation.

Around 1900, the circus troupe finally dissolved and Pablo followed "Pepé" into acting. In 1901, the Podestá Brothers' Company was premiering numerous works including the play Fumadas by Enrique Buttaro, in which Pablo performed tango dances; La tía de Carlos, by Walter Brandon Thomas, where Pablo successfully played a comic transvestite character. In 1905, Pablo attempted drama rather than comedy in Barranca abajo, by Florencio Sánchez and earned praise. In addition to their performances at the Teatro Apolo, the brothers successfully trained other actors, until around 1906, when Pablo decided to form his own company. While he was working at the Teatro Apolo, he met Olinda Bozán, a child actress. They married in 1908, when she was 14, he was 34; the marriage lasted less than six months. That same year, Podestá performed Muerte civil, by Paolo Giacometti in Montevideo to wide critical acclaim. In 1912, Julio Sánchez Gardel wrote La montaña de las brujas specifically for Podestá, to highlight his expressive body in performance. Podestá ventured into silent films in 1913, starring in Tierra baja with Elías Alippi. In 1914, he released La leyenda del Kacuy by Carlos Schaefer Gallo in which he used his cello to simulate a bird cry. Podestá was talented musician, though he played by ear. He played guitar, cello, and violin and his music compositions inspired his brother Antonio into composing music. His next film, Mariano Moreno y la revolución de Mayo (1915) was directed by the playwright Enrique García Velloso and he made his final film El capataz Valderrama in 1917 under the direction of José Marcos Pallache. That same year, he opened the play La fuerza ciega by Vicente Martínez Cuitiño to the praise of French director Aurélien Lugné-Poe, who lamented that he could not convince Podestá to perform in Paris.

Pablo operated own company until 1919, when his syphilis began to incapacitate him and his mind began deteriorating. He began to suffer from delusions, confusing faces and characters, reality and his acting. On 12 August 1919, the International Variety Artists' Society, a charitable organization run by Carlos Gardel and José Razzano held a benefit event for Podestá. The program featured plays, a comic monologue from Florencio Parravicini, songs from Teresita Maravall "La Zazá", dances by Antonia Mercé Y Luque, a speech by playwright Enrique García Velloso and numerous other tributes. The performance lasted five hours and was hoped to raise funds to pay for his care in the Gonzalo Bosch Sanitarium.

Pablo died 26 April 1923.

== Legacy ==
In 1999, a tango which Pablo wrote was discovered and opened at the Teatro Regio, starring Roberto Carnaghi under the direction of Andrés Bazzalo. In 2011, a play entitled Pablo y Olinda directed by José María Paolantonio featuring the careers of Bozán and Podestá was opened at Teatro Andamio 90. The Premio Pablo Podestá is annually awarded by the Argentina Actors Association to award excellence in acting. In addition, there is a town Pablo Podestá, Buenos Aires named in his honor, as well as several streets in the country.

== Filmography ==
- Tierra baja (1913)
- Mariano Moreno y la revolución de Mayo (1915)
- El capataz Valderrama (1917)

== Sources ==
- Collier, Simon (15 December 1986). The Life, Music, and Times of Carlos Gardel. University of Pittsburgh Pre. ISBN 978-0-8229-7642-4.
- Pellettieri, Osvaldo; Argentino, Grupo de Estudios de Teatro (1 January 2001). De Totó a Sandrini: del cómico italiano al "actor nacional" argentino. Editorial Galerna. ISBN 978-950-556-419-4.
- Pellettieri, Osvaldo (2002). La emancipación cultural (1884 - 1930) (in Spanish) (1 ed.). Buenos Aires: Galerna [u.a.] ISBN 950-556-437-6.
