= Palazzo Pretorio, Lucca =

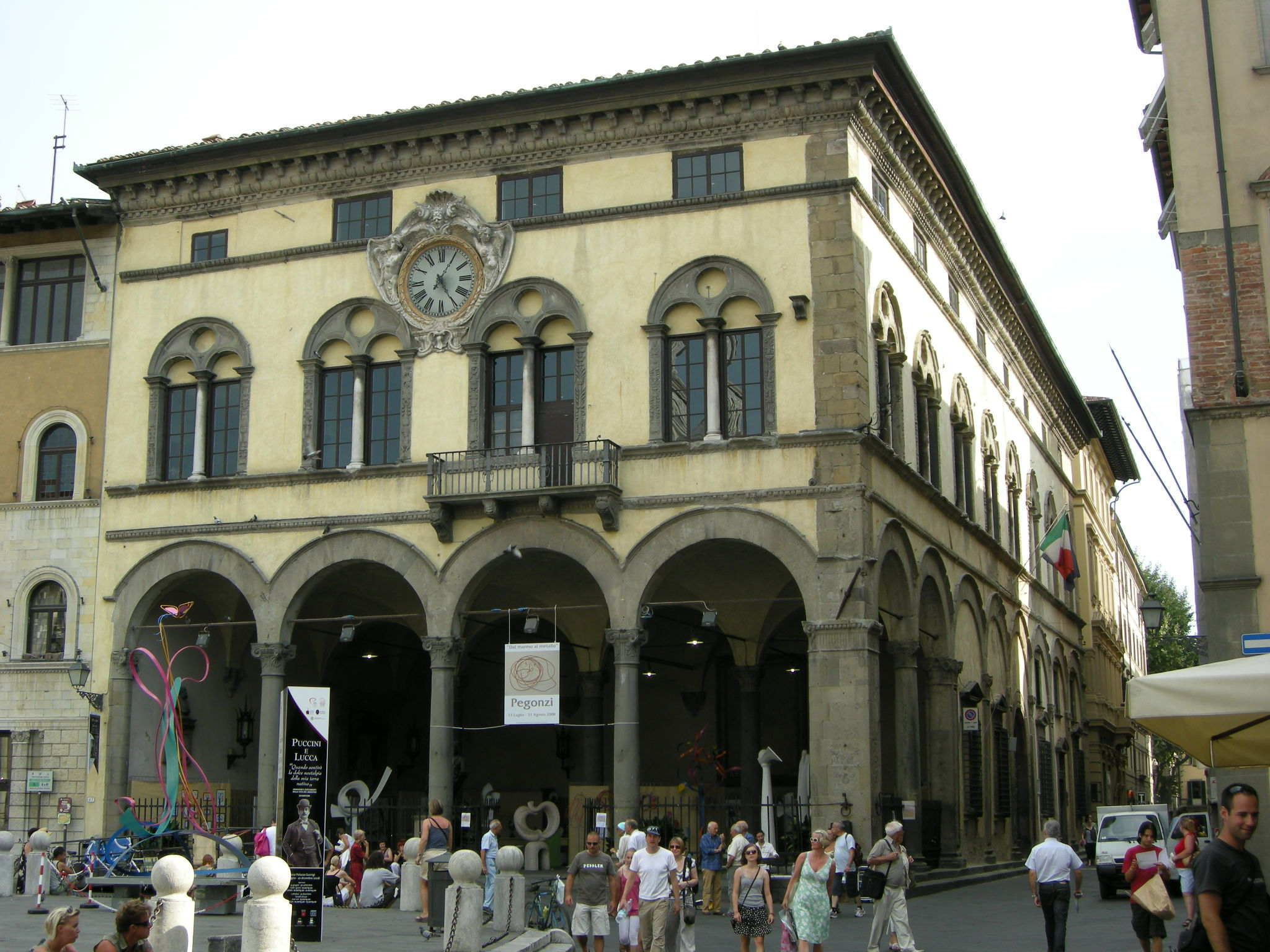
Palazzo Pretorio

The Palazzo Pretoria is a Renaissance-style civic office building, built mainly during 16th-centuries, located in the Piazza San Michele of central Lucca, region of Tuscany, Italy.

It was originally erected in 1370 as a tribunal or Hall of Justice for the Podesta. In 1492, housing for the Podesta was added to it and finished about 1509. Further additions were made in 1588 by Vincenzo Civitali, who left it in its present form. It is now occupied by the courts of civil law.
