= Palazzo Pretorio =

Palazzo Pretorio may refer to:

- Palazzo Pretorio, Arezzo
- Palazzo Pretorio, Cividale del Friuli, Italy
- Palazzo Pretorio, Fiesole, Italy
- Palazzo Pretorio, Gubbio
- Palazzo Pretorio, Lucca, Italy
- Palazzo Pretorio, Palermo, Italy
- Palazzo Pretorio, Prato, Italy
- Palazzo Vilhena, Malta
- Praetorian Palace, Koper, Slovenia
