= Arengario (Monza) =

Coordinates: 45°35′04″N 9°16′31″E

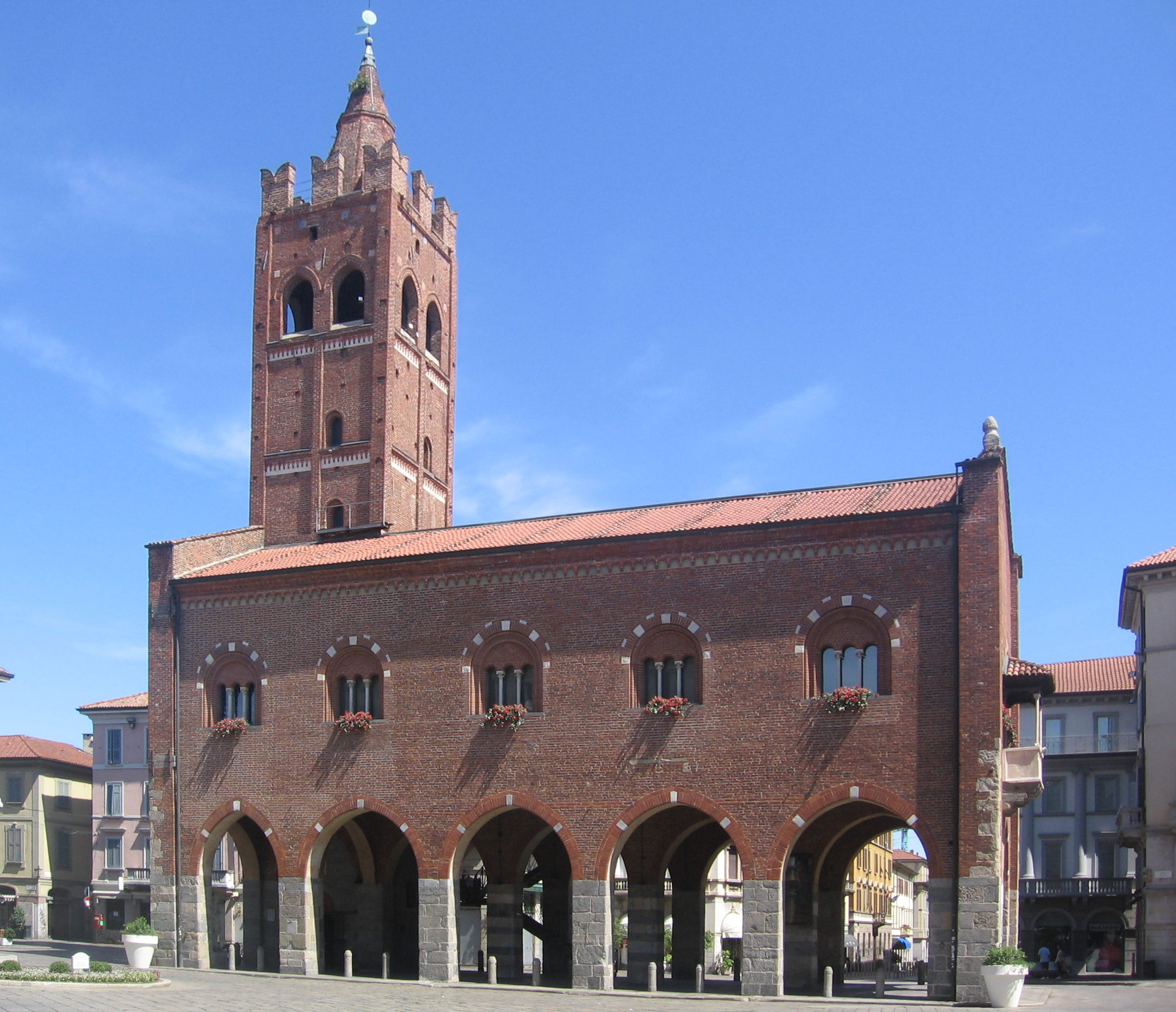
- Arengario of Monza.

General information
- Location: Monza, Italy
- Construction started: 13th century
- Completed: June 1293
- Client: Pietro Visconti, Podestà of Monza,

The Arengario is a historic building in Monza, northern Italy. It was built in the 13th century and is named after its original function as the town's "arengario" (i.e., town hall). It is located in the most central square of Monza, Piazza Roma.

Its architecture is clearly inspired by that of the Palazzo della Ragione of Milan, with a portico surmounted by a single upper floor that was used for councils. The side of the building facing South has a small stone loggia (added to the main building in 1330) informally known as "la Parléra" (in Lombard, "the speaking place"), where the commune's decrees were declaimed to the population. In the 14th century, a bell tower was added, decorated with Ghibelline-styled merlons. In the original building, external stairs led to the upper floor; these have been replaced in 1904 with a new stairway inside the tower.

== Photo gallery ==
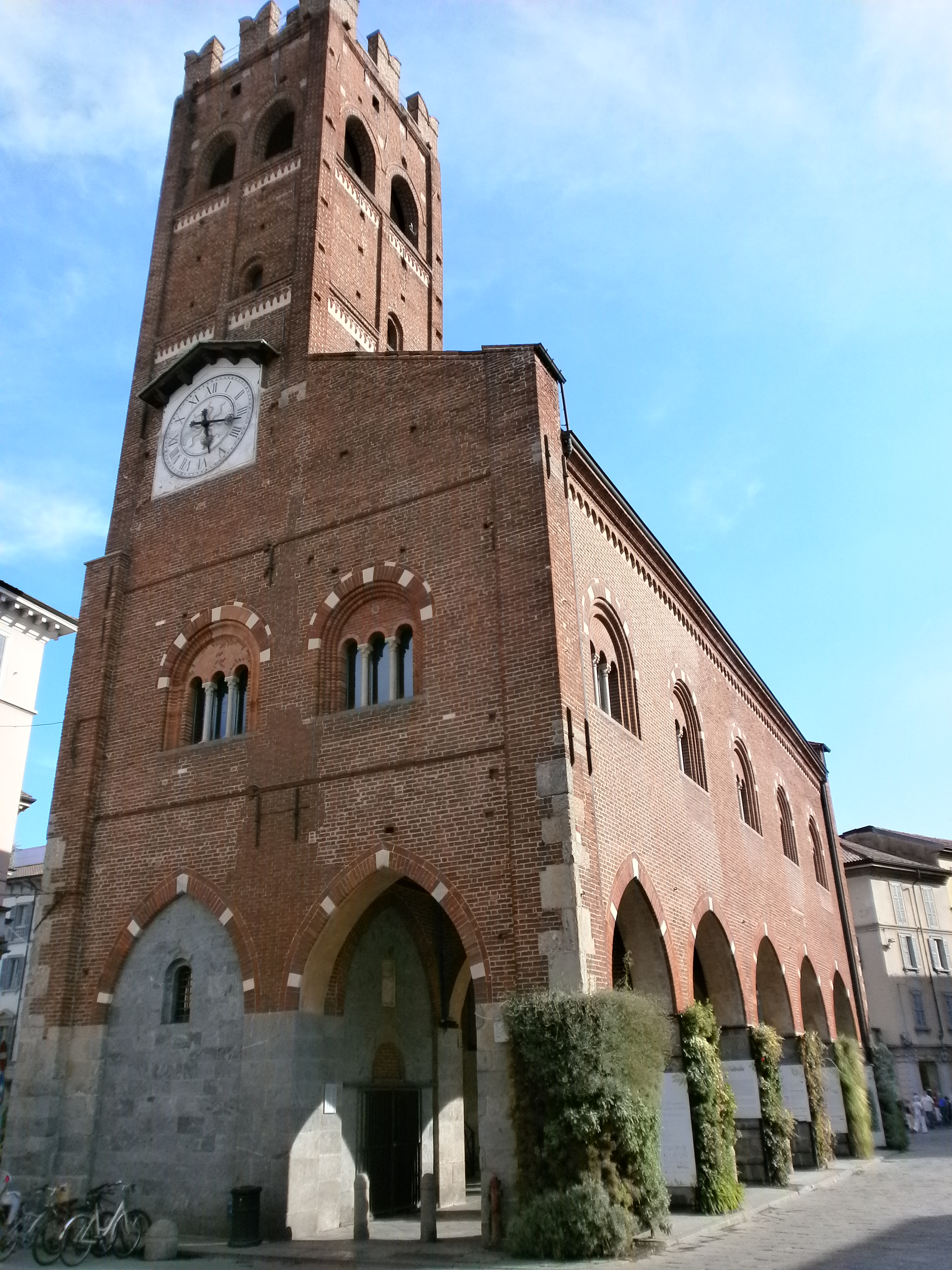
Arengario (nord view)

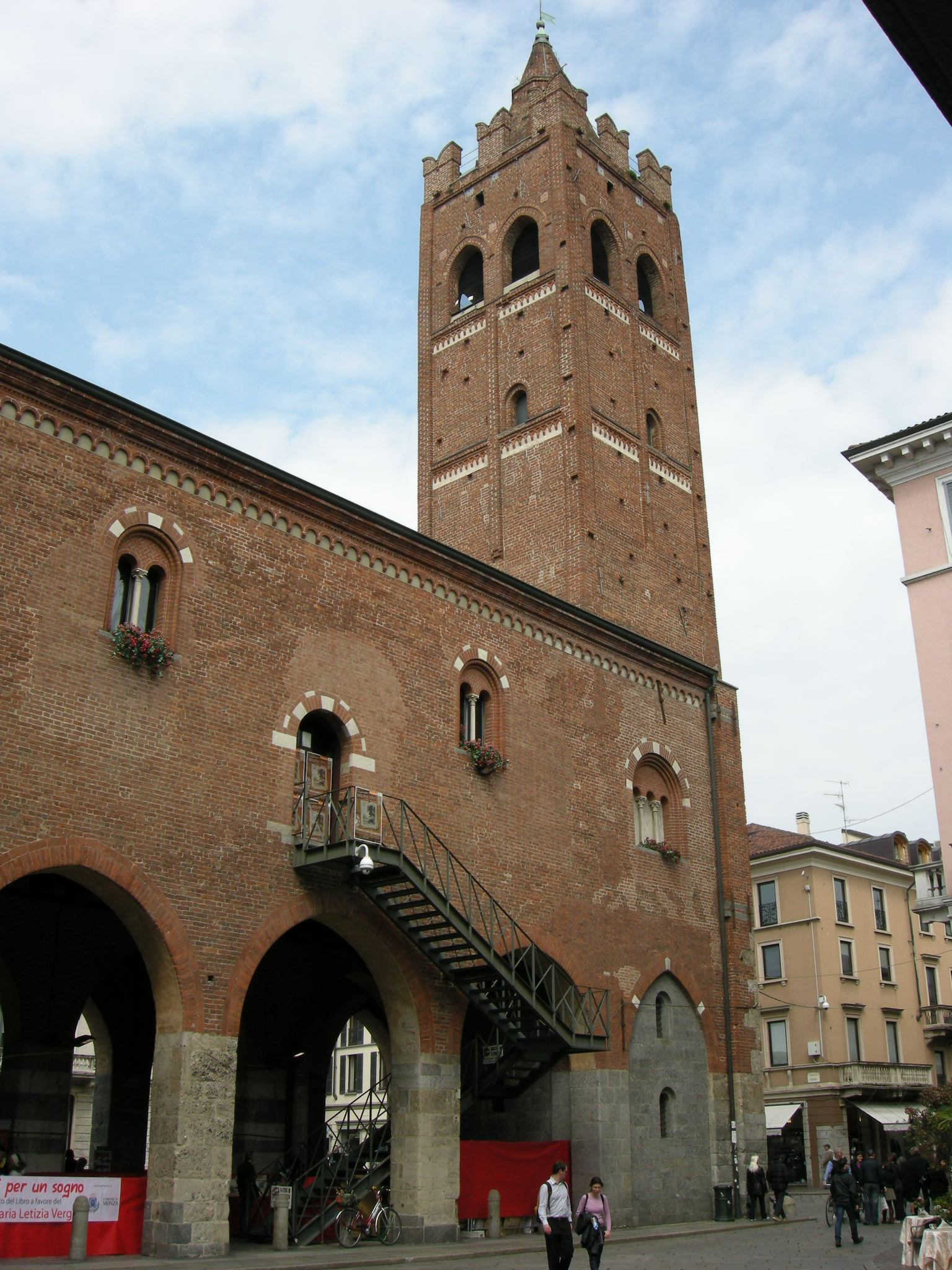
Arengario (est view)

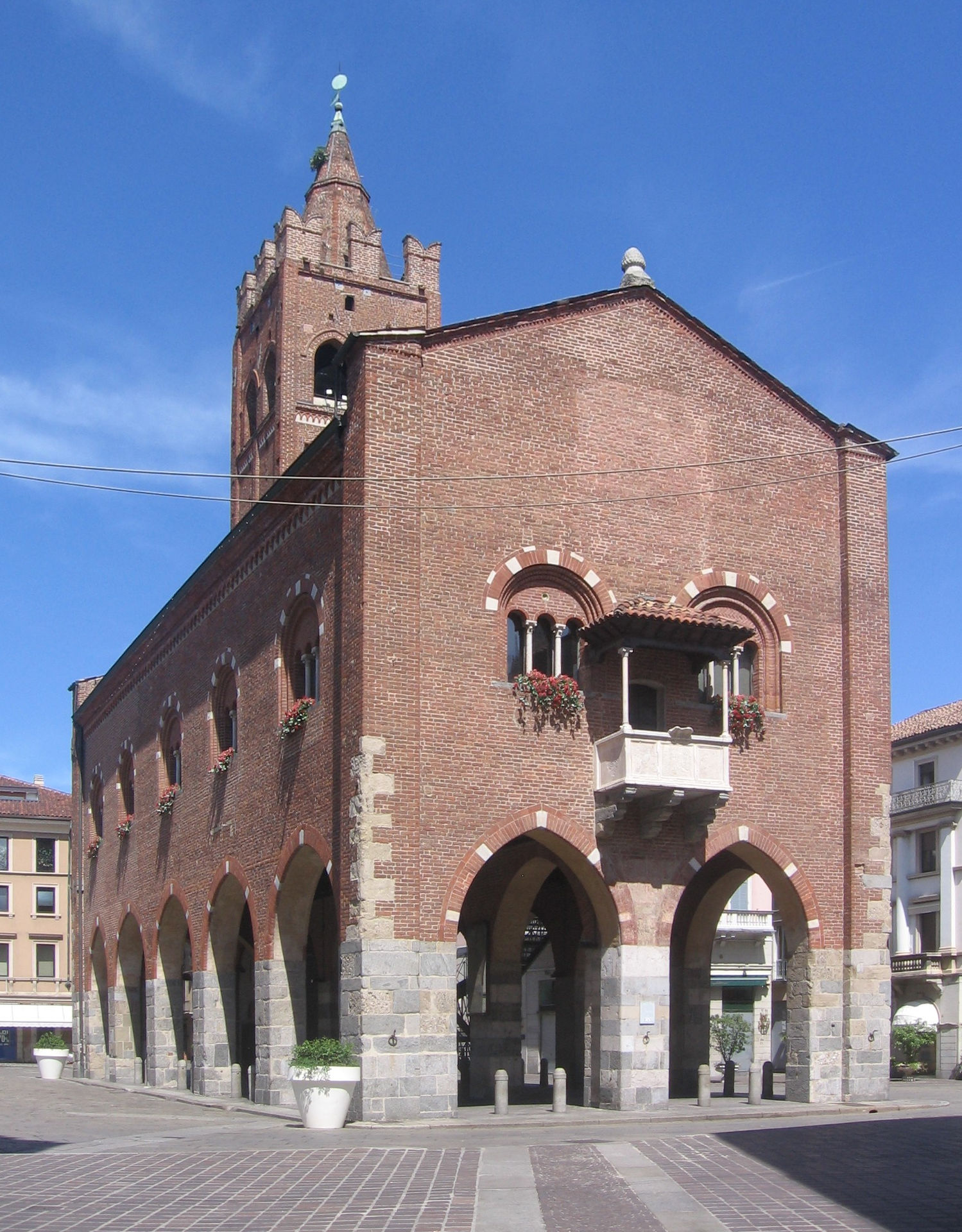
Arengario with Parlera (south view)
