= Giuseppe Dezza =

Italian general and patriot (1830–1898)

Lieutenant General Giuseppe Dezza
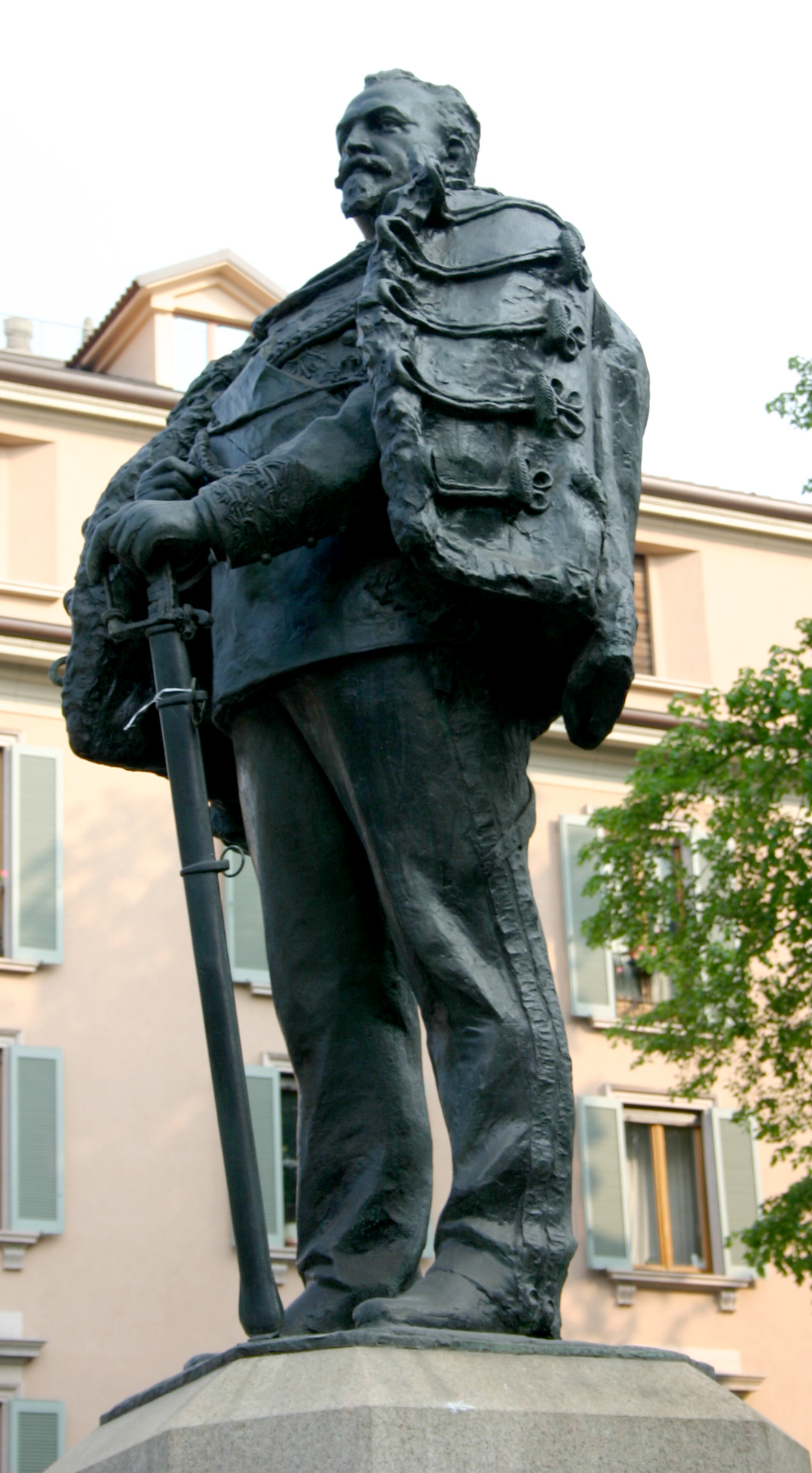
- Monument to Giuseppe Dezza, Milan

Member of the Parliament of the Kingdom of Italy
- In office 20 November 1876 – 2 October 1882

Member of the Senate of the Kingdom of Italy
- In office 20 January 1889 – 14 May 1894

Personal details
- Born: 23 February 1830 Melegnano, Kingdom of Lombardy–Venetia
- Died: 14 May 1899 (aged 69) Milan, Kingdom of Italy
- Party: Historical Right

Military service
- Allegiance: Kingdom of Sardinia; Kingdom of Italy
- Branch/service: Royal Sardinian Army; Royal Italian Army
- Years of service: active: 1848–1895
- Rank: Lieutenant General
- Unit: Red Shirts
- Battles/wars: Italian Wars of Independence (1848–1866)

Giuseppe Dezza (28 February 1830 – 15 May 1898) was an Italian general and patriot.

== Biography ==
Dezza was born in Melegnano, Lombardy. He was a volunteer in the First Battalion of Italian Students of the provisional Lombard government of 1848, and fought in the First Italian War of Independence against the Austrian Empire, which broke out that year.

In 1851 he graduated in engineering and architecture in Pavia. In 1859 he again enrolled as a volunteer in the Cacciatori delle Alpi corps, obtaining the rank of second lieutenant and a Silver Medal of Military Valor. In 1860 he took part in Giuseppe Garibaldi's Expedition of the Thousand, which led to the unification of Italy in 1861, and quickly reached the rank of colonel.

In the newly formed Italian Royal Army he obtained command of the 29th Infantry Regiment, which he led in the Battle of Custoza in 1866. Two years later he became a major general, in command of the Pisa Brigade. In 1872 he was King's Field Lieutenant and, in 1877, lieutenant general, being assigned as commander of the Milano Division. In 1886 he was commander of the VII Army Corps, and later of the XII, VI and III Corps.

In 1895 he was elected member of the Italian Parliament as deputy and, from 1889, was a senator of the Kingdom of Italy.

He died in Milan in 1898.

== Commemoration ==
In January 1921 the Italian destroyer Pilade Bronzetti, which had served during World War I, was renamed Giuseppe Dezza in his honor. Under that name, she was reclassified as a torpedo boat in 1929 and served in the Italian Regia Marina ("Royal Navy") during World War II. After Italy concluded an armistice with the Allies and switched sides in September 1943, Nazi Germany captured her and operated her in the Kriegsmarine as the torpedo boat TA35 until she struck a mine and sank in 1944.
