= Palazzo Comunale =

Palazzo Comunale may refer to:

- Palazzo Comunale, San Gimignano, seat of the civic authority in San Gimignano, Italy
- Palazzo Comunale, Clusone, site of an astronomical clock in Italy
- Palazzo d'Accursio or Palazzo Comunale, former site of administrative offices of the city of Bologna, Italy
