= Piazza dei Signori, Verona =

City square in Verona, Italy

Coordinates: 45.407677°N 11.873476°E

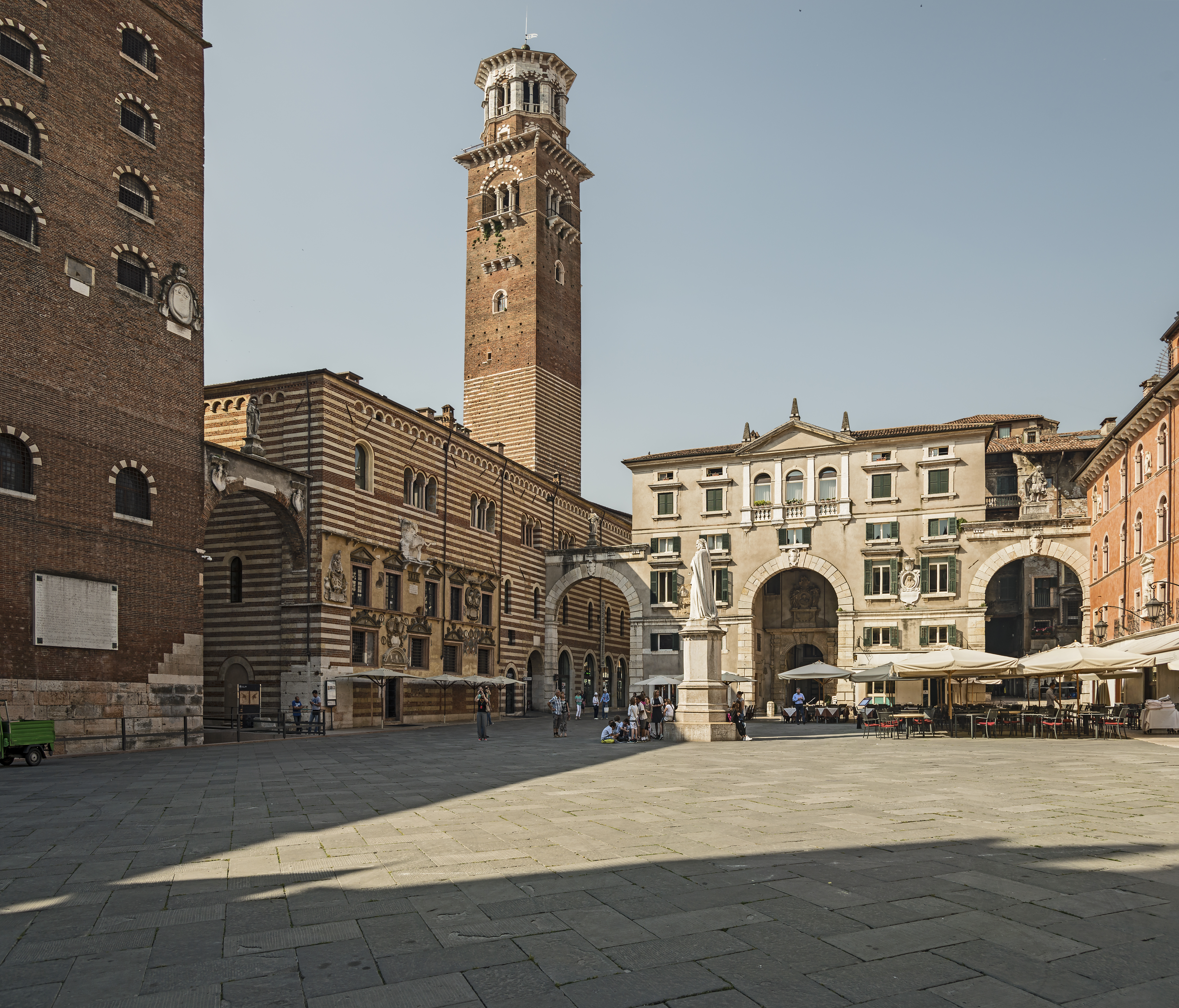
Piazza dei Signori, Palazzo Domus Nova and Palazzo del Comune

Piazza dei Signori is a city square in Verona, Italy.

== Buildings around the square ==
- Palazzo della Ragione, Verona (Palazzo del Comune)
- Palazzo Domus Nova
- Casa della Pietà
- Palazzo di Cansignorio
- Palazzo del Podestà, Verona
- Loggia del Consiglio
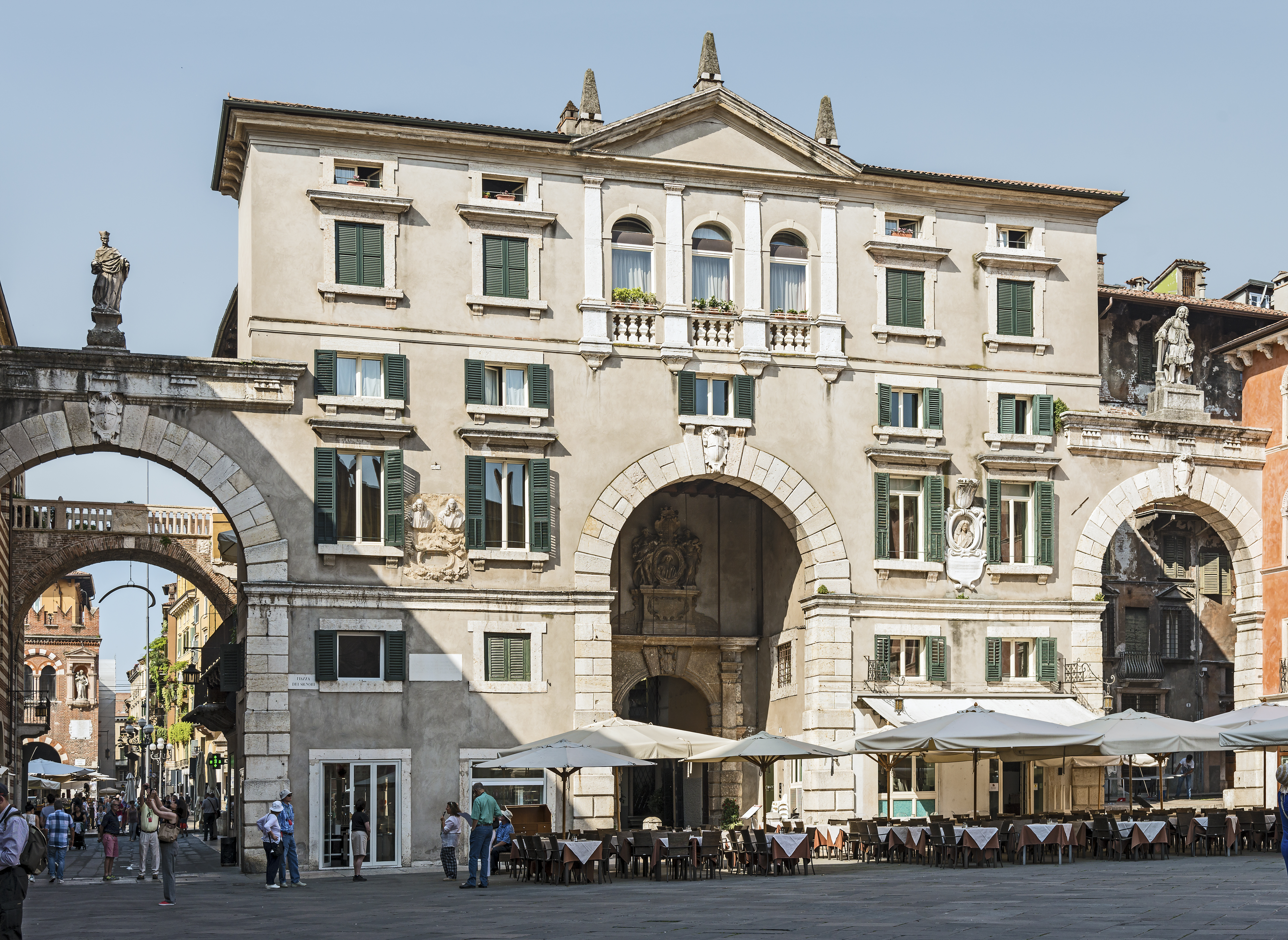
Palazzo Domus Nova.

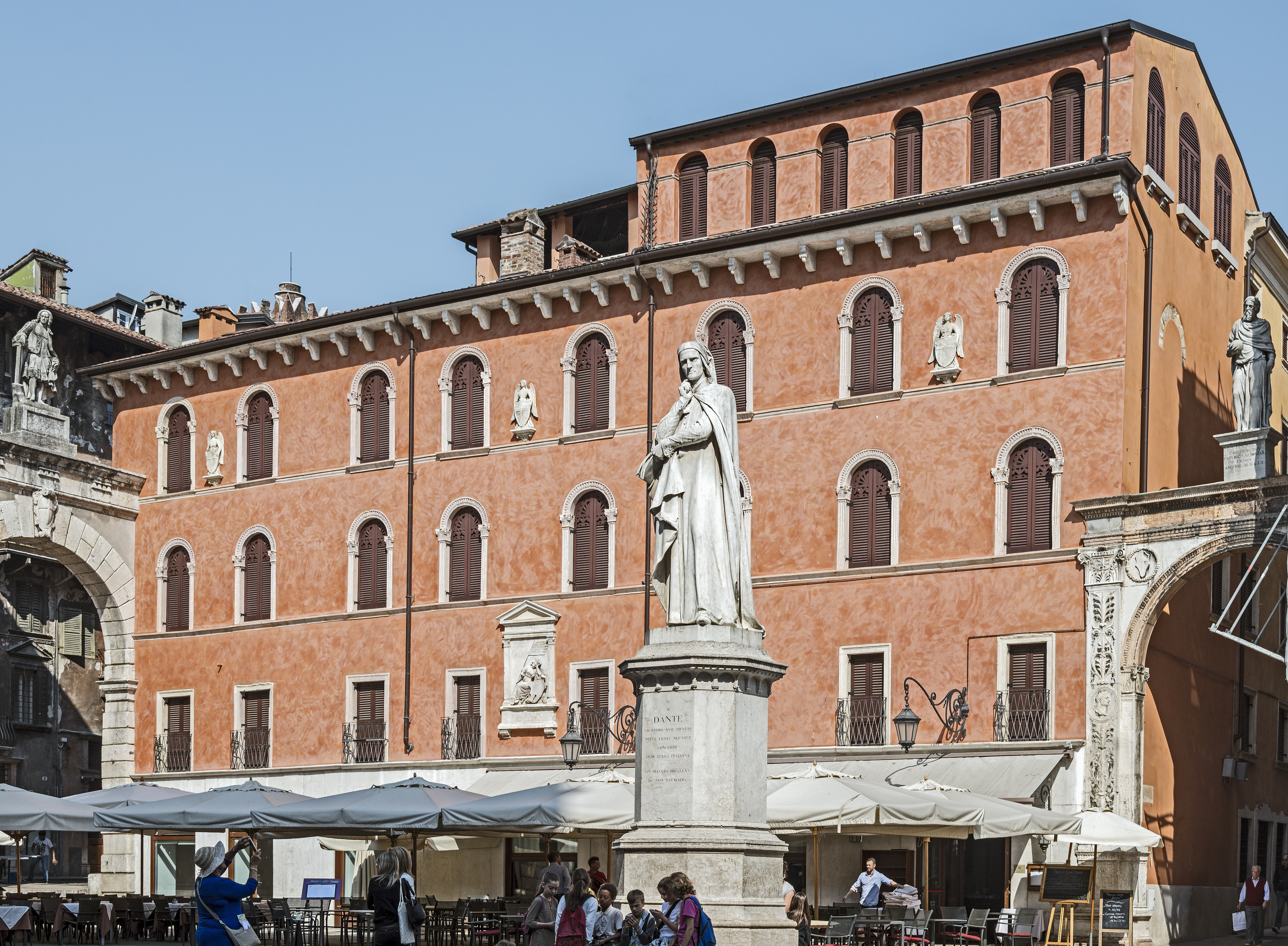
La Casa della Pietà

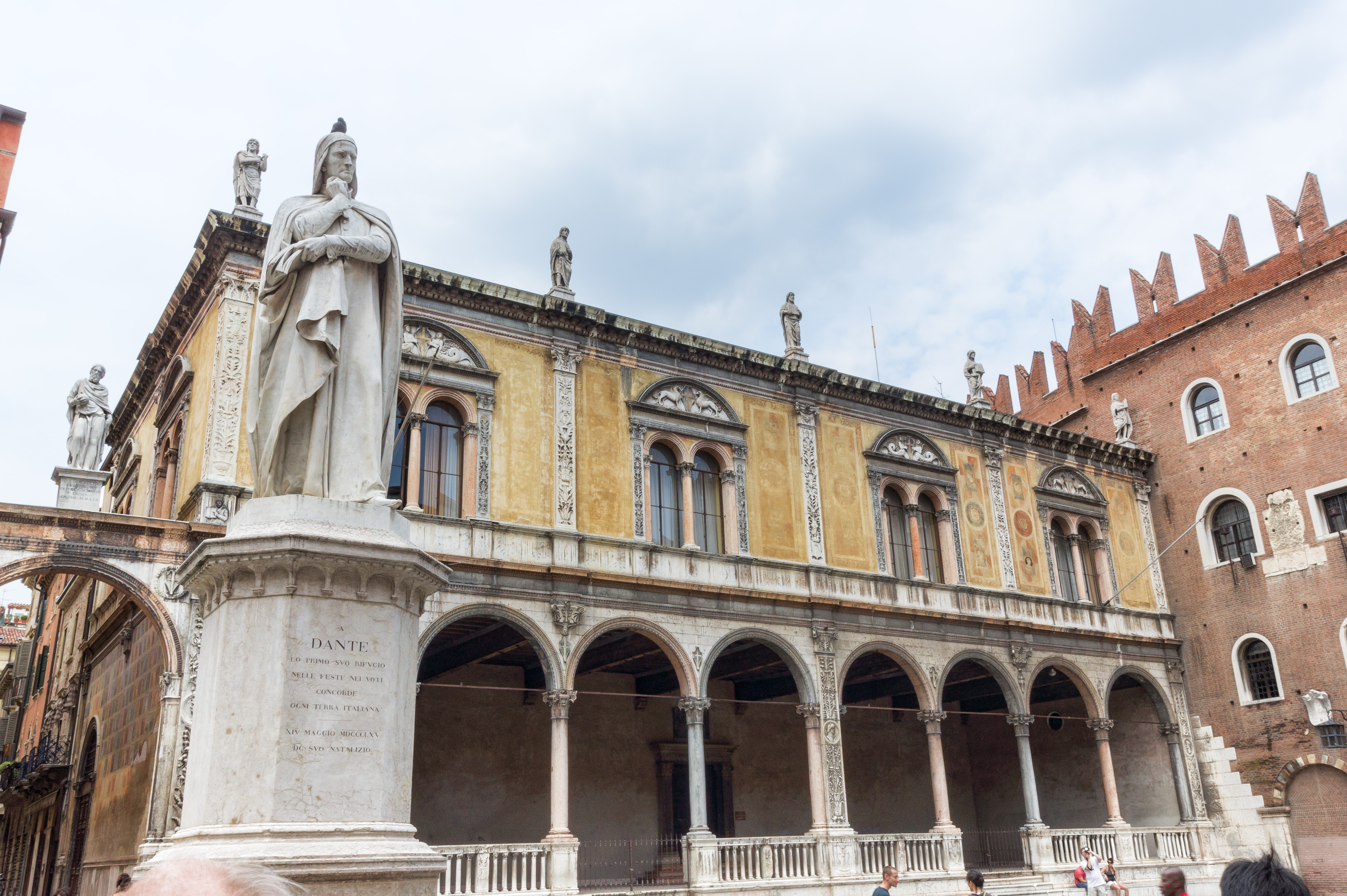
Loggia del Consiglio

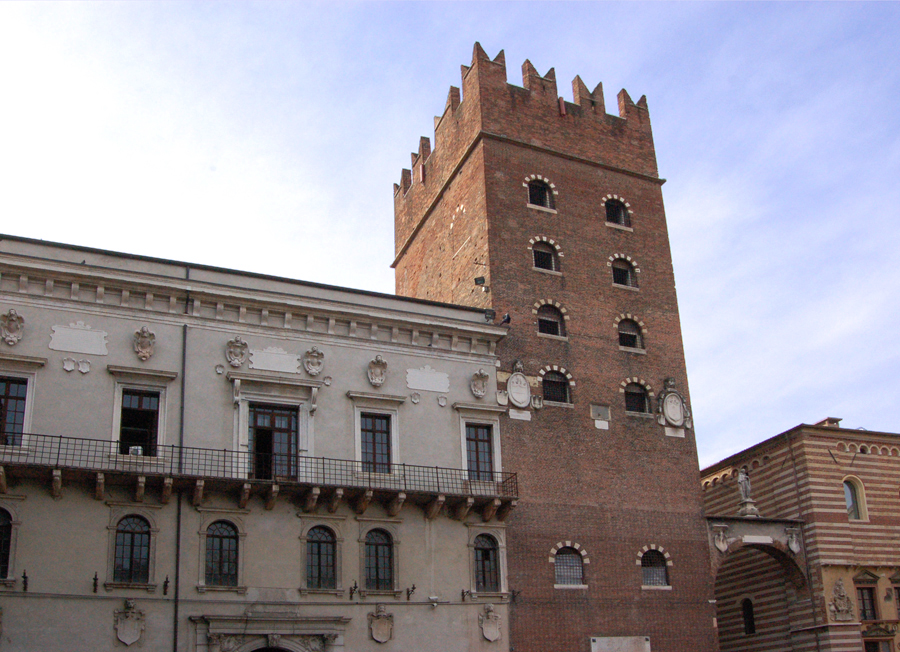
Palazzo Cansignorio.

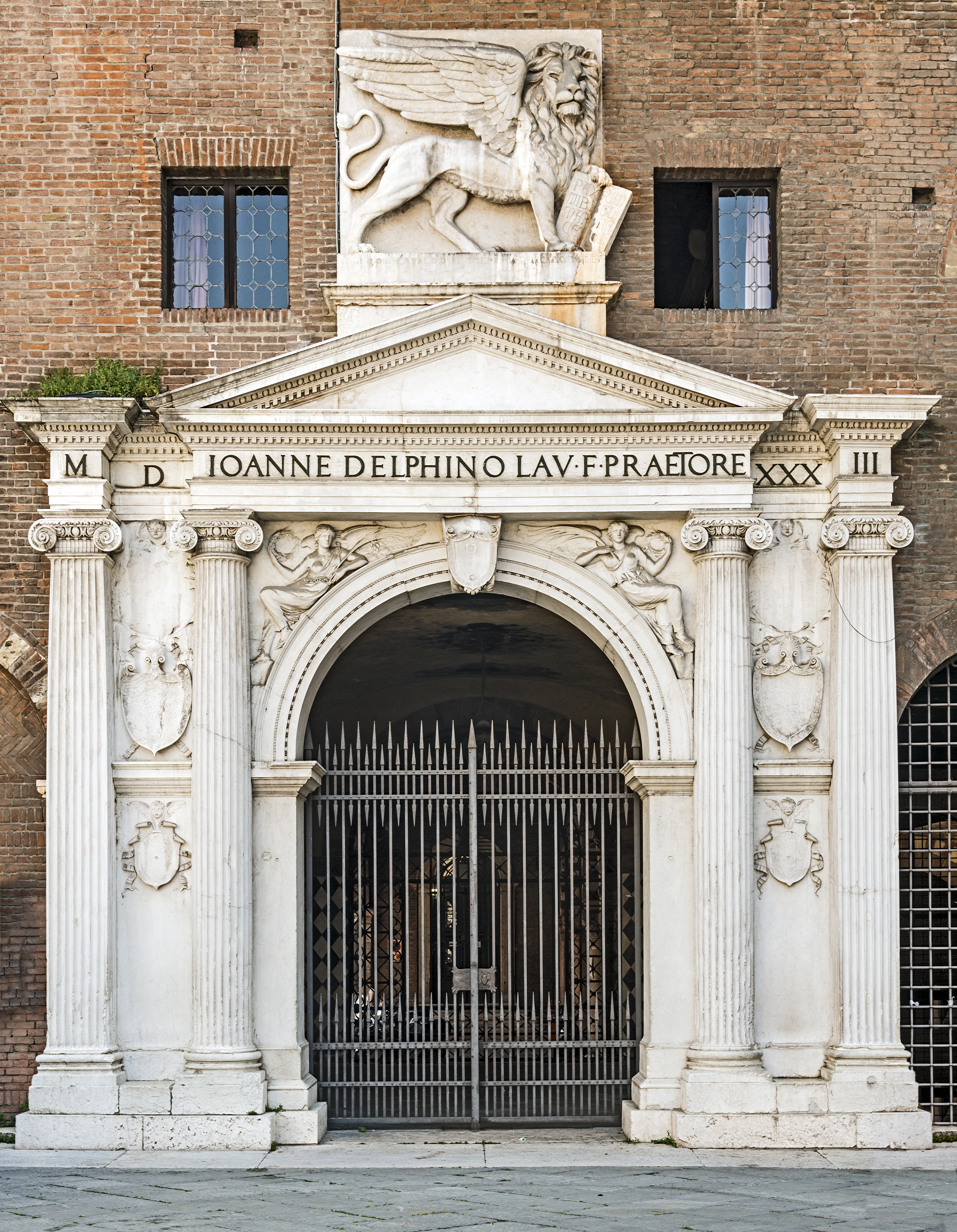
Palazzo del Podestà Maine gate

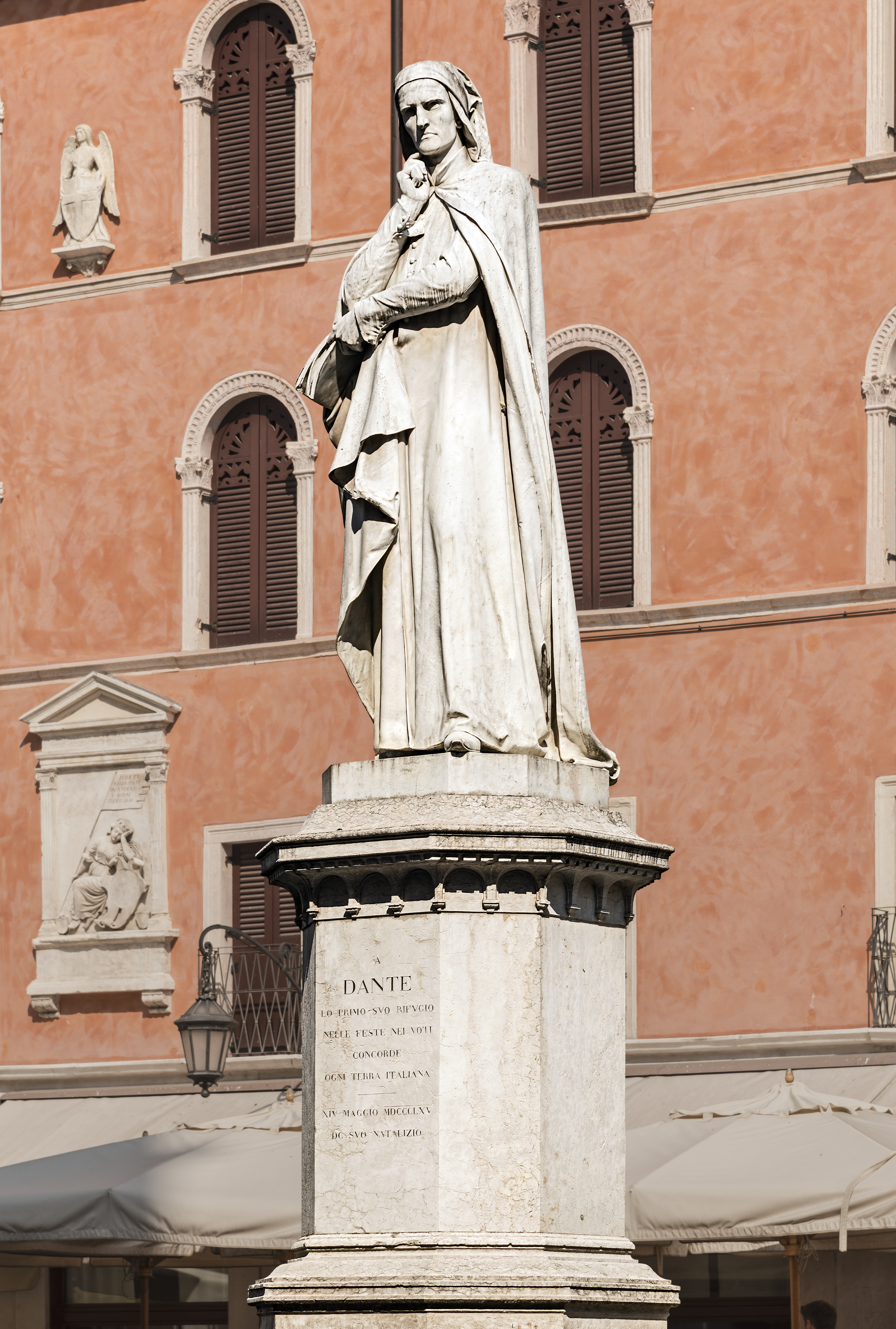
Monument to Dante

=== Monument to Dante ===
The monument to Dante Alighieri is a statue representing him, made in memory of his 6th centenary from his birth. When Dante was exiled from Florence he was a long guest in Verona. The statue is made of marble, three meters high and resting on a marble pedestal.
