= Palazzo del Podestà, Mantua =

Coordinates: 45.1588°N 10.7954°E

The Palazzo del Podestà, or Palazzo del Broletto, is a 13th-century palace, located between Piazza delle Erbe and Piazza Broletto, in the center of Mantua, region of Lombardy, Italy. The building for many years serving as the offices of the Municipality. The main facade faces Piazza Broletto.

== History ==
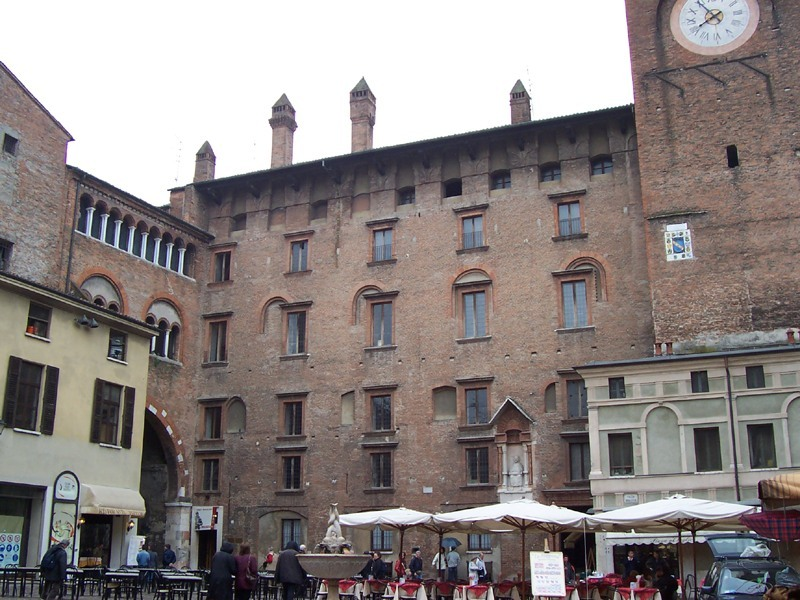
Piazza Broletto facade

The palace was built in 1227 as the home and offices of the commune government in Mantua. After a fire, the building was reconstructed in Renaissance-style by designs of Luca Fancelli, commissioned in the 15th century by Duke Ludovico Gonzaga. The main facade has a niche with a well-worn 13th-statue said to be of Virgil at his desk, between two columns.

The palace has, as described, two facades. The main facade on Piazza Broletto has a tall clocktower with an awkwardly place coat of arms. The niches hold the statue of Virgil and the Virgin. The palace shows the evidence of reconstruction across the centuries with walled up arches of prior windows, interrupted by newer construction.

At the Corner, a large arch, with mullioned windows are the Arch of the Arengario, that links the building to the town archives or Masseria.

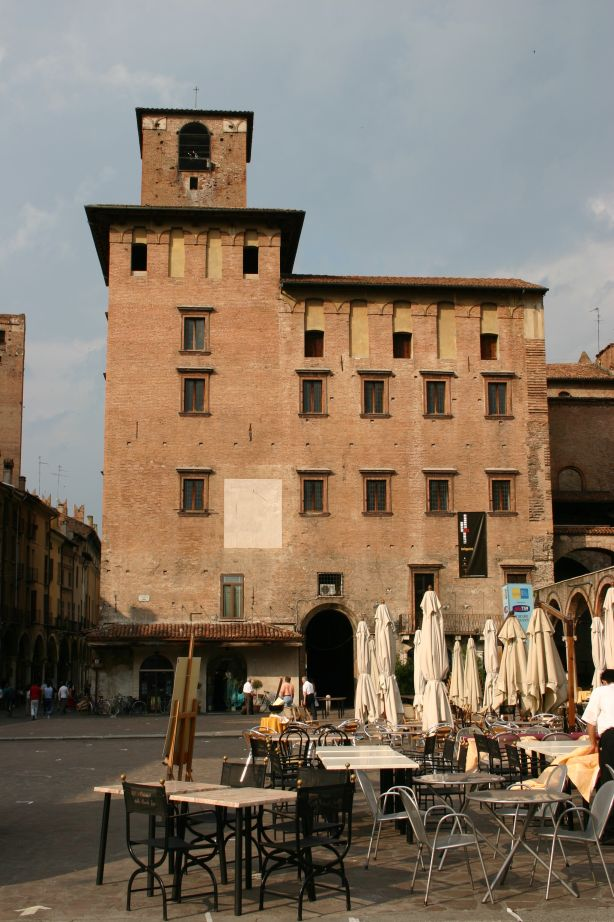
Piazza delle Erbe facade

The Palazzo del Podeatà facade, while still displaying the tipsy arrangement of windows is more sober in its decoration.

Presently, the palace is still under much needed reconstruction.
