= Arengario =

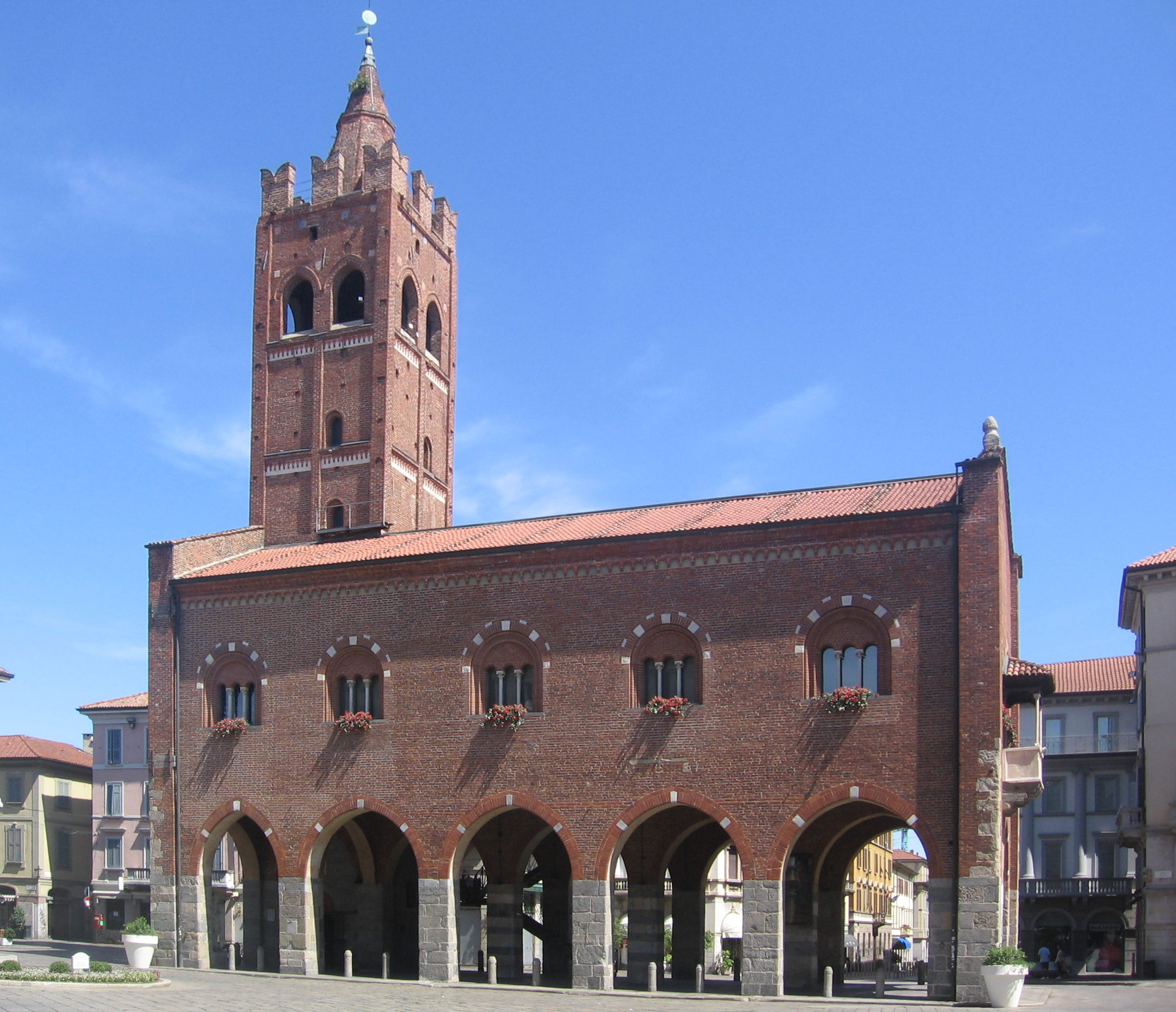
The Arengario (medieval town hall) of Monza

In Italy, an arengario (also spelled arrengario or arengo; pl.: arengari, arrengari, arenghi) is a government building in various historic periods, often with a balcony for giving speeches.

It was originally the town hall of Italian medieval communes, especially in Northern Italy.

The Fascist regime revived the form and often made it the seat of the local government and the podestà (mayor).

Notable arengari include:

- the medieval Arengario of Monza
- the Pallazo dell'Arengario of Milan, begun as a Fascist monument but only completed in the 1950s.

Some arengari are not buildings, but freestanding podiums for delivering speeches:

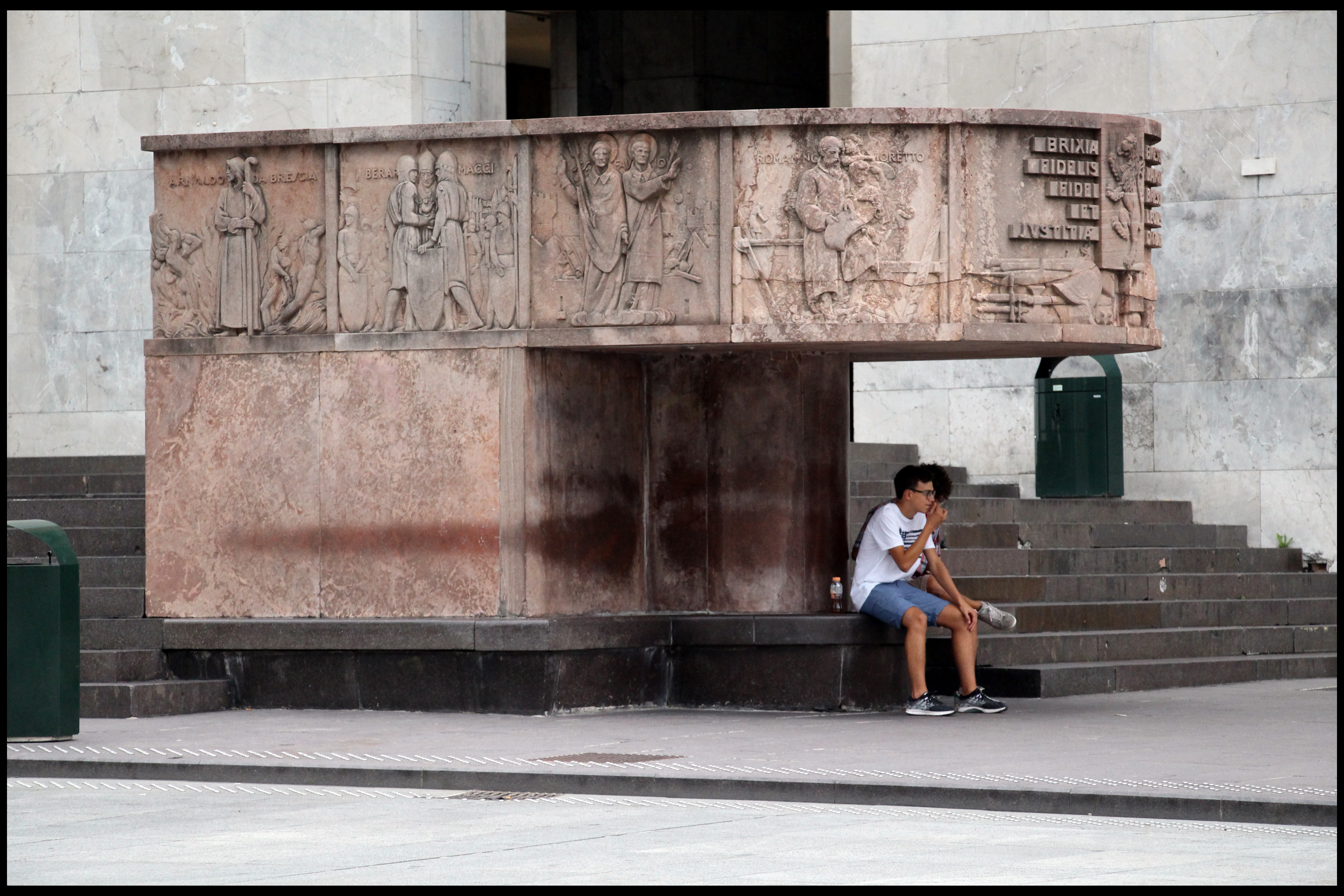
The freestanding Fascist arengario (speaker's platform) in Brescia

- the Fascist arengario of Brescia, conceived by Marcello Piacentini and designed and sculpted by Antonio Maraini;
- the Fascist "Arengario ai caduti fascisti" of Bergamo (Piazza Matteotti), built in 1939 to plans by Alziro Bergonzo and nicknamed ol pà de saù 'the cake of soap'. It was demolished on Liberation Day (April 1945). There is also an arengo at the base of the Torre dei Caduti in Bergamo.

== Etymology ==
Arengario comes from the verb arringare 'to address', as arengari usually have balconies for making speeches. It is related to the English word "harangue", but without the negative connotations.

== See also ==
- Broletto, another kind of Italian civic building
