= Symbols of Milan =

Symbols of the city of Milan, Italy

Milan
- Armiger: Giuseppe Sala, Mayor of Milan
- Adopted: 1934

The three symbols of Milan, the capital city of Lombardy, are the coat of arms, the gonfalon and the flag, as stated in the municipal charter.

The flag used by the modern city of Milan faithfully reproduces the one used by the Duchy of Milan from 1395 to 1797, namely a white banner with a red cross. Depending on the historical period and - in particular - on the reigning dynasty that ruled the city, different civic banners (the so-called Vexillum civitas) followed one another, which from time to time represented the noble family that ruled the Milanese duchy, without prejudice to the preservation of the primigenial white city flag with a red cross as the official state banner (the so-called Vexillum publicum).

The coat of arms of Milan consists of a silver (white) Samnite shield on which is superimposed a red cross. The whole is enclosed on the sides by a laurel branch and an oak branch, tied together by a tricolor ribbon. The shield, which is stamped with a gold or black-colored turreted crown, a symbol of the city title, has been in use in its modern form since March 19, 1934, when the relevant decree granting it was issued by the state. The red cross on a white field as the symbol of the city of Milan originated in the Middle Ages: this subject, which was first featured on the flag of Milan, was later the inspiration for the creation of the city's coat of arms.

The first gonfalon of Milan was a tapestry made around 1565 by embroiderers Scipione Delfinone and Camillo Pusterla from designs by Giuseppe Arcimboldi and Giuseppe Meda. Restored approximately twenty times over the next three centuries, it is kept inside the Castello Sforzesco, in the Sala del Gonfalone. A copy of it, which is kept in Palazzo Marino, in the Sala dell'Alessi, is displayed on the most important official occasions to represent the city of Milan. Both of the mentioned gonfalons depict, in the center, Saint Ambrose, bishop of Milan and patron saint of the city.

Other symbols of Milan, which are not officially recognized, are the half-woollen boar, an animal linked to the legend of its founding and the city's first symbol, the so-called "Madonnina," a golden statue placed on the highest spire of Milan Cathedral representing Mary, mother of Jesus Christ (this statue is also the protagonist of the Milanese dialect song "Oh mia bella Madonnina" by Giovanni D'Anzi, which is in fact considered the hymn of the city), the biscione (in Milanese dialect el bisson), portrayed in the act of swallowing or protecting, depending on the interpretation, a child or a naked man, originally a symbol of the Visconti family, Lords and then Dukes of Milan between the 13th and 15th centuries, and finally Meneghino, a character from the Milanese theater who later became a mask of the commedia dell'arte.

== Blazon ==
From left, the front and back sides of Milan's gonfalon, which is kept inside Palazzo Marino, the city hall, in the Sala dell'Alessi

The coat of arms of Milan was approved by decree of the Head of Government on March 19, 1934. The blazon of the city's symbols is thus given in the statute of the municipality of Milan:

1. The historic gonfalon, awarded the Gold Medal of Resistance, and depicting St. Ambrose, a bishop elected by the people, is the gonfalon of Milan.

2. The coat of arms of the City of Milan is heraldically described as follows: silver (white) to the red cross, topped with a turreted crown (a golden circle opened by eight posterns), and surrounded on either side at the bottom by green laurel and oak fronds knotted with a tricolor ribbon.

3. The flag of the City of Milan consists of a red cross on a white background.

The gonfalon of Milan is decorated with two honors. Milan was the first, among the twenty-seven cities decorated with a gold medal as "well-deserving of the national Risorgimento," to be awarded this honor for the highly patriotic actions performed by the city during the Risorgimento period (by the ruling House of Savoy, which granted Milan this honor, intended as the period between 1848 and 1918).

The Lombard capital is also among the cities decorated for military valor for the War of Liberation; in particular, it is awarded the Gold Medal of Military Valor for the sacrifices suffered by its population and for its activity in the Partisan Resistance during World War II.

The reasons for the awarding of the two honors are:

The flag of Milan, consisting of a red cross on a white field. It faithfully reproduces the Guelph banner of the City of Milan, which was used by the Lombard League against Frederick Barbarossa.

Medal to meritorious cities of the National Risorgimento - ribbon for ordinary uniform

Medal to meritorious cities of the National Risorgimento
"To commemorate the heroic deeds performed by the Milanese citizens in the five days of 1848. The Milanese popular insurrection erupted on March 18, 1848, on news of the revolution in Vienna and the insurrection in Venice. On the 23rd, the insurgents forced Marshal Radetzki to abandon the city and retreat to Verona. Among the insurgents there were about three hundred dead."
— Rome, March 18, 1898

Gold Medal of Military Valor - ribbon for ordinary uniform

Gold Medal of Military Valor
"In the epic "Five Days," rising up and driving a powerfully armed army from its walls, it demonstrated how much the popular impetus sustained by an unquenchable thirst for justice, freedom, and independence is worth against tyranny. Present with its martyrs and heroes in Mazzini's conspiracies and in the battles of the early Risorgimento, in the years from 1943 to 1945, though maimed and bloodied by wartime attacks, it opposed the ruthless enemy of all times, the pride and impetus of a relentless partisan struggle, in which it was prodigal with the blood of its best sons, and finally overwhelmed him in the victorious insurrection of April 25, 1945. An admirable example of civic and warrior virtues that the Republic honors. March 18–22, 1848, February 6, 1853, September 9, 1943, April 25, 1945."
— Rome, March 15, 1948

== History ==
=== The flag of Milan ===
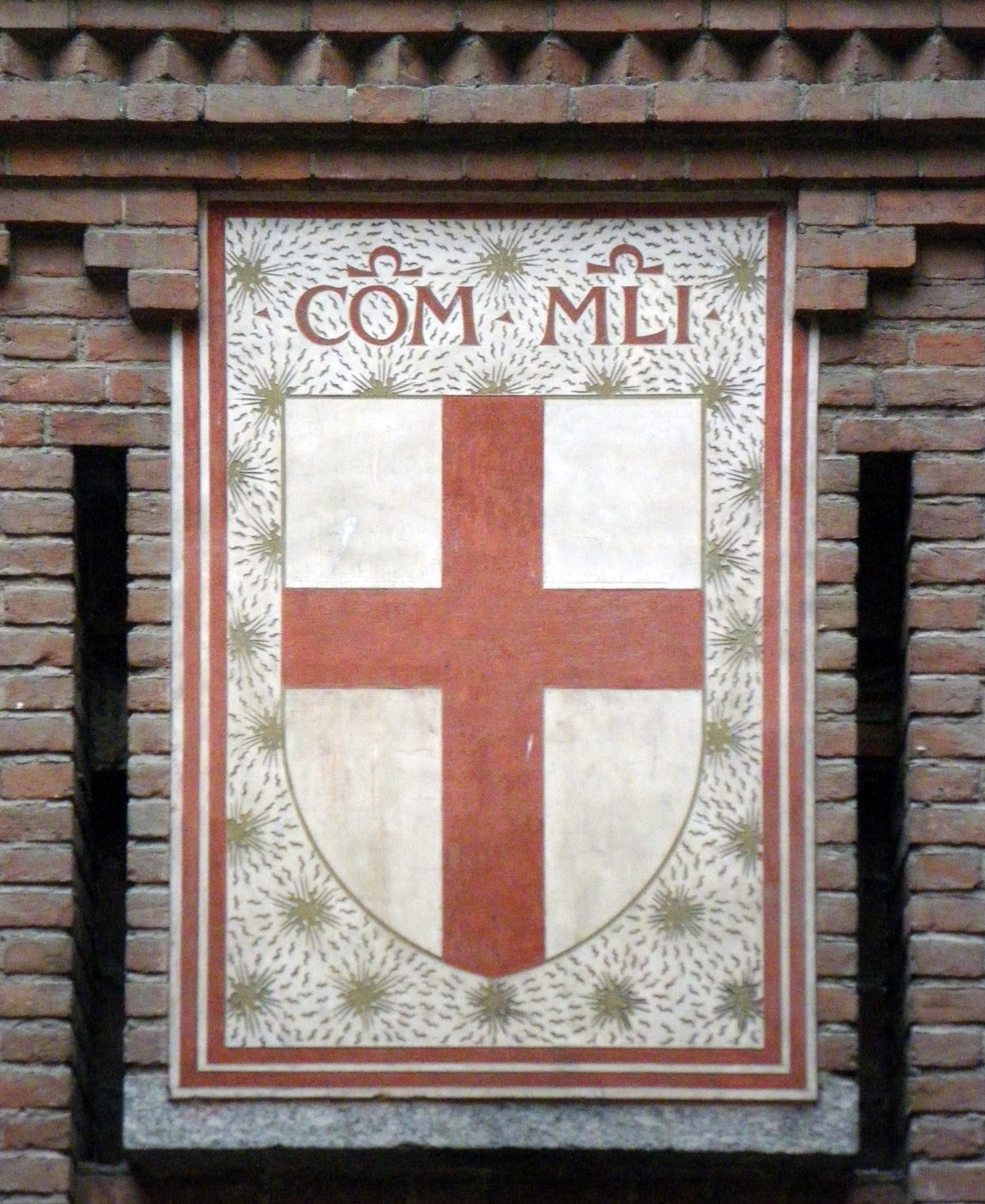
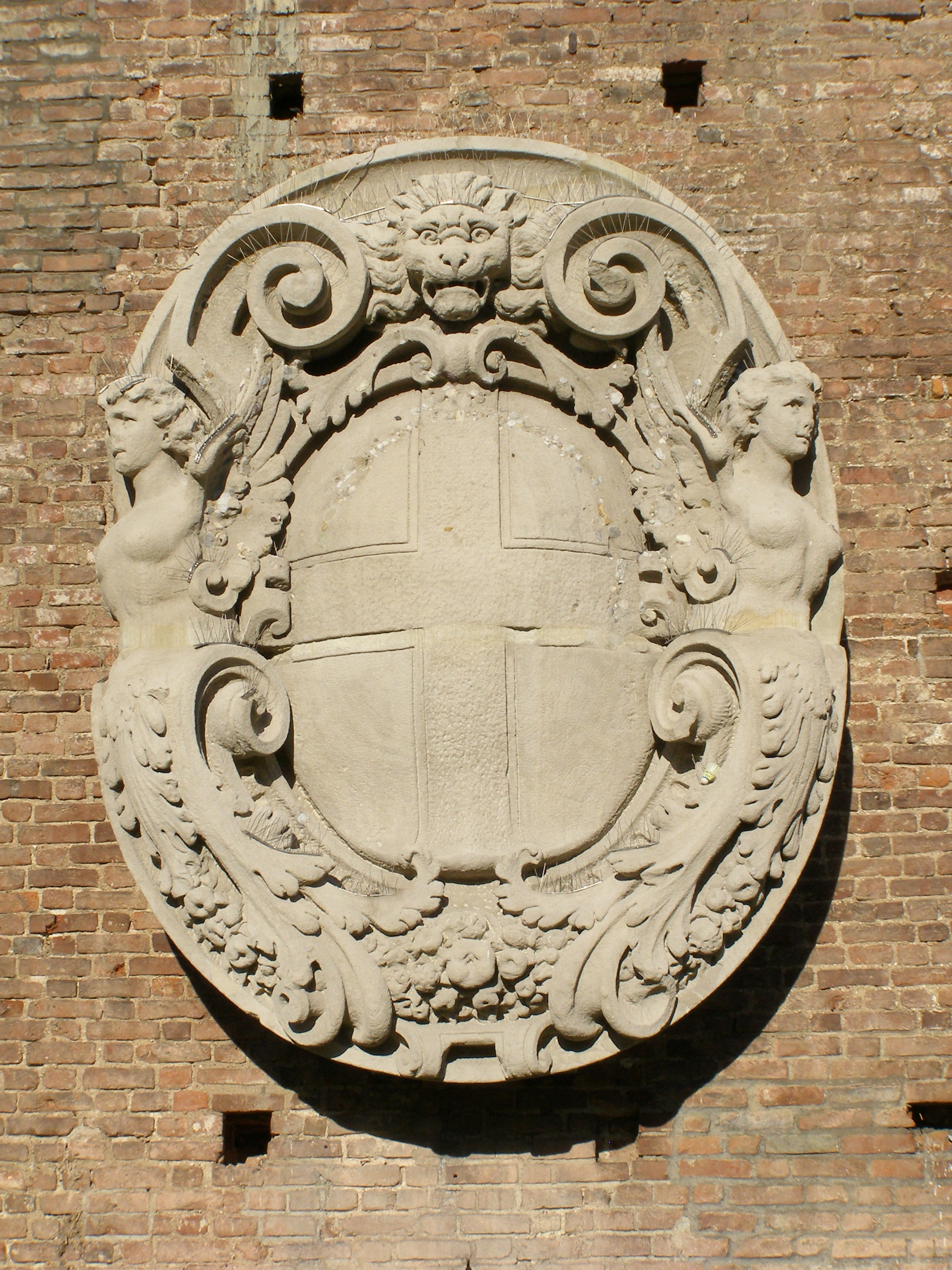
Coats of arms of Milan featured on the Castello Sforzesco. The debut of the coat of arms was later than that of the flag: the red cross on a white background, symbol of Milan, in fact debuted on a banner

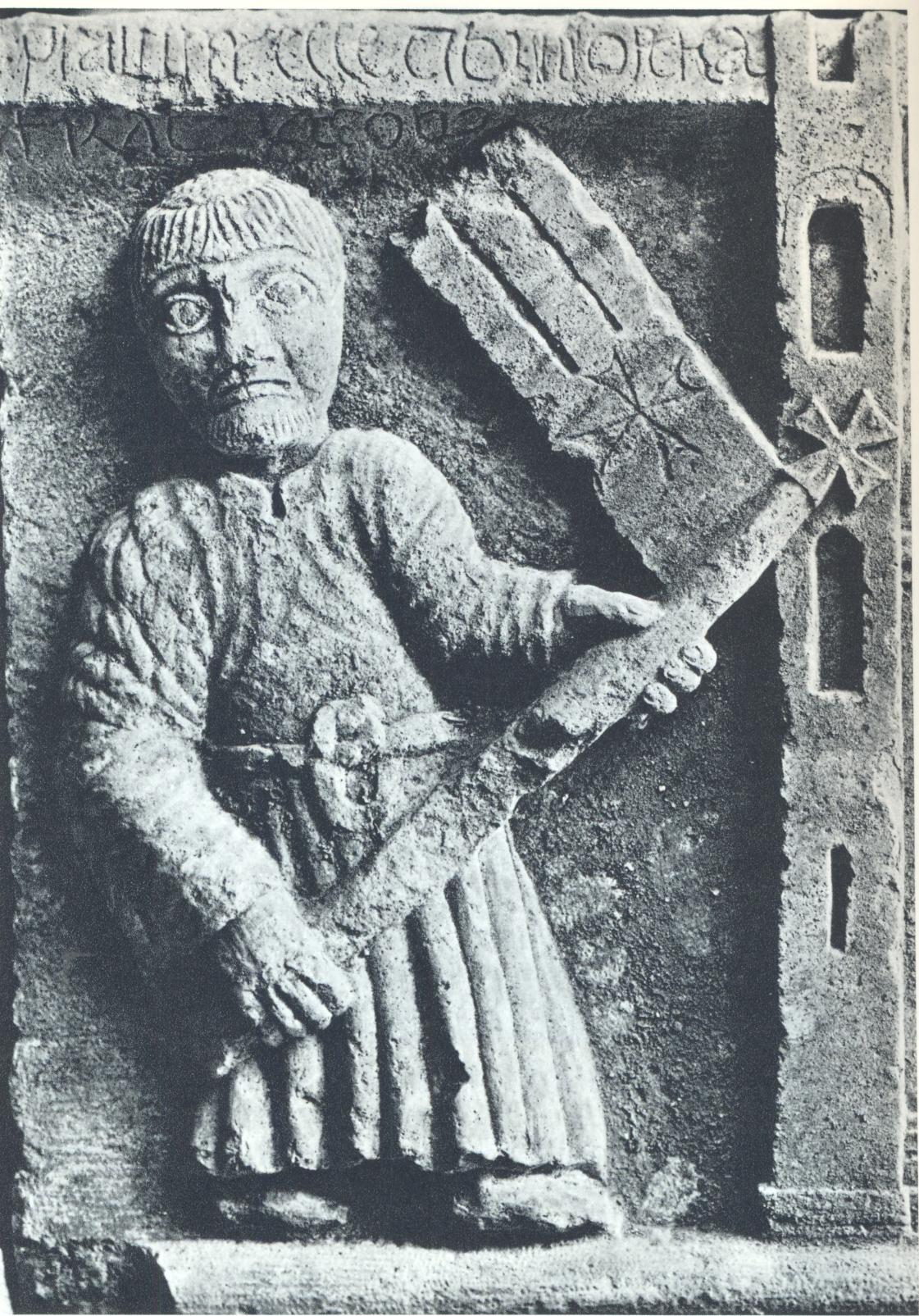
The first documented flag of Milan depicted on the bas-relief at Porta Romana.

Depending on the historical period and - in particular - on the ruling dynasty that dominated the city, different civic banners (the so-called Vexillum civitas, which could also be used as a war flag) followed one another, which from time to time represented the noble family that ruled the Milanese duchy (e.g. the blue biscione on a white field, which later became the coat of arms of the Visconti family and of the Duchy of Milan), without prejudice to the preservation of the primigenial white city flag with a red cross as the official state banner (the so-called Vexillum publicum).

Added to these two banners was the Vexillum populus, or the people's banner, which depicted the effigy of Saint Ambrose, bishop of Milan: this subject was later taken up by the Golden Ambrosian Republic, which existed from 1447 to 1450, for its own flag.

Legend has it that the cross was given as an insignia to the Milanese by Pope Gelasius I in the person of Alione Visconti, hypothetical fieldmaster general of the city army against Theodoric, king of the Ostrogoths, but this hypothesis does not stand up to historical verification.

In 1038, when Archbishop Ariberto da Intimiano armed the plebs and gave them the Carroccio, Milan did not yet have a flag, but according to the chronicler Arnolfo, an eyewitness to the events, two bands of snow-white fabric hung from the flagpole of the Carroccio. There was indeed a cross on the Carroccio, but it was a wooden Latin cross attached lower than the bands and above the altar, used for the celebration of religious rites.

The adoption of the symbol of the red cross on a silver field dates back to a time after the First Crusade, and all scholars agree that there was no heraldic symbol of Milan before that time. Other legend has it that the cross was adopted by Milanese crusaders during the conquest of the Holy Sepulcher.

The earliest written record mentioning the flag of Milan in the form of a red cross on a white field is dated 1155: it is recorded on a letter sent by the Tortonians to the consuls of Milan. On this document the flag of Milan is described as a white banner on which is placed a red cross in the form of a "pattée," that is, a cross with arms spreading out at the ends.

This early flag, which later gave rise to the modern banner, is depicted on a bas-relief once present on medieval Porta Romana, which was demolished in 1793: this bas-relief was saved from destruction and is now on display at the Castello Sforzesco. As for the cross, the Milanese chose this subject as their symbol in homage to Jesus Christ: thus it did not originate, as one might believe, from the Crusades, the Holy Roman Empire or the Papacy.

Giorgio Giulini reports in his Memoirs that the Lodi historian Ottone Morena personally saw in 1160 the Carroccio of Milan on which towered "a very large white banner with a red cross," a standard that also appeared on the Carroccio used in the Battle of Legnano (May 29, 1176), an armed clash that saw the Lombard League victorious over the army of the Holy Roman Empire led by Frederick Barbarossa. In fact, the Lombard League chose the red-crossed white standard of Milan as its banner.

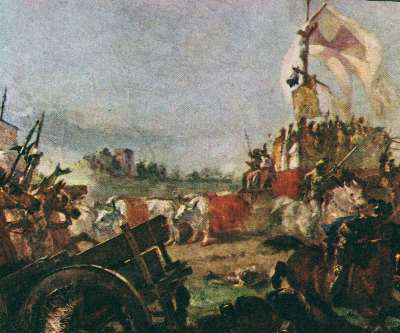
The Carroccio during the Battle of Legnano in a painting by Amos Cassioli. On the Carroccio can be seen the red crossed white banner of the Lombard League, which was borrowed from the banner of Milan

After the Battle of Legnano, the Milanese cross emblem became a symbol of authority and autonomy, and many cities in northern Italy adopted it; from 1859 the Province of Milan itself accepted it as the basis of its coat of arms, which would later change to the current one present since 1992 and later adopted by the metropolitan city of Milan.

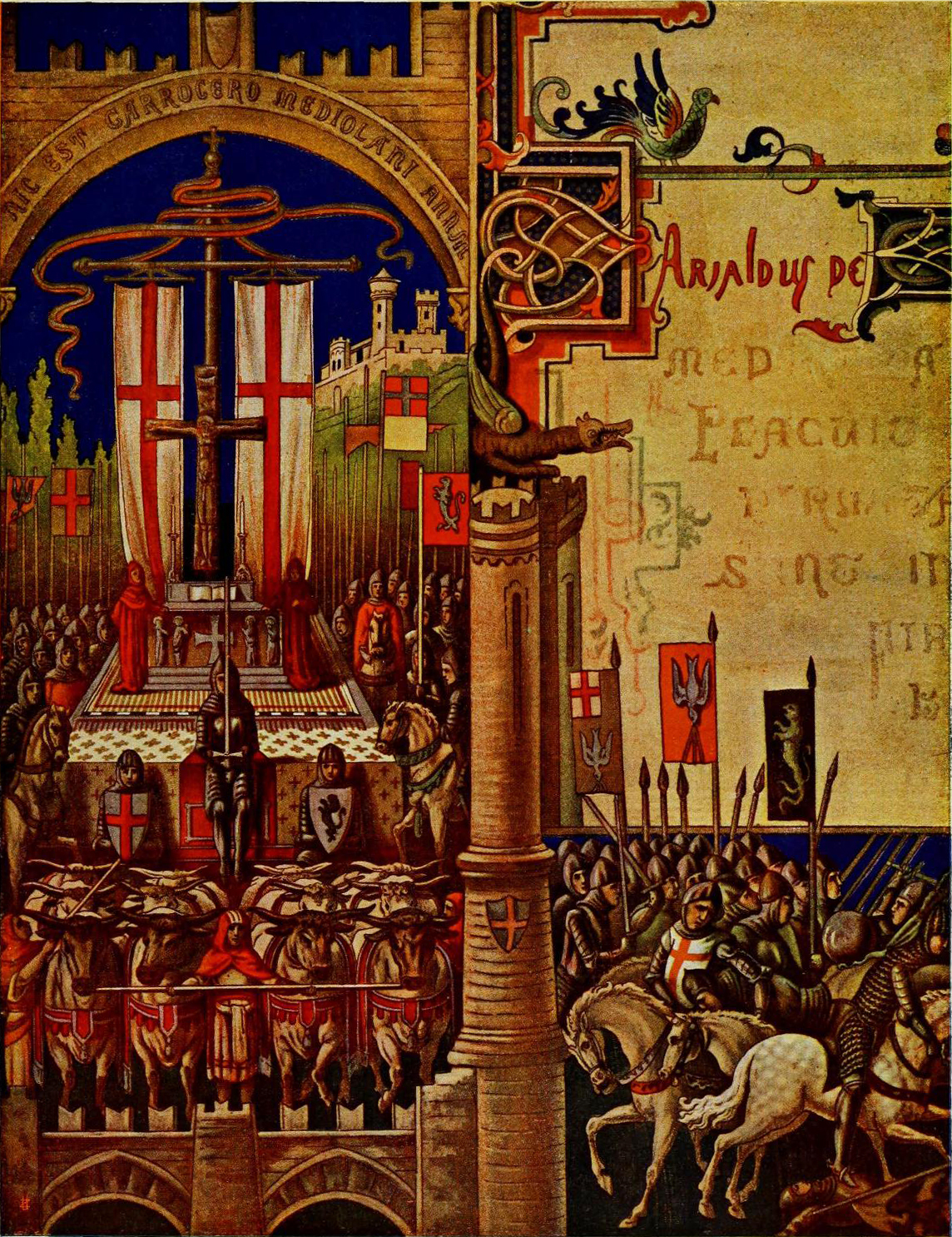
The Carroccio of Milan on an ancient miniature. One can see, on the Carroccio, the Vexillum publicum of the municipality of Milan, consisting of a red cross on a white background

Thus it was only in the 13th century that the flag of Milan took its final form, namely a red cross on a white field, abandoning the primitive "pattée" shape. From it was then derived the coat of arms of Milan, namely a silver (white) Samnite shield on which there is a red cross, which is still used today. The debut of the cross on a white field on the city coat of arms was thus subsequent to the first appearance of this symbol of Milan on a flag: it was the red cross on a white field present on the banner of Milan that later inspired the subject of the city's coat of arms.

The war flag of the Duchy of Milan, on the other hand, was a banner used from 1277 to 1540 by the Visconti and later by the Sforza family having in the center a "biscione" in the act of swallowing a child: the "biscione" later became one of the most famous symbols of Milan. To the military ensign of Milan Dante Alighieri dedicated these verses of the Divine Comedy:

[...] The viper that leads the Milanese afield [...]

— Dante Alighieri, Divine Comedy, canto eight of the Purgatorio

The meanings that could be associated with these verses are two: "the Milanese army camps only where the biscione was set," i.e., the banner of the Visconti, or "the biscione that the Milanese keep in their military camp."

From this flag of war was derived the civic standard of the Visconti, who added a black imperial eagle on a gold background to the biscione in 1329 (in honor of Azzone Visconti's obtaining the imperial vicariate), and which was later retained by the Sforza. An exception was the civic banner used from 1395 to 1402, in the early years of the Duchy, where the fleur-de-lys of France, granted by the King of France Charles VI for the duke's marriage to Isabella of Valois, and the snake were depicted: then, in place of the fleur-de-lys of France, the Visconti imperial eagle was restored.

Noteworthy was the state flag of the Golden Ambrosian Republic, created in 1447 due to the heirless death of Filippo Maria Visconti. The Milanese republic was abolished in 1450 with the seizure of power by Francesco Sforza, who restored the Duchy of Milan. The flag of the Golden Ambrosian Republic took up the ancient Milanese crossed banner to which the figure of St. Ambrose, bishop of Milan, was added.

=== Evolution of the flags and banners of Milan ===
First flag of Milan of which there is a documented record (1171)

State flag (Vexillum publicum) of the Duchy of Milan (1395-1797)

War flag (Vexillum civitas) of Milan from the Visconti era (1277-1395)

Flag of the Ambrosian Republic

One of the variants of the Flag of the Ambrosian Republic.

Flag of war (Vexillum civitas) of Milan (1395-1402)

War flag (Vexillum civitas) of Milan from the Visconti and Sforza periods (1395-1499)

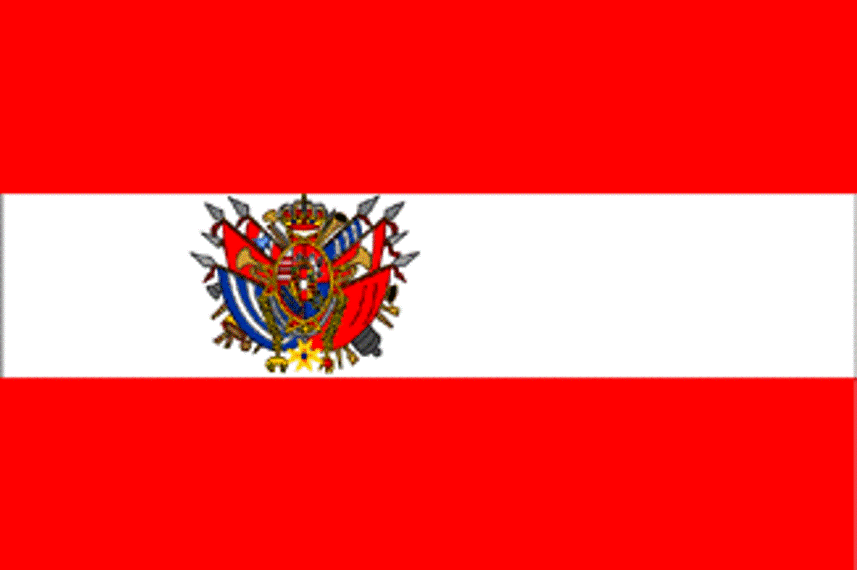
Alternative state flag (Vexillum publicum) during the Austrian rule of Habsburg-Lorraine (1765-1796)

=== The birth of the coat of arms of Milan ===
Seal of the Ambrosian Republic (1447-50)

Hypothetical banner of the Golden Ambrosian Republic

At the founding of the medieval commune of Milan (1045), a shield party of white (symbol of the people) and red (symbol of the nobles) was used as the coat of arms. The adoption of the red cross on a white field as a coat of arms dates back to the 12th century as a sign of greater autonomy from the Holy Roman Empire; Milan was not an exception, as the use of a civic coat of arms began to be common for other cities as well.

The earliest record of the coat of arms in its present form is from the 14th century and was on the ark of Azzone Visconti present in the church of San Gottardo in Corte, now lost, where Saint Ambrose was depicted carrying the white banner with the red cross.

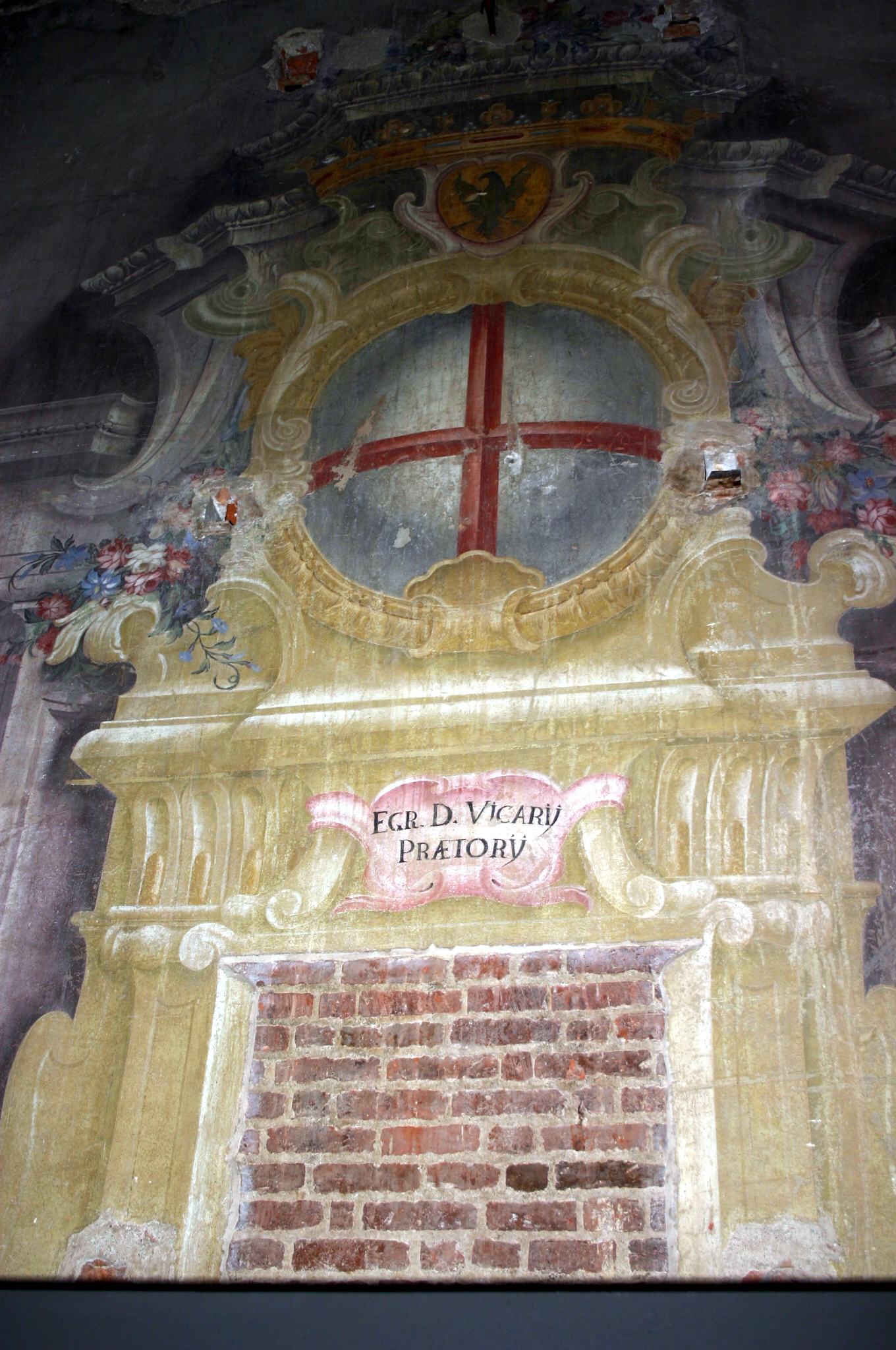
Fresco on the back wall of what used to be a magistrates' bench on the second floor of the "Broletto nuovo" or "Palazzo della Ragione," the old Palace of Justice in Milan. The fresco, below the coat of arms of Milan, bears the Latin inscription Egregij Domini Vicarij Praetorij ("The egregious substitute of the praetor")

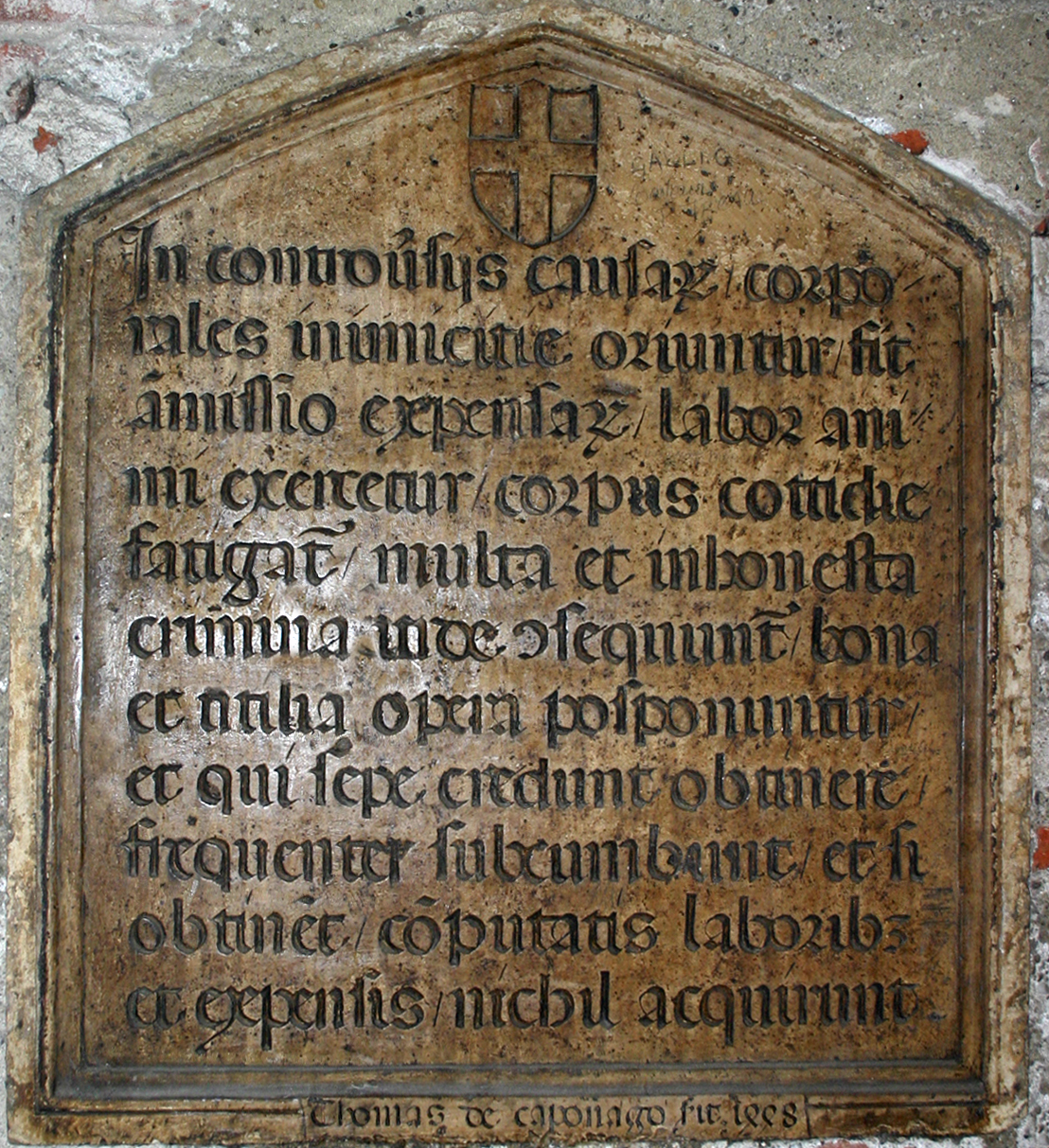
Inscription by Tommaso da Caponago (1448) warning of all the evils that cause lawsuits in court. It is located in the entrance of the "Broletto nuovo" or "Palazzo della Ragione," the old Palace of Justice in Milan, in the Casa dei Panigarola

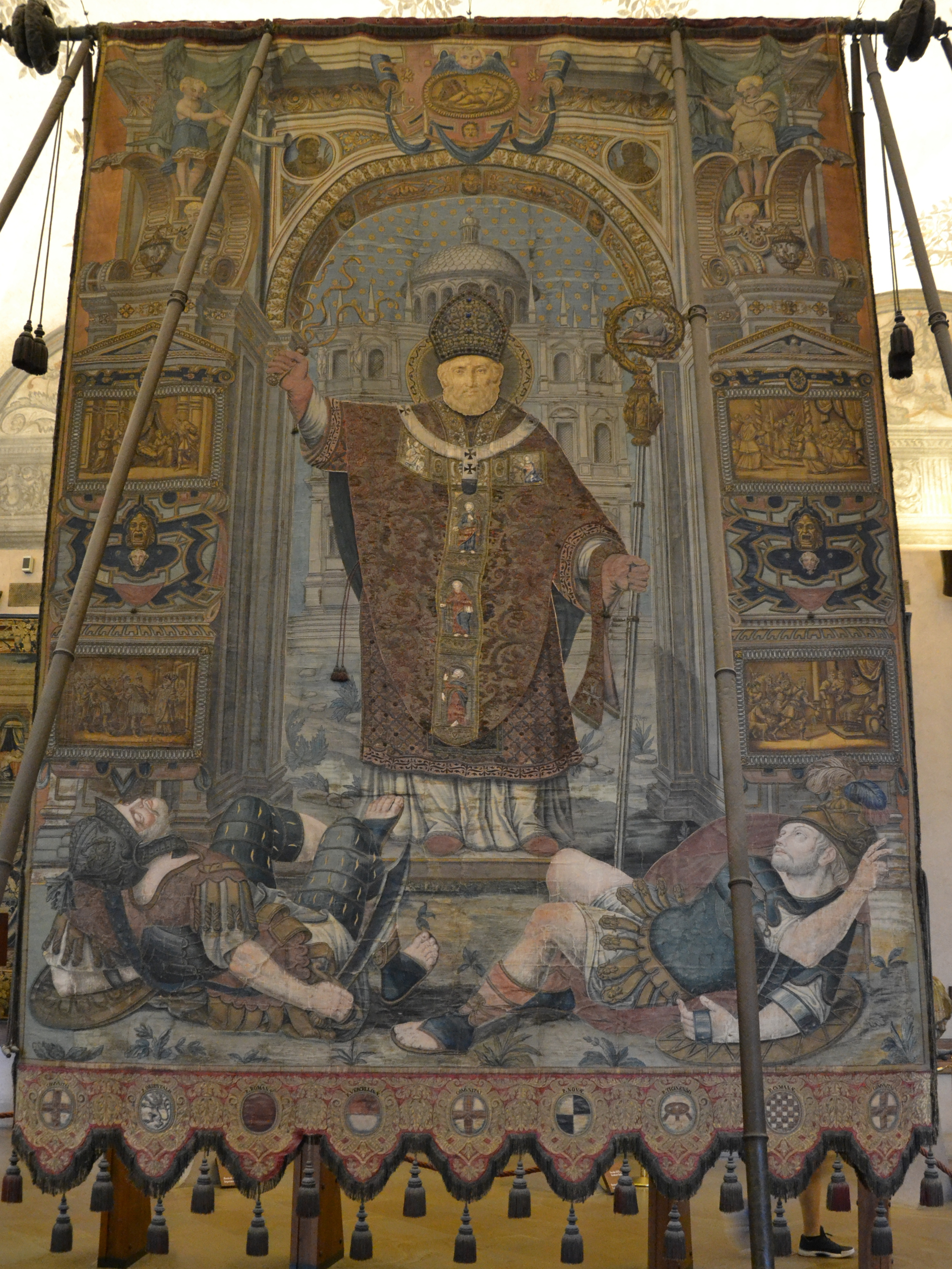
The 1565 tapestry by Scipione Delfinone and Camillo Pusterla, the first gonfalon of Milan. It is kept inside the Castello Sforzesco, in the Sala del Gonfalone

Later, under the rule of the Viscontis, the red-crossed white coat of arms was often replaced by the biscione, the emblem of this noble family and of the Duchy of Milan, possibly returning to use as the coat of arms of the Golden Ambrosian Republic (1447-1450); in fact, two tapestries in the 1647 Fahnenbuch ("book of flags"), attributed to the Ambrosian Republic and bearing a red-crossed white shield as its coat of arms, are considered to be of dubious historical value. There is historical evidence of the Ambrosian Republic's use of the red cross on a white field as its flag, to which the figure of St. Ambrose was added.

Worthy of note is an inscription dating back to 1448, which is surmounted by the coat of arms of Milan in the form of a crossed shield, found in the Casa Panigarola, a historic Milanese palace located in Piazza dei Mercanti, where it served as the "Office of the Statutes," that is, the place that provided for the registration and transcription of ducal decrees, public acts as well as determining the categories of private acts. The inscription, which warns of all the evils that cause lawsuits in court, reads:

In controversijs causarum corporales inimicitie oriuntur, fit amissio expensarum, labor animi exercetur, corpus cottidie fatigatur, multa et inhonesta crimina inde consequuntur, bona et utilia opera posponuntur, et qui sepe credunt obtinere frequenter subcumbunt, et si obtinent, computatis laboribus et expensis, nichil acquirunt. Thomas de Caponago scripsit, 1448
Corporal discords arise in the disputes of causes: the loss of expenses takes place, the work of the mind is exercised, the body, every day, is fatigued and many disonest crimes result therefrom, good and useful works are delayed and those who often believe they obtain more frequently succumb and if they obtain, counted the labors and expenses, nothing is acquired. Tommaso da Caponago wrote in 1448.

— Tommaso da Caponago, 1448, Casa dei Panigarola, Milano

In later centuries the coat of arms of Milan was sometimes embellished with the effigy of St. Ambrose. Beginning in the 16th century other ornaments such as cartouches, crowns and fronds began to appear.

=== The gonfalon of Milan ===
The first gonfalon of the city of Milan was a tapestry made around 1565 by embroiderers Scipione Delfinone and Camillo Pusterla from designs by Giuseppe Arcimboldi and Giuseppe Meda. It was blessed by Charles Borromeo and first carried in procession for the Feast of Pentecost on June 2, 1566. Restored about twenty times over the next three hundred years, it is kept inside the Sforza Castle, in the Sala del Gonfalone.

It measures 5.2 m high by 3.57 m wide. It depicts, in the center, Saint Ambrose, armed with a lash, in the act of driving out the Arians; below it are the coats of arms of the six sestieri of Milan and three times the coat of arms of the city. On the sides are depicted episodes from the life of Saint Ambrose.

A copy of it, which is kept in Palazzo Marino, in the Sala dell'Alessi, is displayed on the most important official occasions to represent the city of Milan.

=== Habsburg and Napoleonic eras ===
Coat of arms of Milan granted by Napoleon in 1813

In 1805 Milan became first the capital of the Italian Republic and then of the Kingdom of Italy, states directly dependent on Napoleonic France.

With the French Revolution, all coats of arms, considered "symbols of slavery," were initially abolished but, later, Napoleon Bonaparte restored the possibility of having a city coat of arms; to prevent abuses on January 17, 1812, he decreed from the Tuileries Palace that "no city, no municipality or public establishment should display any particular coat of arms unless it had first obtained its express permission by letters patent."

Milan had, on January 9, 1813, the concession of the coat of arms, whose blazon reads:

It bears the silver shield with the flat and centered cross of gules; terminated by the chief of green with the letter N of gold placed in the heart and approached by three six-leafed roses of the same; crowned by the mural crown with seven battlements, of gold, surmounted by the rising eagle in the natural, holding in its talons a golden caduceus in a band. The whole accompanied by two interlaced festoons of olive and oak of the latter, divided between the two sides, rejoined and hanging from the tip

— Blazon of the coat of arms of Milan from the Napoleonic era.

The chief present above the ancient coat of arms was that of the good cities of the kingdom. When Napoleon fell in 1814, the coat of arms surmounted by the Napoleonic chief was also discontinued.

On April 3, 1816, Emperor Francis I of Austria, by a decree, replaced the vegetable branches with a gold ornament: according to the Austrian ruler, gold, the noblest of metals, better suited a royal and important city like Milan; above the crown was placed the Habsburg double-headed eagle.

The golden friezes and branches were later replaced by green olive and oak fronds tied with a light blue ribbon.

=== The Unification of Italy and the decree of concession ===
The chief of the lictor, upper section of coats of arms made mandatory for all municipalities, provinces and legal entities during the fascist regime

Coat of arms of Milan, in the form of a marshalled shield, present on the arm toward Via Silvio Pellico of the Galleria Vittorio Emanuele II

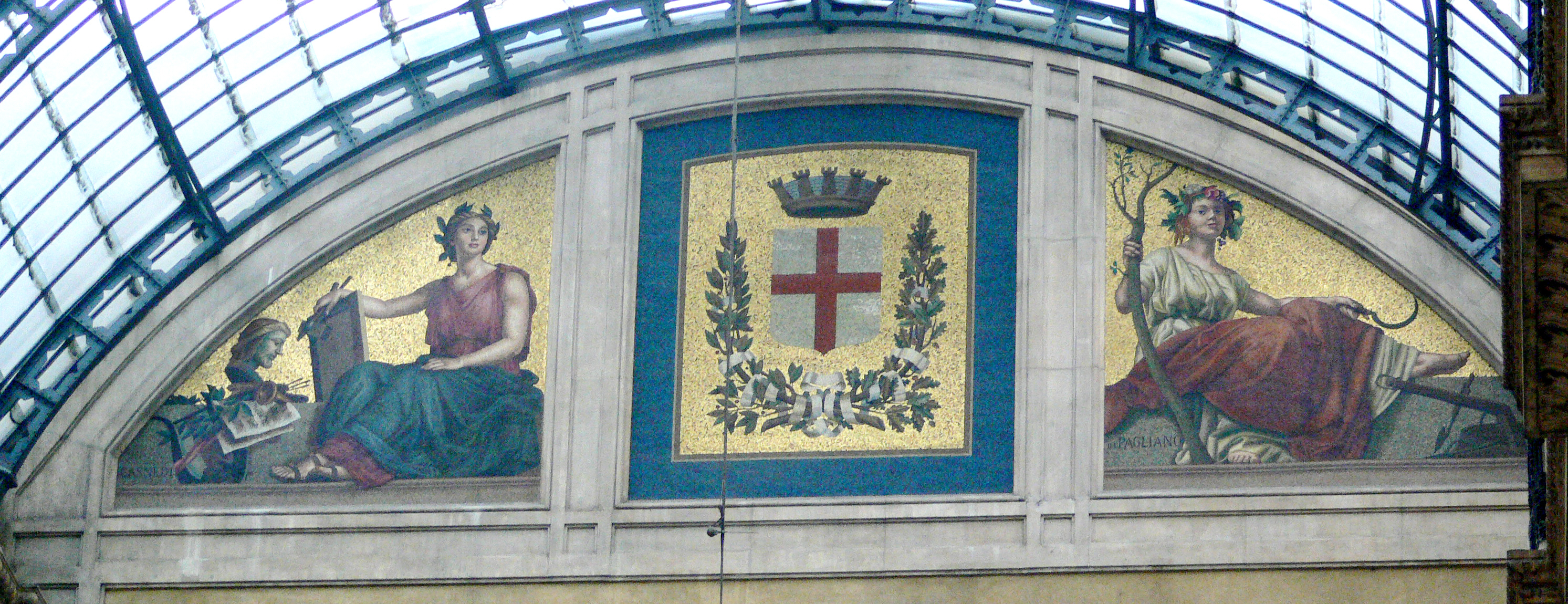
Coat of arms of Milan decorating the Galleria Vittorio Emanuele II

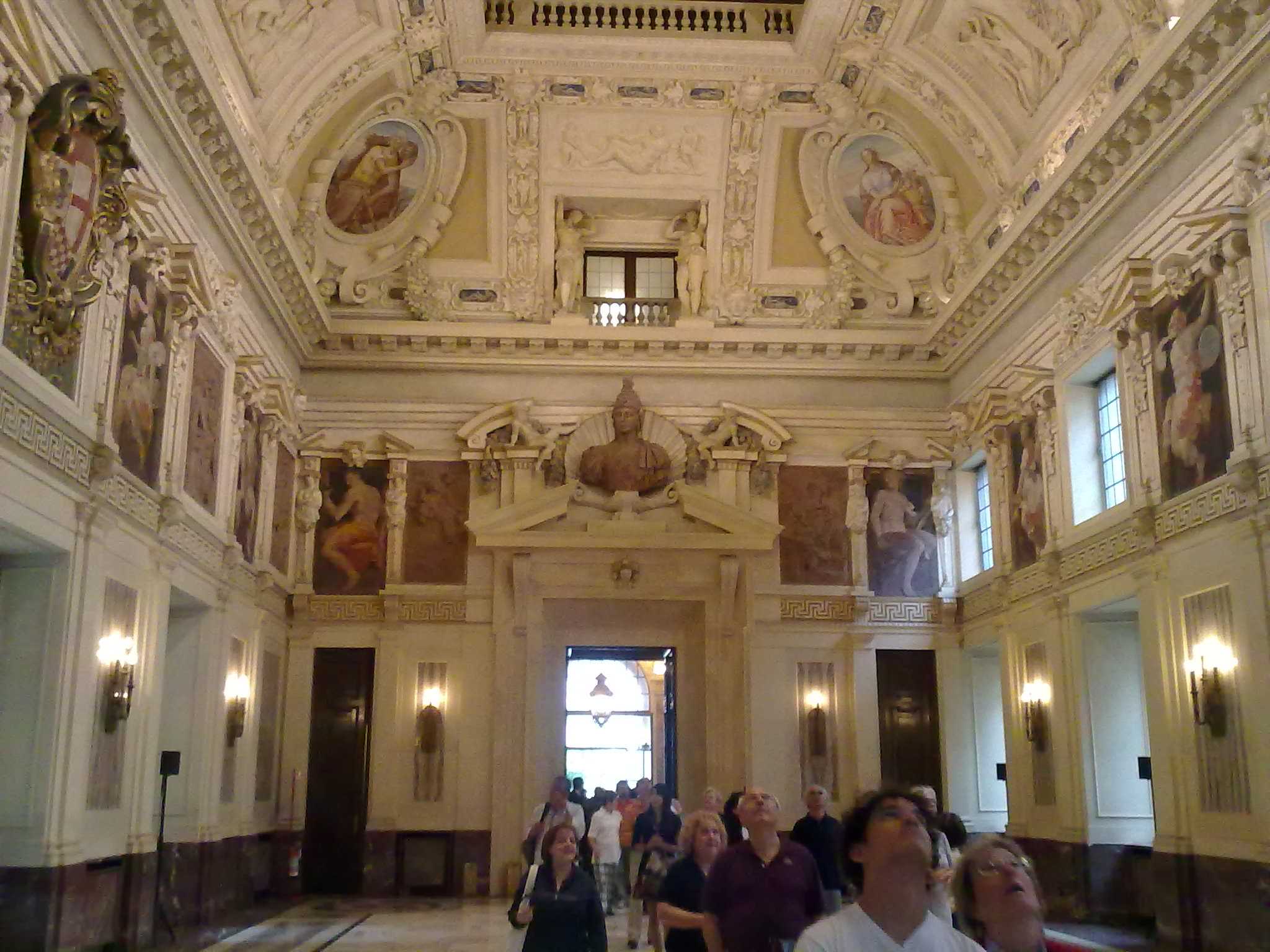
The Alessi Hall in Palazzo Marino, where the city's modern gonfalon is kept

With the passage of Milan to the Kingdom of Sardinia (1859), the double-headed eagle was first removed and later the shapes of the cross, shield and ornaments were changed (October 1860). The Milan city council approved other minor changes on May 13, 1867, after the proclamation of the Kingdom of Italy had already taken place, and more were added in 1899.

In 1932, during the Fascist regime, Milan's podestà Marco Visconti took steps so that, in accordance with the requirements of the current law, the coat of arms of Milan would also have legal recognition by the Italian state with the issuance of an ad hoc decree. On May 13, Marco Visconti wrote to the prefect stating that it was necessary to replace the coat of arms present on numerous buildings and in other contexts; having abandoned the idea of including the fasces in the same, given the time-consuming nature of creating the draft of a new coat of arms, he also requested legal recognition of the city's coat of arms, which would be essentially the same as the ancient one.

On June 14, the prefect forwarded the application to the Presidency of the Council of Ministers, enclosing the details of the previous Habsburg recognition. While waiting for the official concession, the podestà appointed, on February 16, 1933, a commission having "the task of proposing a project for a coat of arms of the city of Milan which, recalling the traditions of the city, would respond to heraldic and aesthetic requirements." The commission, chaired by the podestà, was composed of Giovanni Vittani, Romolo Caggese, Lodovico Pogliani, Alessandro Giulini and Giorgio Nicodemi (secretary).

On March 19, 1934, after several reminders, the concession decree was issued by the Italian state: from this date the coat of arms took its present form, namely a silver Samnite shield on which there is a red cross, all surmounted by a turreted crown, the symbol of Italian cities.

The coat of arms included the chief of the lictor, which had previously become obligatory for all coats of arms of municipalities, provinces and moral entities, by Decree No. 1440 of October 12, 1933; the latter measure was later repealed by Lieutenancy Decree No. 394 of December 10, 1944, and thus the coat of arms lost this section, which was located in the upper part of the shield, retaining only the turreted crown of the city and the wreath of oak and laurel enclosed by the tricolor tie.

=== Modern uses of the coat of arms of Milan ===
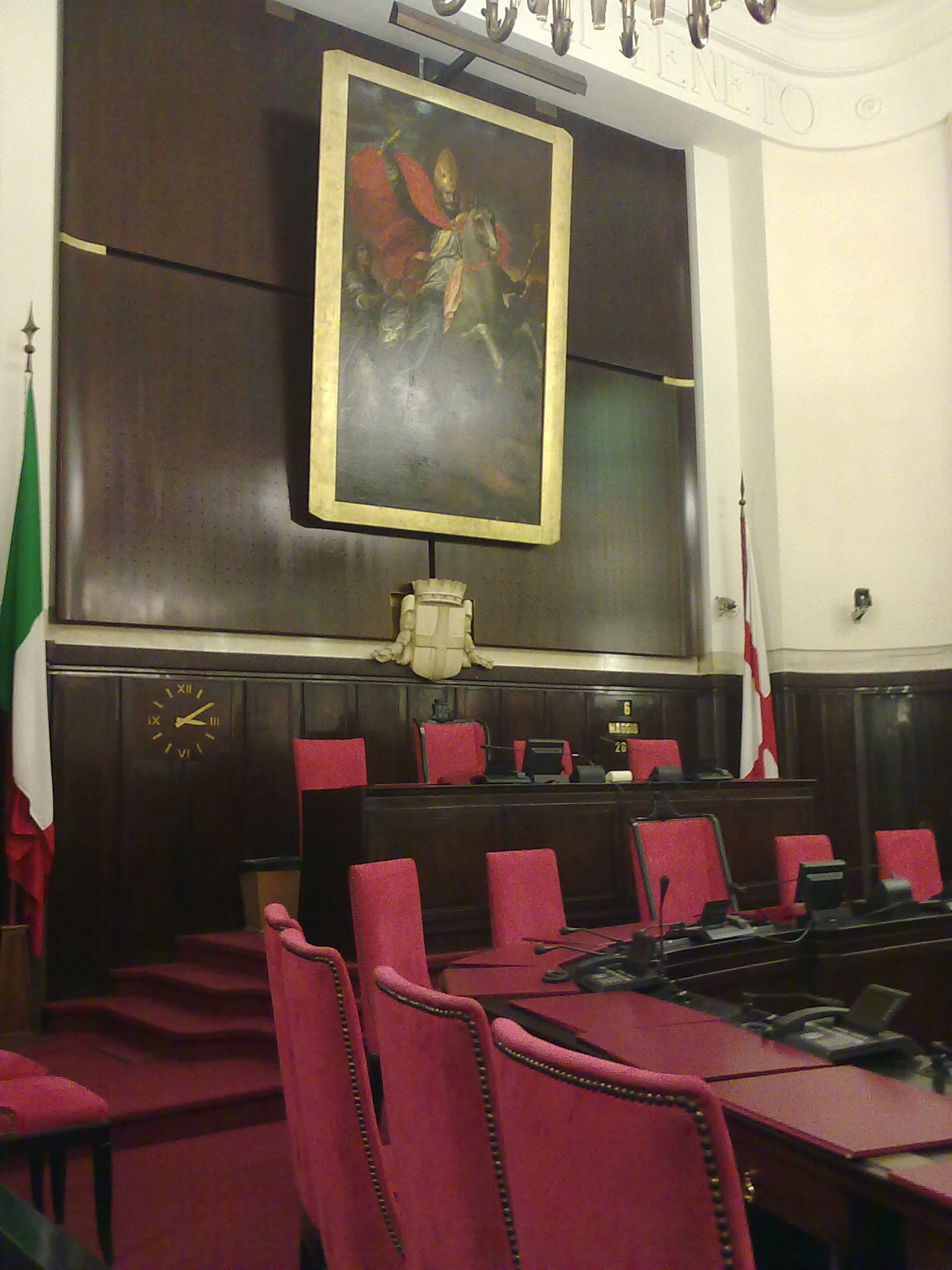
Coat of arms of Milan in the council chamber at Palazzo Marino

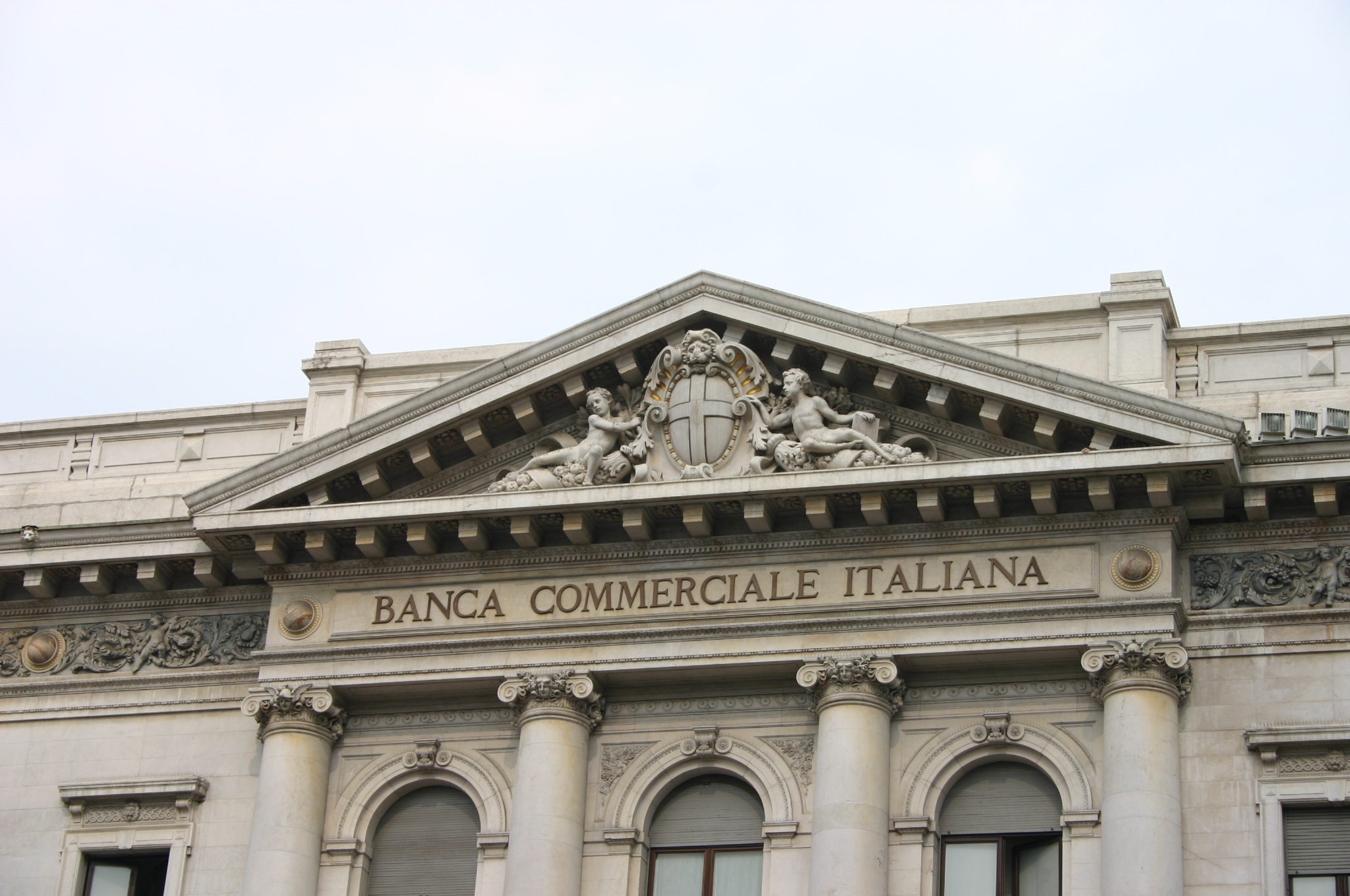
Coat of arms of Milan carved on the Palazzo della Banca Commerciale Italiana in Milan, which is located in Piazza della Scala

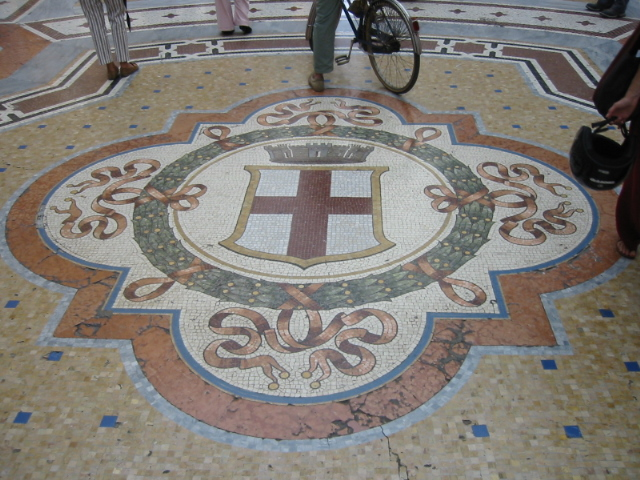
Coat of arms of Milan on the floor of the Galleria Vittorio Emanuele II

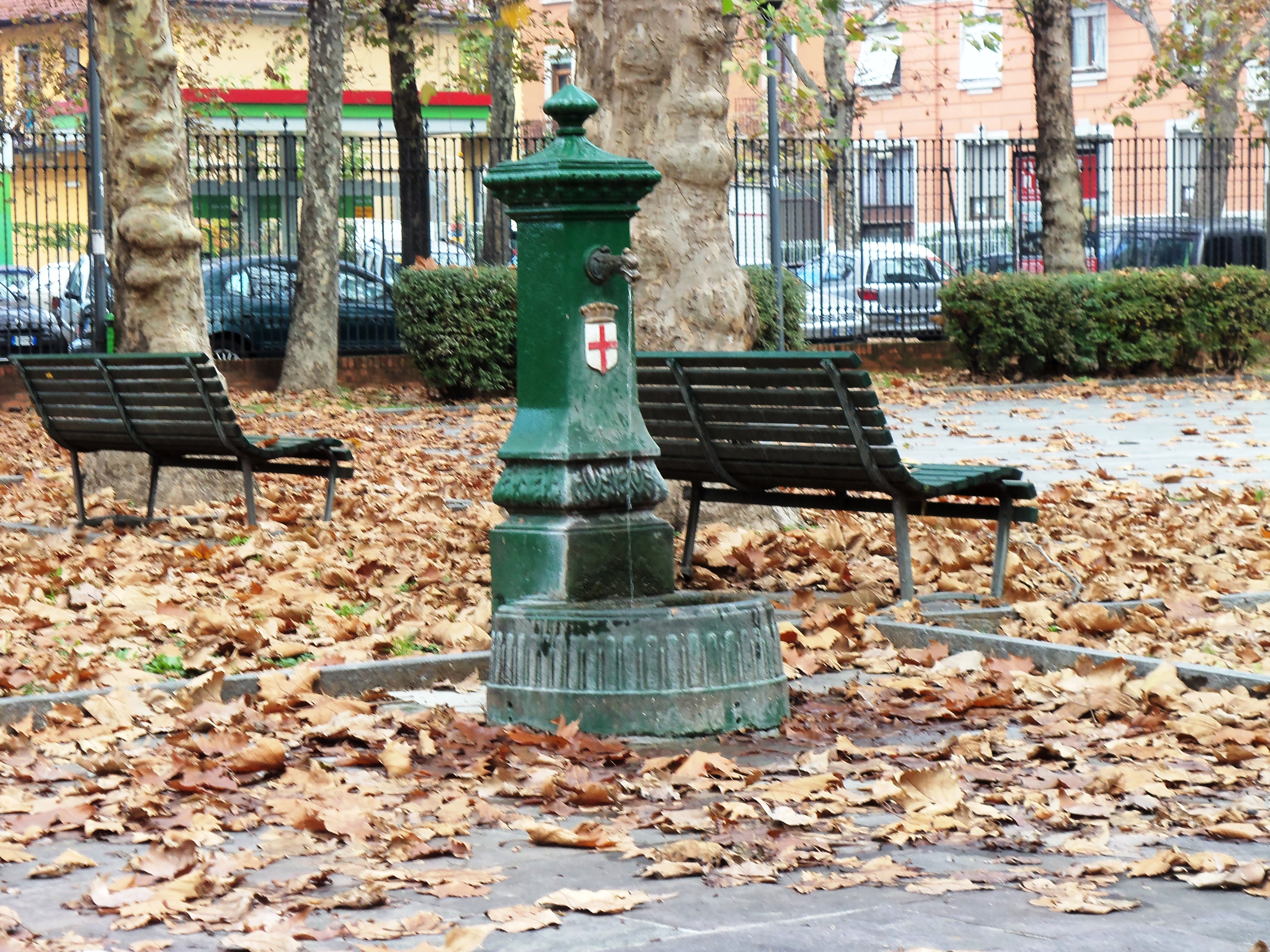
One of the cast iron fountains installed in Milan. (Note: Nicknamed green dragons for the shape of the faucet or widows for the inexhaustible rivulet that spouts from them, Milan's fountains have been unchanged since their first installation, which took place in Piazza della Scala in 1931. See "Le fontanelle" sul sito del comune di Milano) The city's coat of arms is depicted on them.

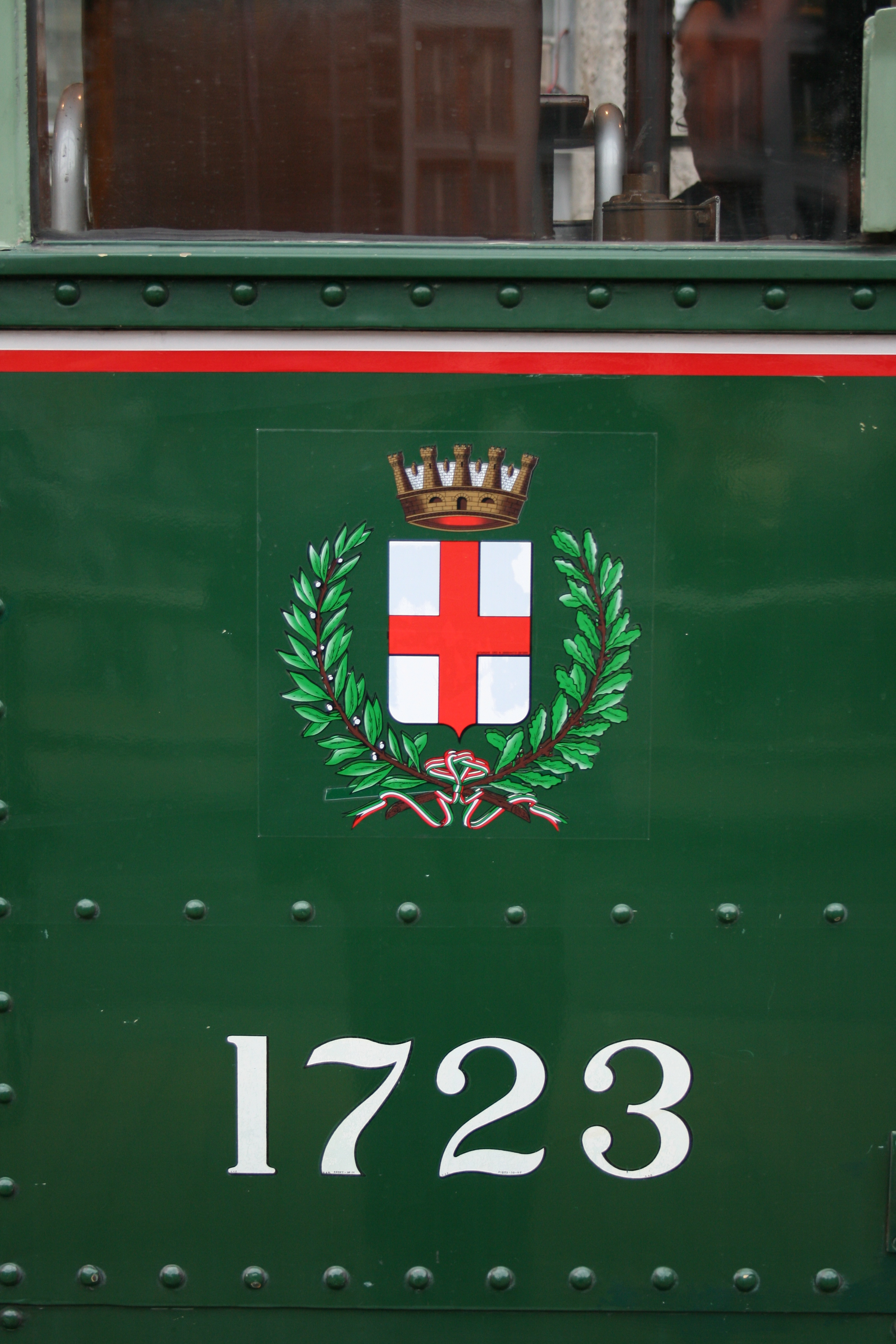
Milan coat of arms on the sides of a streetcar

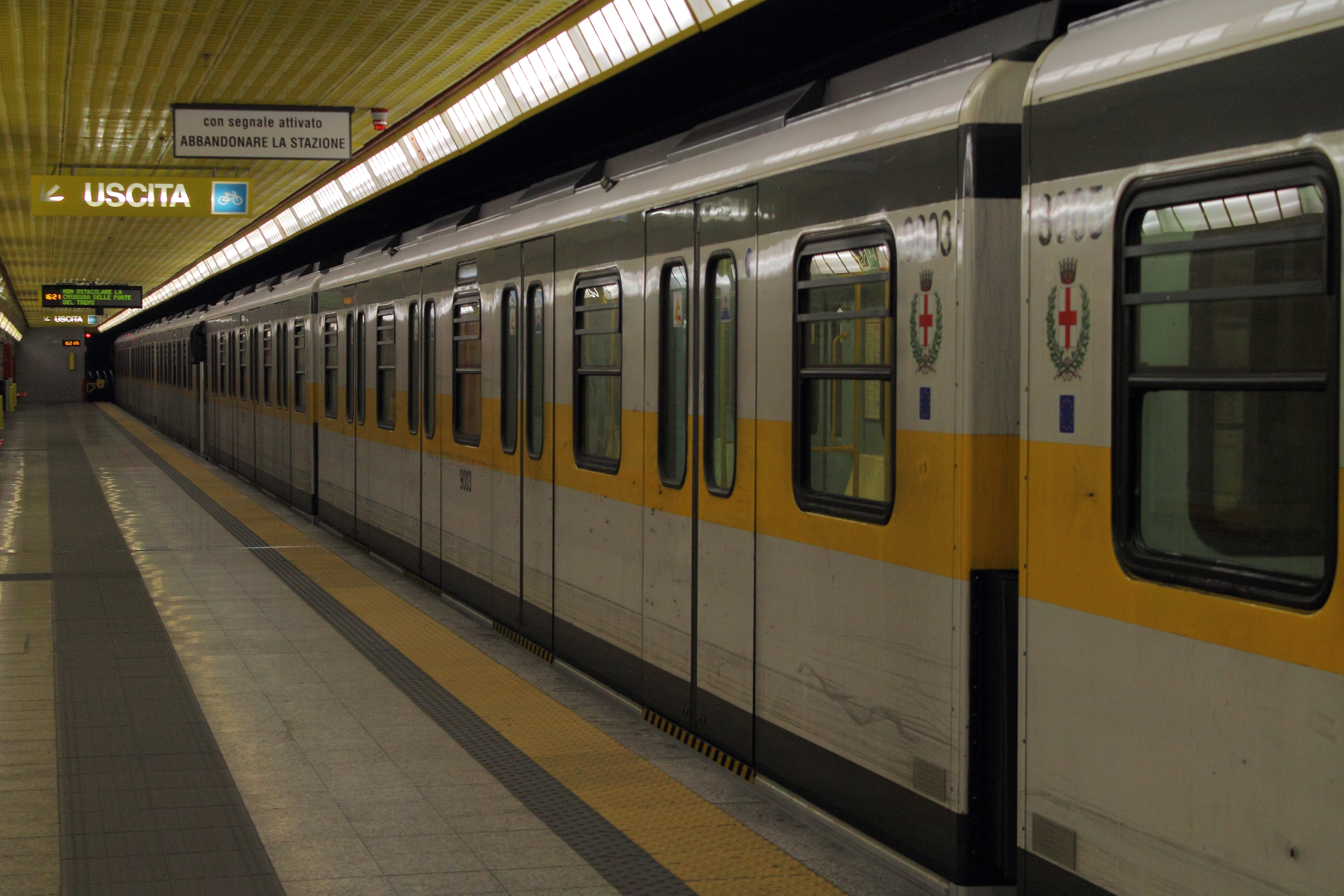
Coat of arms of Milan on the sides of an electric subway line 3 train.

== The coats of arms of the sestieri of Milan ==
The six sestieri of Milan (to which the six main gates of Milan were associated), into which the city was historically divided, also each had their own coat of arms, the first mention of which dates back to 1162:

Sestiere	Coat of arms	Blazon of the coat of arms	Reference gate	Notes on the coat of arms
Sestiere of Porta Comasina		Chequy gules and argent	Porta Comasina	The number of rows, seven or six, may vary depending on the depictions.
Sestiere of Porta Nuova		Party per cross argent and sable	Porta Nuova	Formerly party per cross argent and gules and before that sable a lion argent.
Sestiere of Porta Orientale		Argent a lion sable	Porta Orientale	Sometimes the lion is depicted armed and langued gules (previously the lion was chequy argent and sable, and before that there were three lions sable, passant over each other, on a white background).
Sestiere of Porta Romana		Gules	Porta Romana	-
Sestiere of Porta Ticinese		Argent, a three-legged stool gules, with three holes in the seat	Porta Ticinese	Previously the coat of arms was completely argent, without figures.
Sestiere of Porta Vercellina		Party per fess gules and argent	Porta Vercellina	-

== Other symbols of Milan ==
Other symbols of Milan, which are not officially recognized, are the half-woollen boar, the "Madonnina," the "biscione," and Meneghino.

=== The half-woollen boar ===
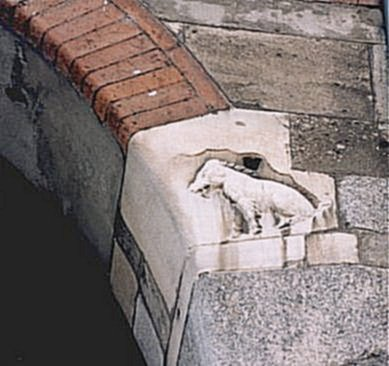
Bas-relief of the half-woollen boar on an impost in Milan's Palazzo della Ragione

[...] The Insubres had as their metropolis Mediolanum, which was formerly a village, now instead an important city across the Po almost at the foot of the Alps. [...]

— Strabo, Geographica, V, 1.6.

The first symbol of the city of Milan was the half-woollen boar, an animal linked to the legend of its founding. According to the ancient Roman tradition reported by Livy, the founding of Milan took place around 600 B.C. by the Celt Bellovesus, grandson of the ruler of the Bituriges Cubi, who settled in the middle of the plain, defeating the previous Etruscan populations. Legend would then trace its founding to the Celt Bellovesus and a half-woollen boar (in medio lanae: from which, according to this legend, the Latin place name Mediolanum would derive) that later became the symbol of Roman Milan. This legend was later revived in medieval times by Bonvesin de la Riva.

In contrast, according to modern historians, Milan was founded around 590 B.C., possibly under the name Medhelan, near a sanctuary by a Celtic tribe that was part of the Insubres group and belonged to the Golasecca culture. The ancient Celtic settlement, which was later renamed by the ancient Romans, as it is attested by Livy, Mediolanum, was then, from a topographical point of view, overlaid and replaced by the Roman one. The later Roman city was then in turn gradually overlaid and replaced by the medieval one. The urban center of Milan has thus steadily grown, until modern times, around the early Celtic core.

=== The Madonnina ===
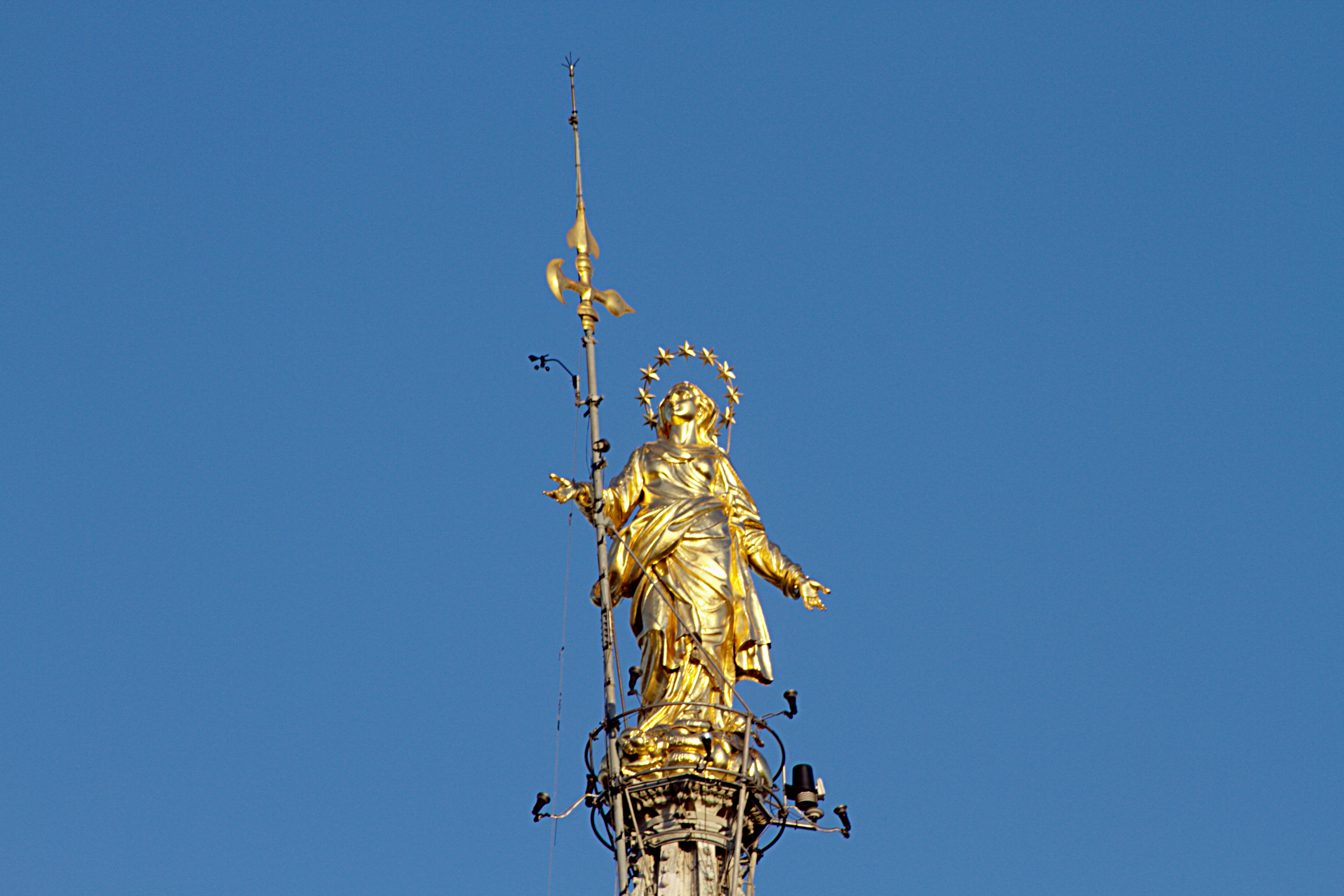
The Madonnina, a statue found at the top of Milan Cathedral

The Madonnina is a golden statue placed on the highest spire of Milan Cathedral representing Mary, mother of Jesus Christ. This statue is the protagonist of the Milanese dialect song "Oh mia bella Madonnina" by Giovanni D'Anzi, which is in fact considered the city's anthem:

[...] O mia bela Madonina,
che te brillet de lontan,
tuta d'ora e piscinina,
ti te dominet Milan.
Sota a ti se viv la vita,
se sta mai con i man in man [...]
[...] O my beautiful Madonnina,,
Shining from afar,
All golden and petite,
Thou rulest Milan.
Under you one lives life,
one never sits idly by [...]

— Giovanni D'Anzi, "Oh mia bella Madonnina"

=== The biscione ===
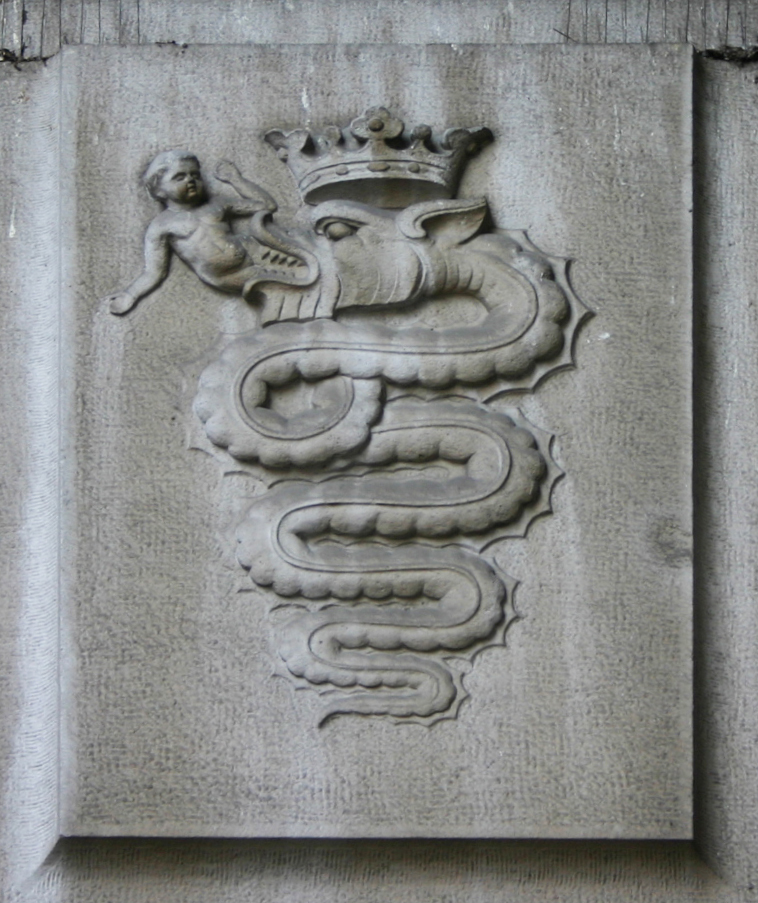
The biscione carved into the hallway of Milan's Central Station.

The biscione (in Milanese dialect el bisson), portrayed in the act of swallowing or protecting, depending on the interpretation, a child or a naked man (Note: A tradition dating back to Galvano Fiamma (14th century), has it that this coat of arms came from the image depicted on the helmet and shield of a Saracen shot down by Ottone Visconti during the First Crusade. However, this is a far-fetched tale, like the other reports by this historian about Lombard participation in the First Crusade (Giancarlo Andenna, Deus non voluit: i Lombardi alla prima crociata (1100-1101). Dal mito alla ricostruzione della realtà. Atti del Convegno Milano, 11-11 dicembre 1999, Milano, Vita e Pensiero, 2003, ISBN 88-343-0799-2, in partic. pp. 233-234). Another myth attributes the symbol's origin to a similar clash between Eriprando Visconti and a German knight in 1034. The first secure attestation of the symbol is 1226, when it was depicted on the crosier, "adorned with ivory vipers," of Ardengo Visconti, abbot of the monastery of Sant'Ambrogio (Romussi 1927, vol. II, p. 245). Another story, implausible for its anachronism, is reported by Petrarch: the symbol is said to have been adopted by Azzone Visconti, to whose helmet a viper entered while he was resting, but came out, upon putting it on, with its jaws wide open, without, however, biting him. Andenna (cit.) believes the origin is likely from episcopal symbols depicting a sea monster swallowing Jonah, a symbol of the resurrection.) and topped with a golden crown, (Note: The addition of the golden crown was granted in 1336 to Bruzio Visconti by the dukes of Austria (Romussi, loc. cit.).) was the symbol of the Visconti family, Lords and then Dukes of Milan between the 13th and 15th centuries. The biscione was later taken up by the Sforza family, a dynasty that ruled Milan in the 15th and 16th centuries, later remaining one of the most famous symbols of the city of Milan.

The figure of the "biscione" is mentioned by Dante Alighieri in the Divine Comedy as:

[...] The viper that leads the Milanese afield [...]

— Dante Alighieri, Divine Comedy, canto eight of the Purgatorio

Two meanings could be associated with these verses: "the Milanese army camps only where the biscione was set," i.e., the banner of the Visconti family, or "the biscione that the Milanese keep in their military camp."

Among many modern uses, the biscione was included in the logo of the Italian car manufacturer Alfa Romeo, which was founded in Milan in 1910. "La bissa," another dialectal appellation given by the Milanese to the "biscione," is one of the symbols of Inter, a Milanese soccer team, and has been taken up by the Fininvest company, founded in 1978 by Silvio Berlusconi: in the latter case, the representation of the boy has been "softened" by replacing the latter with a flower coming out of the snake's mouth, all highly stylized.

=== Meneghino ===
E mì interrogatus ghe responditt.
Sont Meneghin Tandœuggia,
Ciamæ par sora nomm el Tananan,
Del condamm Marchionn ditt el Sginsgiva;
Sont servitor del sior Pomponi Gonz,
C'al è trent agn che'l servj
And I, interrogatus, (Note: Interrogatus is a Latin word form used in official records of interrogations.) answered:
I am Meneghino Babbeo (Note: Tandœuggia is Babbuasso according to Arrighi (1896, p. 743).)
Called by the nickname Ciampichino (Note: Tananan is Scricciolo or Ciampichino according to Arrighi (1896, p. 743).)
Of the late (Note: Condamm is a mispronunciation of the Latin quondam used in official acts.) Marchionne known as the Gingiva;
I am servant of Mr. Pomponio Gonzo
Whom I have served for thirty years.

— Meneghino appears in court in Il falso filosofo (1698), act III, scene XIV

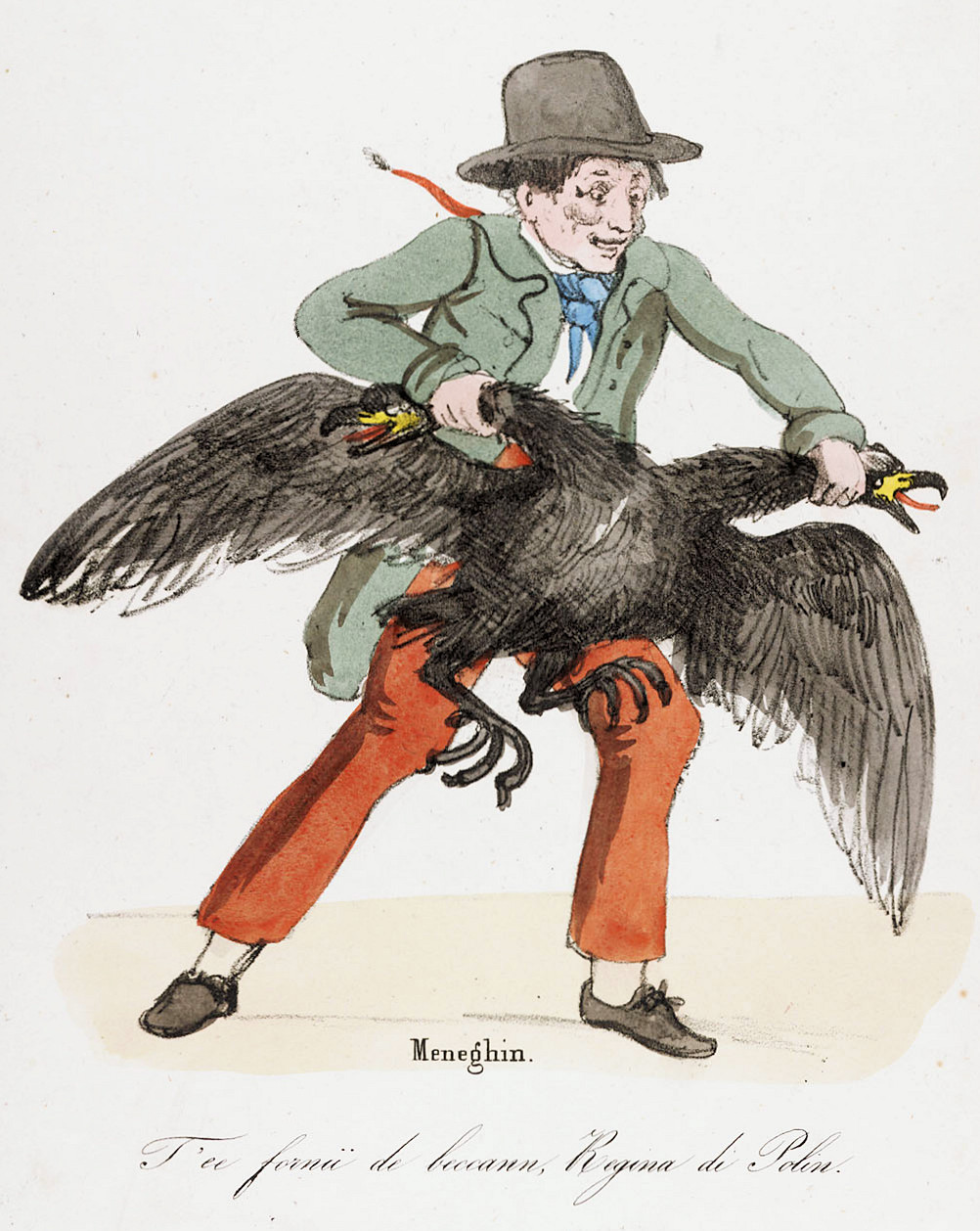
Satirical print after the Five Days of Milan: Meneghino (a character from the Milanese theater who later became a mask in the commedia dell'arte) pulls the necks of the Habsburg double-headed eagle, exclaiming, "You're done pecking at us, queen of the turkeys."

Meneghino is a character from Milanese theater who later became a mask in the commedia dell'arte. It supplanted the older and more traditional one of "Baltramm de Gaggian." "Meneghino," which is the diminutive of the name Domenico (in Milanese dialect Domenegh or Menegh), is sometimes used, as an adjective, as a substitute for "Milanese" (see, for example, the well-known cultural institution Famiglia meneghina). Meneghino's wife is Cecca, another famous character of Milanese theater.

== See also ==
- Biscione
- Saint George's Cross
- Madonnina (statue)
- Meneghino
- Scrofa semilanuta

== Bibliography ==
- Cletto Arrighi (1896). Dizionario milanese-italiano, col repertorio italiano-milanese: premiato nel concorso governativo del 1890-93. Milano.
- Bologna, Giulia (1989). Milano e il suo stemma. Milano: Comune di Milano. Archivio Storico Civico e Biblioteca Trivulziana.
- Pagani, Gentile (1903). Cenno storico dello stemma di Milano. Dedicato all'onorevole consiglio comunale della città di Milano. Milano: Stabilimento tipografico Enrico Reggiani.
