= Madonnina =

Madonnina (Italian for 'Little Madonna') may refer to:

- Madonnina (painting), by Italian artist Roberto Ferruzzi
- Madonnina (statue), which sits atop Milan Cathedral in Italy
  - Derby della Madonnina, a football rivalry match between A.C. Milan and Internazionale Milano, named after the statue
  - "Oh mia bella Madonnina", a Milanese song

== See also ==
- La madonnina d'oro, a 1949 film by Luigi Carpentieri and Ladislao Vajda
