= Giuseppe Secchi =

Italian footballer

Personal information
- Date of birth: 16 April 1931
- Place of birth: Concorezzo, Kingdom of Italy
- Date of death: 11 January 2018 (aged 86)
- Place of death: Concorezzo, Italy
- Position: Striker

Senior career*
Years	Team	Apps	(Gls)
1949–1950	Villasanta	19	(4)
1950–1951	Seregno	29	(8)
1951–1952	Siracusa	24	(9)
1952–1953	Padova	19	(4)
1953–1955	Triestina	57	(16)
1955–1957	Udinese	62	(40)
1957–1958	Roma	16	(2)
1958–1959	Atalanta	17	(5)
1959–1963	Triestina	122	(17)
1963–1965	Fanfulla	46	(2)
- * Club domestic league appearances and goals

Giuseppe Secchi (16 April 1931 in Concorezzo – 11 January 2018 in Concorezzo) was an Italian professional footballer who made more than 400 appearances in the Italian leagues.

He played for four seasons (101 games, 36 goals) in the Serie A with Triestina, Udinese and Roma.

His most successful two years were spent with Udinese, when he scored 22 goals (coming as the second-best scorer of the Serie B) and 18 goals (second-best scorer of the Serie A), respectively.
