= Scrofa semilanuta =

City emblem of Milan, Italy

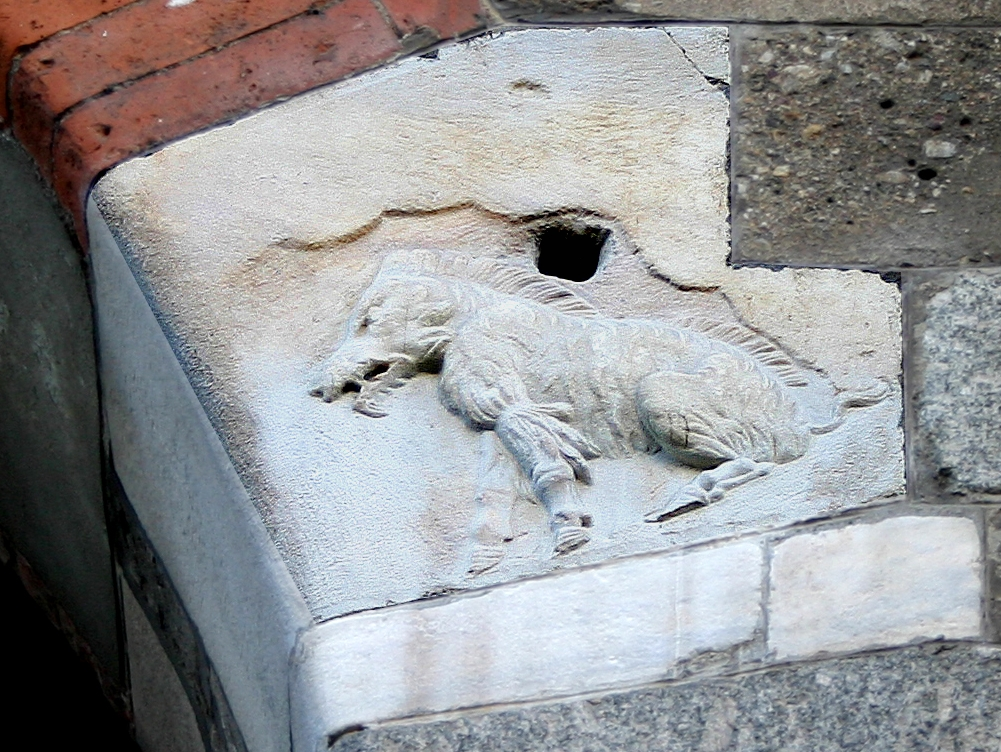
Bas relief representing the scrofa semilanuta on the walls of Palazzo della Ragione, Milan

The scrofa semilanuta (English: "half-woollen boar") is an ancient emblem of the city of Milan, Italy, dating back at least to the Middle Ages — and, according to a local legend, to the very foundation of Milan. Several ancient sources (including Sidonius Apollinaris, Datius, and, more recently, Andrea Alciato) have argued that the scrofa semilanuta is connected to the etymology of the ancient name of Milan, "Mediolanum", and this is still occasionally mentioned in modern sources, although this interpretation has long been dismissed by scholars.

The adoption of the half-woolly sow as an emblem of Milan is associated to a legend about the foundation of the city. According to this legend (which partially draws from Livy's writings), the founder of Milan was a Gaul prince named Belloveso. Belloveso reached the Po Valley following a vision he had had in a dream, where a goddess showed him the place where the city would rise. In this dream, he saw a sow with unusually long wool on the front half of its body. Other ancient sources (most notably the aforementioned Alciato, who in turns credits Ambrose for his account) report that the half-woolly sow is actually a sort of Chimera — half boar and half ram — and that the emblem came about when the Bituriges and the Aedui, having as their emblems a ram and a boar respectively, joined in the Po Valley.

The origin of the legend of scrofa semilanuta and the circumstances of its adoption as an emblem of Milan are a very controversial matter for scholars. A key element of this controversy is a bas relief affixed to the walls of the Palazzo della Ragione, former broletto (administrative building) of the medieval commune of Milan. The bas relief is reportedly a medieval copy of an older one, found during the excavations when the Palazzo was built (1228–1233). It has been argued that the legend of the scrofa semilanuta, in its current form, might have come about as a consequence of that particular finding as well as the patriotic enthusiasm for the newly conquered independence of Milan as a commune, elaborating on the old legends about the etymology of "Mediolanum". The bas relief itself might just represent a boar, which in turn was a very common emblem in Western Europe. In any case, the "scrofa semilanuta" was thereafter adopted as the main emblem of Milan, at least until the advent of the biscione of the House of Visconti. Another (more recent) representation of the "scrofa semilanuta" is found in the internal courtyard of Palazzo Marino (Milan's city hall).

== See also ==
- Symbols of Milan
