= El Biscella =

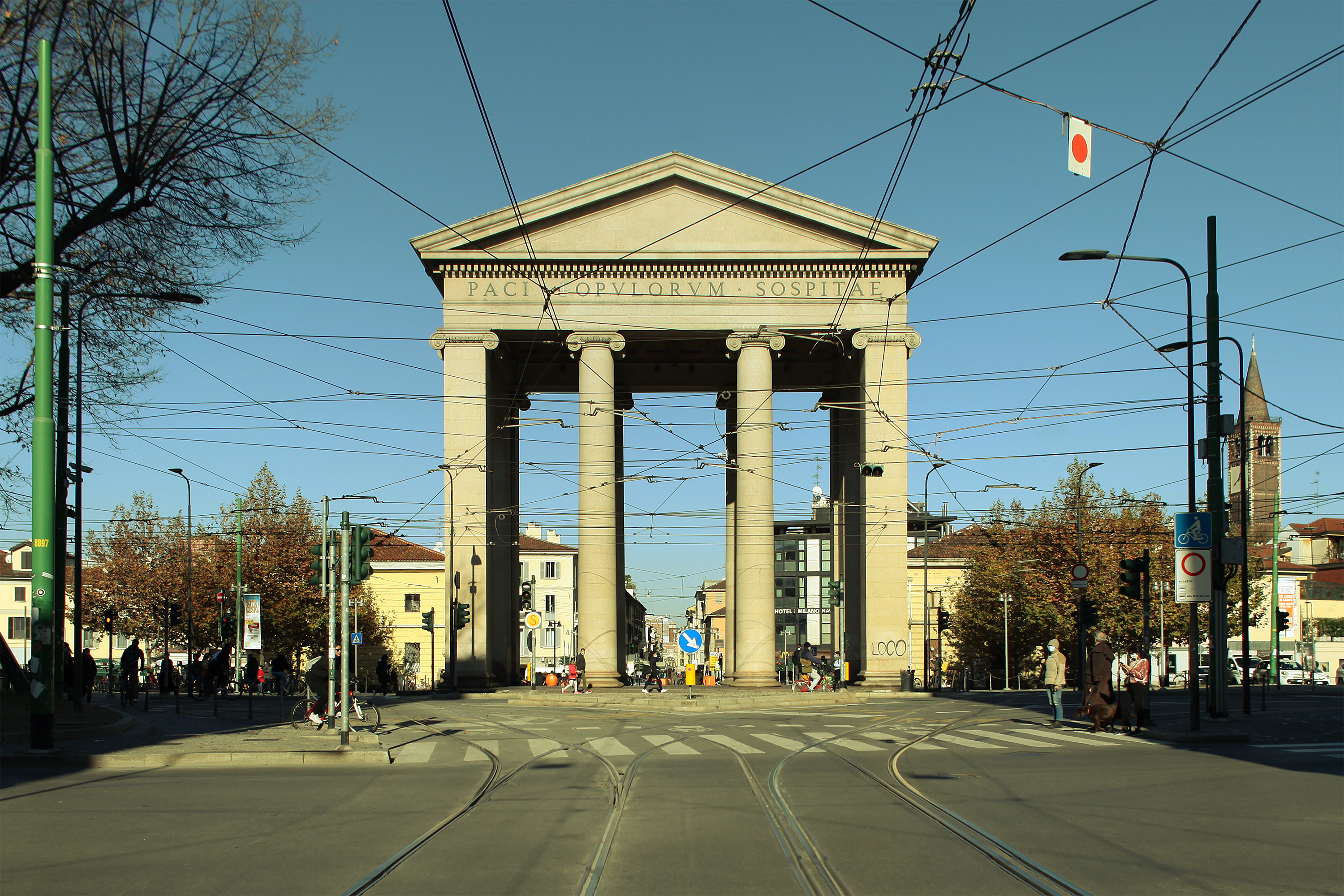

Single by Giovanni D'Anzi
- Written: 1969
- Genre: Folk music
- Length: 2:20
- Label: Meldy Fonola
- Songwriter(s): Giovanni D'Anzi; Alfredo Bracchi

"El Biscella" (transl. bully boy) is an Italian song in Milanese dialect of Lombard from the early 1960s composed by Giovanni D'Anzi and Alfredo Bracchi.

== History ==
"Biscella" is a Milanese word meaning "curly" (derived from bisc-bish, meaning hedgehog), a kind of bully who tries to intimidate people, but whose clumsy manners and extravagant costumes make him more comical than dangerous.

The song tells the story of a "biscella" that lives in Porta Ticinese neighbourhood who goes to parties, and that everyone behind his back laughs for his ridiculous clothes and his awkward way of dancing.
