= City status =

Title granted by a monarch or government

City status is a symbolic and legal designation given by a monarch, national or subnational government. A municipality may receive city status because it already has the qualities of a city, or because it has some special purpose.

Historically, city status was a privilege granted by royal letters of patent. Sovereigns could establish cities by decree, e.g. Helsinki, regardless of what was in the location beforehand. Also, with the establishment of federal governments, the new capital could be established from scratch, e.g. Brasília, without going through organic growth from a village to a town.

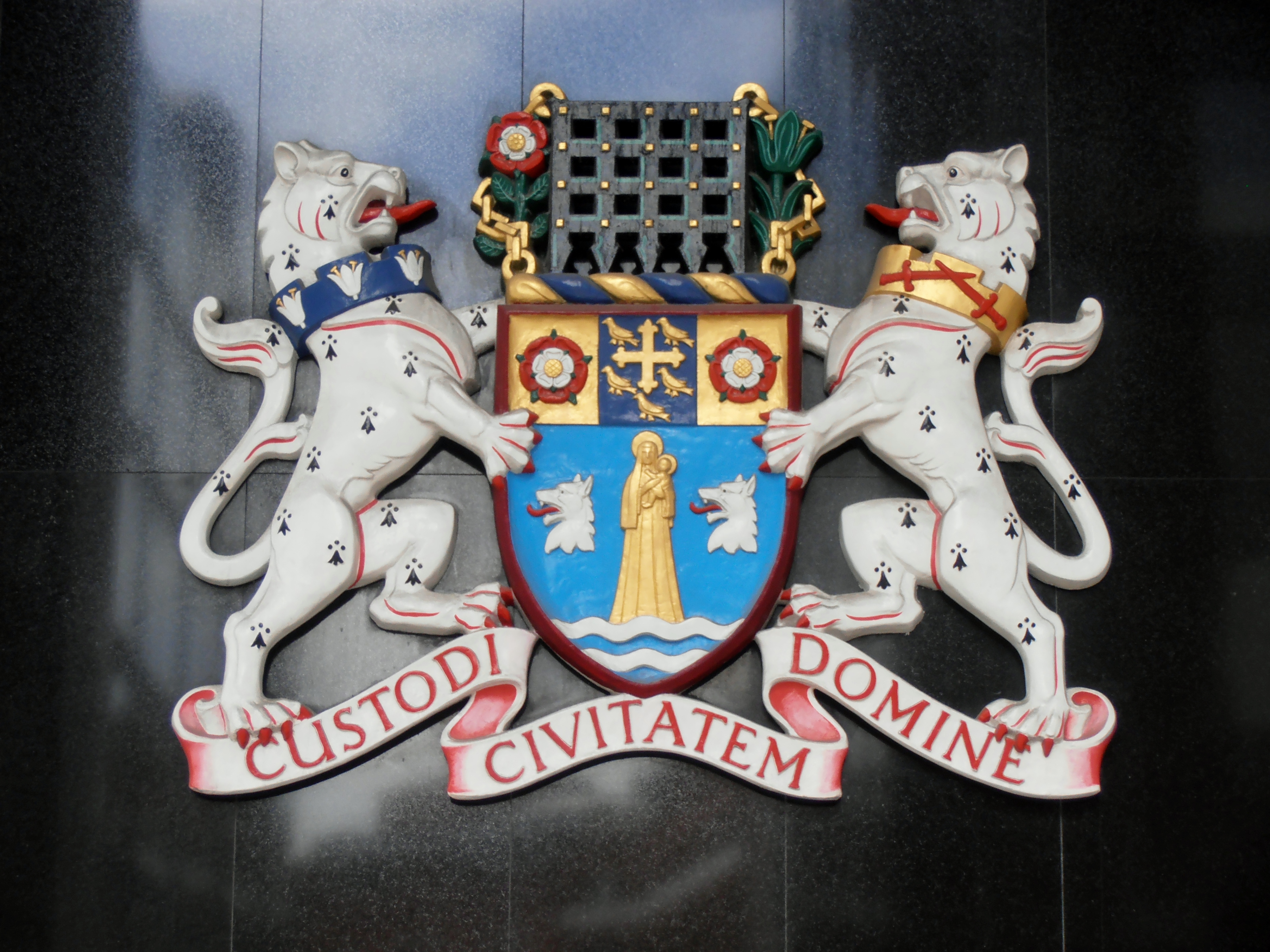
Coat of arms of the City of Westminster, a part of London which has its own city status

Historically, British city status was often conferred on settlements with a diocesan cathedral; in more recent times towns apply to receive city status by letters patent at times of national celebration. Similarly, city status in Italy is granted by decree of the president (and before 1946 by the king of Italy) in recognition of historical, cultural or demographic merit. In the United States city can be used for much smaller settlements.

The government of China in 1982–1997 upgraded many counties to cities by decree, thereby increasing their city count from 250 to more than 650 during this period. Almost 15% of the counties in China became cities. The new "cities" may include large rural areas as well as urban areas. The upgrade was considered desirable by local governments because the new status provides additional powers of taxation and administration, the right to expand the size of government, and an increase in the proportion of land which could be converted from agriculture to buildings.

== See also ==
- City status in Belgium
- City status in Indonesia
- City status in Ireland
- City status in Italy
- City status in Sweden
- City status in Ukraine
- City status in the United Kingdom
- City rights in the Low Countries
- Statutory city (Czech Republic)
- City status (Slovakia)
- City with special status (Ukraine)
- Federal cities of Russia; City of federal subject significance
- Classification of Indian cities
- Cities and new towns in Hong Kong
- Cities of Japan
- Cities of the Philippines
- Cities of Bulgaria
- List of cities in Alberta
- List of cities in Buenos Aires Province
- List of cities in Australia
- List of cities and towns in Bangladesh
- List of cities in China
- List of cities in Croatia
- List of Israeli settlements with city status in the West Bank
- List of cities in Malaysia
- List of cities in Malta
- List of cities in Moldova
- List of towns and cities in Norway
- List of cities in South Korea
- City status in Spain
- List of cities in Taiwan
- List of cities in Vietnam
