= Alfredo Bracchi =

Italian author

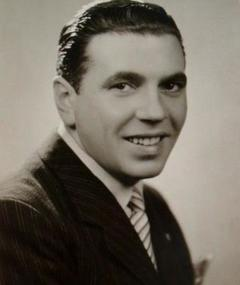

Background information
- Born: 30 December 1897
- Origin: Milan, Italy
- Died: 11 October 1976 (aged 78)
- Occupations: Composer; Lyricist
- Instrument: Piano

Alfredo Bracchi (30 December 1897 – 11 October 1976) was a versatile Italian writer, whose production ranged from song lyrics to movie scripts.

Bracchi was born in Milan, Italy. Between the 1930s and 1950s he and Giovanni D'Anzi formed a very prolific pair of songwriters. They worked for radio, cinema and theater productions. Several of their songs were great hits. Among them Ma le gambe, Bambina innamorata, Ma l'amore no, Ti parlerò d'amor, El Biscella. The grave is inside Civico Mausoleo Palanti at Cimitero Monumentale di Milano.

== Selected filmography ==
=== Screenwriter ===
- (1950) Songs in the Streets directed by Mario Landi

=== Actor ===
- (1939) It Always Ends That Way as Il paroliere.
