= Oldrado da Tresseno =

Italian politician (died 1233)

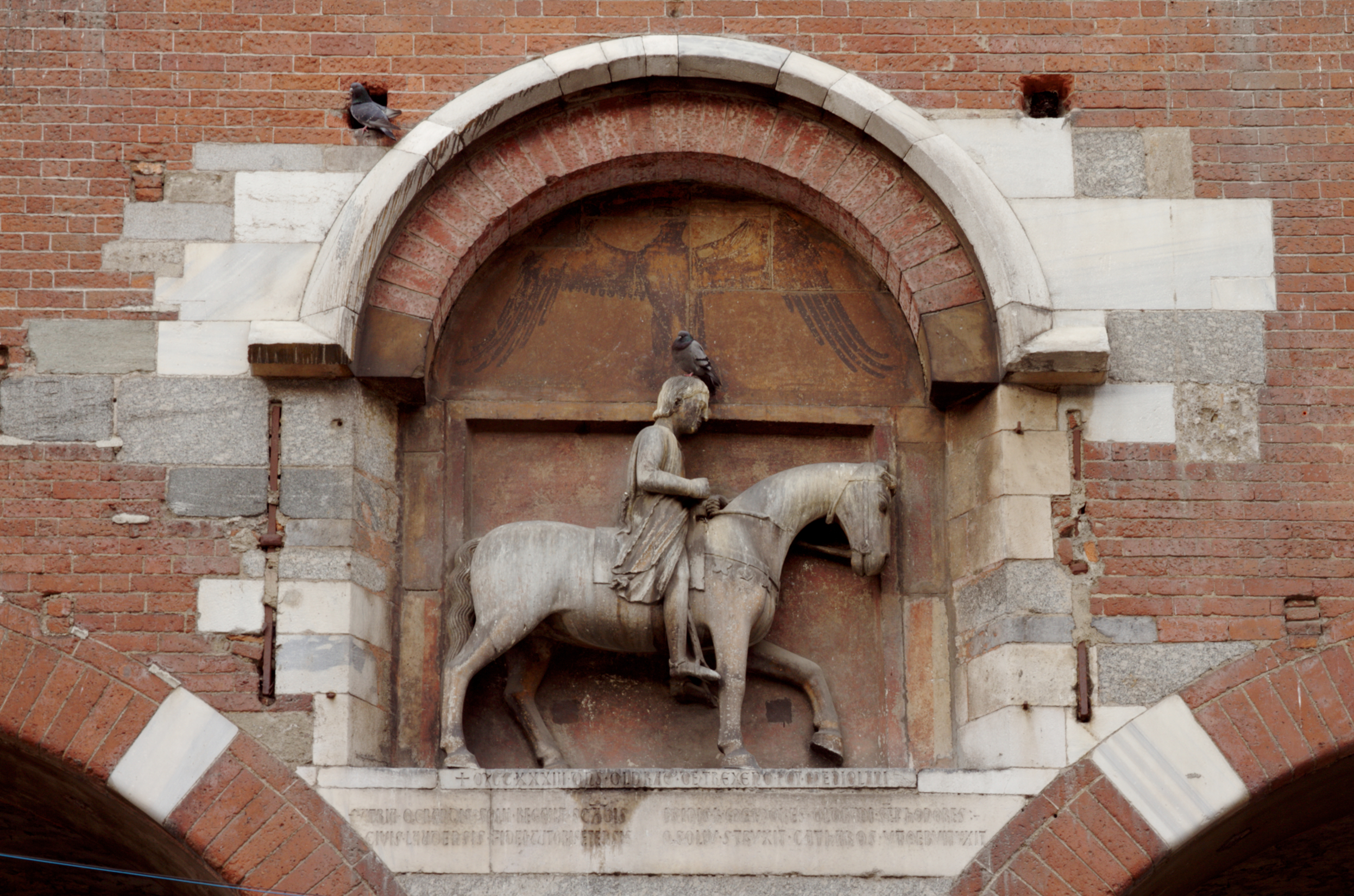
The relief representing Oldrado, Palazzo della Ragione, Milan

Oldrado da Tresseno (died 1233) was an Italian politician, podestà (mayor) of Milan in the 13th century. He is responsible for restructuring Piazza dei Mercanti (former city center of Milan in the Middle Ages, located next to what is now Piazza del Duomo) and ordering the construction of Palazzo della Ragione, a prominent historic building of Milan, which served as a broletto (government seat) in the Middle Ages. He is also remembered as a fierce prosecutor of the Cathar heretics.

Details of Oldrado's life are largely missing. Although he is referred to in medieval texts as "a citizen of Lodi", it is disputed whether he was born there or in Dresano (a small town near Melegnano). He was a close friend to inquisitor Pietro da Verona and actively cooperated with the Inquisition in prosecuting heretics, especially the believers of the Church of Concorezzo, a very active Cathar group that was supported by the bishop of Concorezzo (a town North-East of Milan, near Monza) and by local feudatory Filippo Confalonieri.

A Romanesque relief representing Oldrado is found on one of the columns of Palazzo della Ragione in Milan; it bears a Latin inscription that reads:

Anno Domini 1233. To the podestà of Milan, Oldrado di Tresseno. When you pass through the regal portico of the great palace, you will always remember the merits of podestà Oldrado, citizen of Lodi, defender and sword of the faith, who built the palace and burnt, as he had to, the Cathars.
