= Giovanni D'Anzi =

Italian pianist and composer (1906–1974)

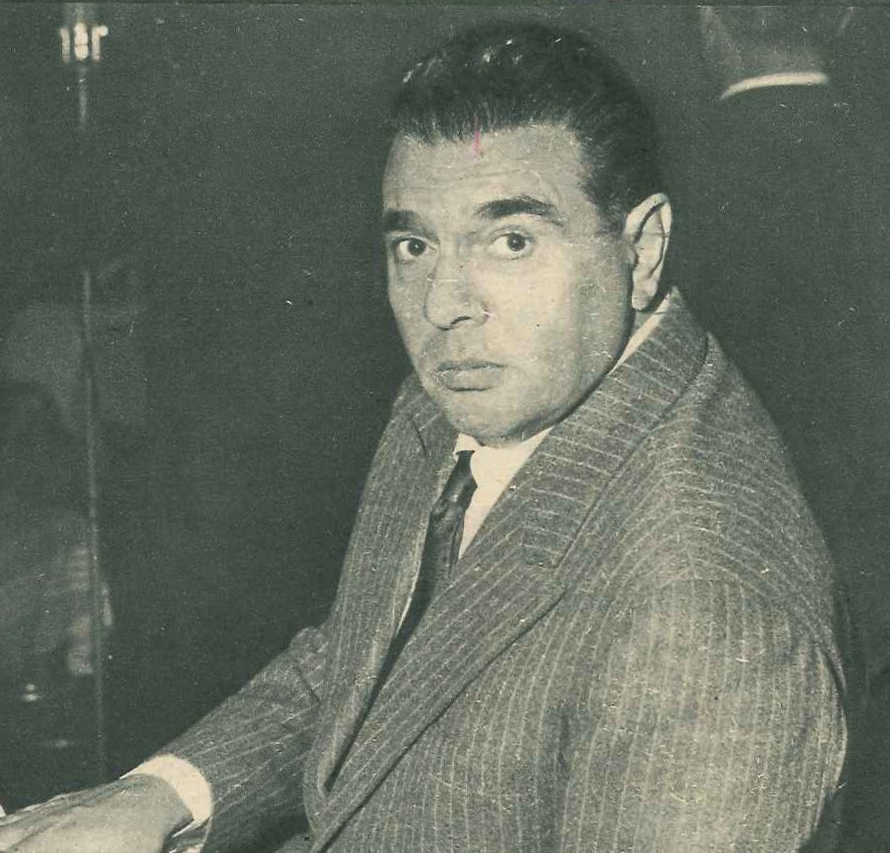

Background information
- Born: 1 January 1906
- Origin: Milan, Italy
- Died: 15 April 1974 (aged 68)
- Occupation: Composer
- Instrument: Piano
- Years active: 1939–1960

Giovanni D'Anzi (1 January 1906 – 15 April 1974) was an Italian songwriter.

== Biography ==
D'Anzi was born in Milan. In 1935 he wrote music and lyrics of "Oh mia bella Madonnina" ("My beautiful little Madonna"), a song dedicated to his hometown which soon became very popular and a sort of unofficial city anthem.

Between the 1930s and 1950s Giovanni D'Anzi and Alfredo Bracchi formed a very prolific pair of songwriters. They worked for radio, cinema and theater productions. Several of their songs were great hits. Among them "Ma le gambe", "Bambina innamorata", "Ma l'amore no", "Voglio vivere così", "Ti parlerò d'amor". His song "Malinconia d'amore" has been sung by both Luciano Pavarotti and José Carreras.

Most of their songs were in Milanese dialect, and described ironically characters of the past in Milan, for example "La gagarella del Biffi Scala" ("The Spoiled Daughter of Mr Biffi Scala") and "El Tumiami de Loret" ("The Braggart from Piazzale Loreto"), "El Biscella" ("The Silly-Bully Boy").

During the 1960s Giovanni D'Anzi retired from the musical scene. He moved to Liguria and took up painting.

He died at Santa Margherita Ligure. Milan's local authorities included him in the list of important Milanese people at the Monumental Cemetery in the Civico Mausoleo Palanti.

In 1990 to his memory a plaque was hung in Galleria del Corso in Milan, in front of the place where he worked and near where he lived, the plaque reads "once upon a time in this gallery there was a king: Giovanni D'anzi, he wrote magic notes, and the sweetest serenade he sang for Milan, "Oh mia bella Madonina".

In his memory, since 1995, the Gruppo Editoriale Curci under the auspices of the Comune di Milano and the association "Amici della musica e dello spettacolo" organizes the annual Award Giovanni D'Anzi, singing event in Milanese dialect. The presenter is Tony Martucci historical event, with Liliana Feldmann in the years 1992 and 1993, with Roberta Potrich in the years 2004 and 2005.

== Selected filmography themes ==
- Department Store (1939)
- Nonna Felicità (1939)
- Nothing New Tonight (1942)
- La vita è bella (1943)
- Anything for a Song (1943)
- Annabella's Adventure (1943)
- Tutta la città canta (1945)
- Departure at Seven (1946)
- Solo per te Lucia (1952)
- It Was She Who Wanted It! (1953)
- Assi alla ribalta (1954)
- L'ultimo amante (1955)
