= Concorezzo =

- Comune
- Comune di Concorezzo
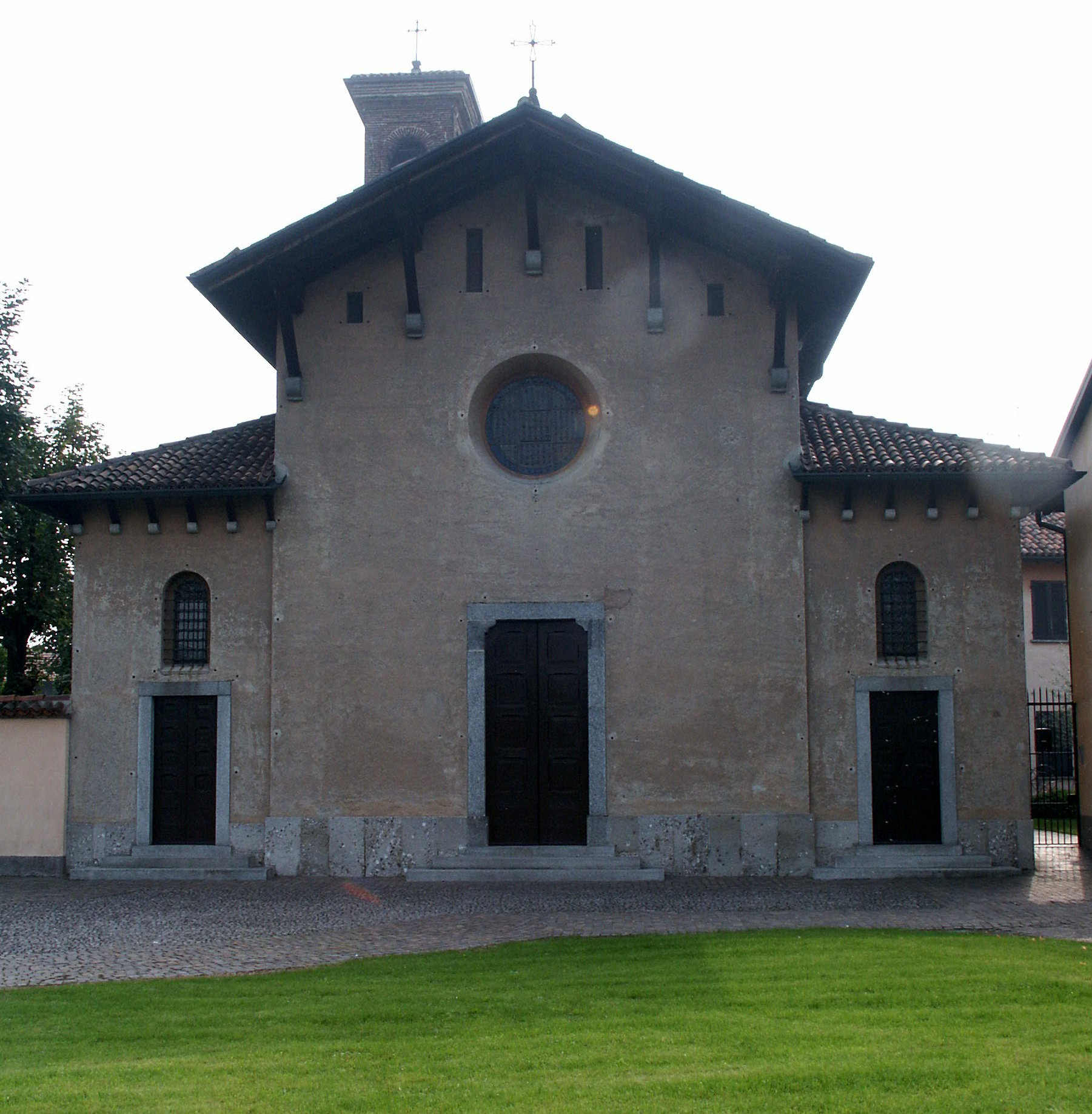
- Church of St. Eugenius

- Coat of arms

- Location within Italy Location within Lombardy
- Coordinates: 45°36′N 9°20′E
- Country: Italy
- Region: Lombardy
- Province: Monza and Brianza (MB)
- Frazioni: Rancate

Government
  - Mayor: Mauro Capitanio (Lega, NoiPerConcorezzo)

Area
  - Total: 8.5 km^{2} (3.3 sq mi)
- Elevation: 171 m (561 ft)

Population (2009)
  - Total: 15,178
  - Density: 1,800/km^{2} (4,600/sq mi)
- Demonym: Concorezzesi
- Time zone: UTC+1 (CET)
  - Summer (DST): UTC+2 (CEST)
- Postal code: 20863
- Dialing code: 039
- Website: Official website

Concorezzo (Milanese: Cuncuress) is a comune (municipality) in the Province of Monza and Brianza in the Italian region Lombardy, located about 20 kilometres (12 mi) northeast of Milan. It received the honorary title of city with a presidential decree on 25 September 1989.

Concorezzo borders the following municipalities: Arcore, Vimercate, Monza, Villasanta, Agrate Brianza. In the 13th century it was one of the major centre of the Cathars in northern Italy, until they were annihilated by the podestà of Milan, Oldrado da Tresseno.

== Immigration ==
- Demographic Statistics

- Number of immigrants at 2009 (the first five for nationality)
  - Romania: 195
  - Morocco: 191
  - Ecuador: 169
  - Albania: 110
  - Peru: 87

== Gallery ==
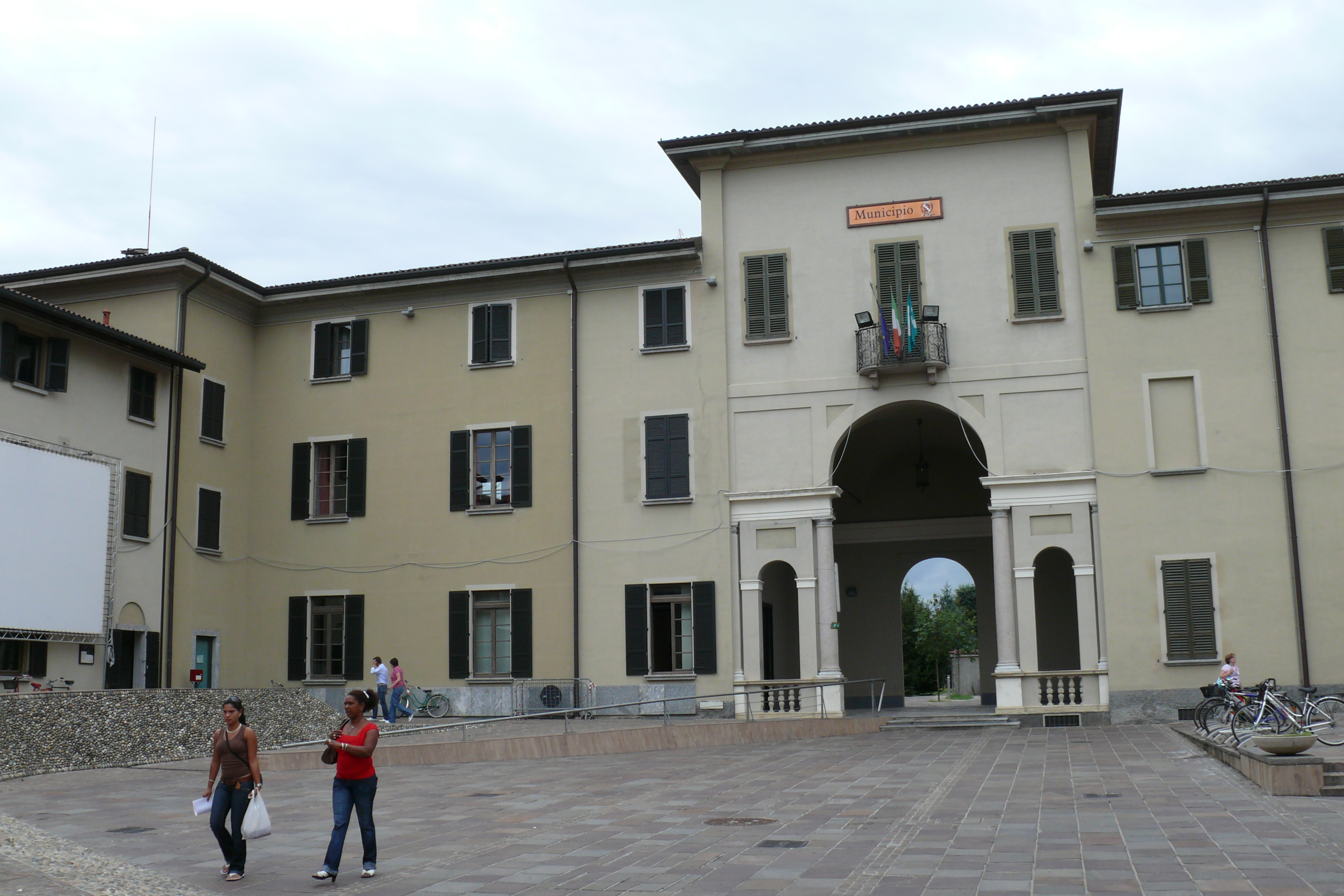
City Hall
