= City status in Italy =

City status in Italy is granted by the president of Italy (or by the king of Italy before 1946) to select municipalities in virtue of their historical, artistic, civic or demographic importance, and might or might not meet the generally accepted definition of cities. Although it carries no special rights, the city status can be a marker of prestige and confer local pride.

== Legislative practice ==
According to current law, the Legislative Decree 18 August 2000, n. 267, in the Official Gazette of the Italian Republic, 28 September 2000 states that “The title of city can be granted with a Decree of the President of the Republic on the proposal of the Minister of the Interior to municipalities that are famous for their memories, historical monuments and for their current importance.” This approach reiterates what was previously established by article 32 of Royal Decree no. 651 of 7 June 1943 and by the law n. 142 of 8 June 1990.

Moreover, numerous municipalities (especially the most ancient and significant cities) acquired the designation through official grants from governments before the Italian unification and continue to uphold it. Some cities proudly possess the title through legislative decrees of pre-unification states, or they lay claim to it due to deeply rooted and uninterrupted traditions. In certain instances, titles bestowed by pre-unification states have been validated through regulations of the Italian Republic.

The autonomous region of Friuli-Venezia Giulia regulates the granting of the title of City with the regional law 12 February 2003 which provides in article 4: "by decree of the President of the Region, on proposal of the regional councilor for local autonomies, the title of "City" may be granted to the municipalities that request it, after the conditions of comma 2. are met".

== Heraldry ==
Mural crown of Italian cities

Municipalities awarded the title of city use a mural crown formed by a golden circle opened by eight posterns (five visible) supporting eight towers (of which five visible), joined by wall curtains, the all in gold and walled in black. The technical details are regulated by article 5 of the Prime Minister's Decree of 28.01.2011. The coats of arms are assigned either by decree of the President of the Council of Ministers or by decree of the President of Italy (DPR) (depending on whether the coat of arms is recognized as antique or granted ex novo). However, this is not the case in South Tyrol, where all the municipal coats of arms follow German tradition and therefore no use of any crown is envisaged.

== See also ==
- City status
- City status in the United Kingdom
- City status in Ireland
- City status in Belgium
