= Palazzo della Ragione, Milan =

Historical building in Milan Italy

Coordinates: 45°27′53.54″N 9°11′16.16″E

Palazzo della Ragione
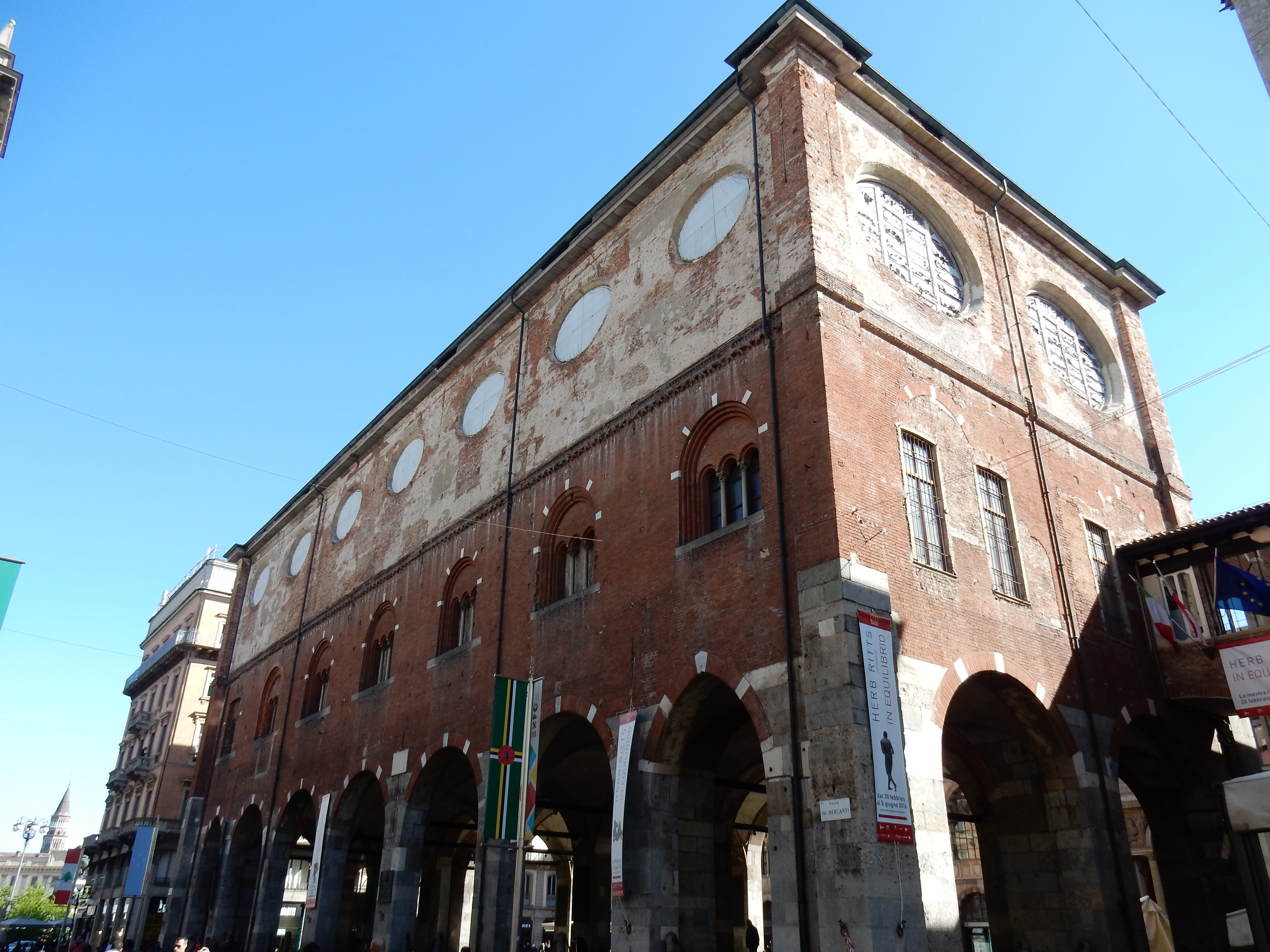
- Palazzo della Ragione.
- Interactive map of the Palazzo della Ragione area

General information
- Location: Milan, Italy
- Construction started: 1228
- Client: Podestà Aliprando Faba

Design and construction
- Architect: Vincenzo Seregni

The Palazzo della Ragione ("Palace of Reason") is a historic building in Milan, Italy, located in Piazza Mercanti, facing the Loggia degli Osii. Built in the 13th century, it originally served as a broletto—an administrative and judicial building. As the second broletto constructed in Milan, it is also known as the Broletto Nuovo ("New Broletto").

The palace features a relief of Oldrado da Tresseno, the podestà of Milan known for his harsh prosecution of Cathar heretics. Another notable element is the bas-relief of the scrofa semilanuta ("half-woolly sow"), which has been the subject of much scholarly debate concerning the foundation and early symbolism of Milan.

== History ==
The building was constructed between 1228 and 1233 for podestà Oldrado da Tresseno. It maintained a central role in the administrative and public life of Milan until the late 18th century. In 1773, under Empress Maria Theresa, it was restored and enlarged to serve as legal archives. The structural changes were designed by architect Francesco Croce, who added a new upper floor with large round windows and restyled the whole building based on Neoclassic canons. Other major modifications of the buildings were done in 1854 by architect Enrico Terzaghi; these included glass panes that closed the ground floor ambulatory, which was reopened between 1905 and 1907.

Between 1866 and 1870, the building housed the headquarters of the Banca Popolare di Milano, a major Milanese bank, but thereafter returned to its function as a legal archives seat until 1970. In 1978, Marco Dezzi Bardeschi restored the building again, but he strongly opposed any proposal of structural change, including that of removing the upper floor added by Croce.

Palazzo della Ragione inspired the design of another renowned building in the Milanese area, the Arengario of Monza.

== Sources ==
- Oscar Pedro Melano, Milano di terracotta e mattoni, Mazzotta, 2002.
