= Oh mia bella Madonnina =

"O mia bella Madonnina"
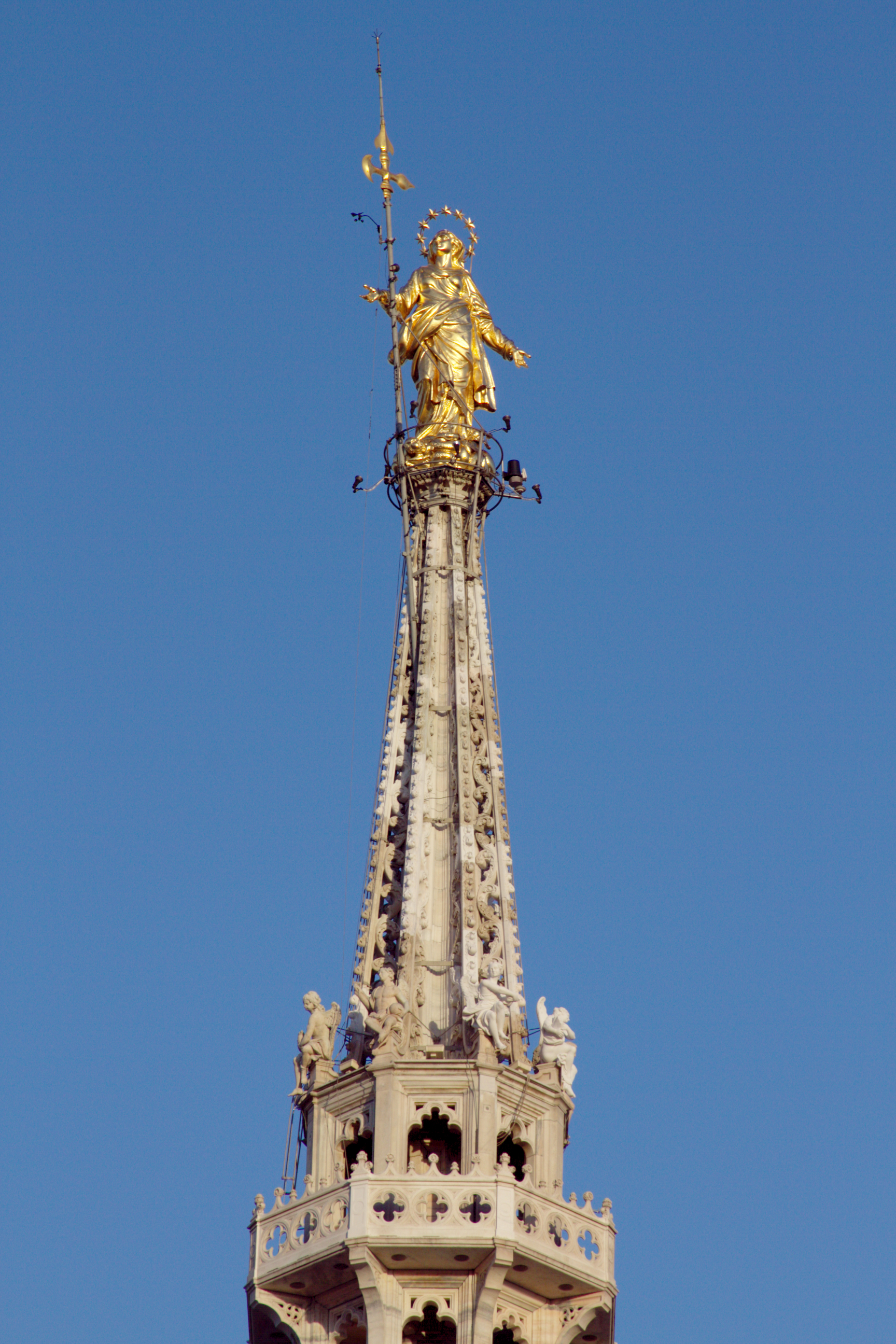
- The Madonnina atop Milan Cathedral

Song
- Language: Milanese dialect of Lombard
- English title: My beautiful Madonnina
- Written: 1934
- Songwriter: Giovanni d'Anzi

"O mia bella Madonnina" (Milanese: [ɔ ˈmiːa ˈbɛla maduˈnina]; meaning "Oh my beautiful little Madonna") is a song by Giovanni D'Anzi which is an unofficial city anthem of Milan. The title refers to the golden statue of the Virgin Mary on the spire of Milan Cathedral visible all over the city, namely the Madonnina.

The song was written and composed in 1934 by the Milan songwriter Giovanni D'Anzi (1906–1974). In the 1930s, many immigrants from the Mezzogiorno, especially from the region of Naples, came to Milan bringing with them their famous Neapolitan songs such as "'O sole mio". D'Anzi thus decided to create a musical answer from Milan. The song became a hit in the city almost immediately, and in 1938 it topped the Italian hit parade.

Musically, "Oh mia bella Madonnina" has similarities to American ballads of the time. The lyrics give some praise to Neapolitan music but add that Milan also deserves a mention; they address the Madonna under whose domination Milan is vibrant with life and always busy. The lyrics end with an offer to shake hands because it is a small world, after all, but the closing verse ma Milan, l'è on gran Milan! ("but Milan is a great Milan!") reaffirms the Milanese pride. It is often sung by AC Milan and Inter Milan fans during the matches, in particular during the Derby della Madonnina.

== Sources ==
- Giovanni D'Anzi, Le canzoni milanesi, Curci, Milano 1961
