= Gothic art in Milan =

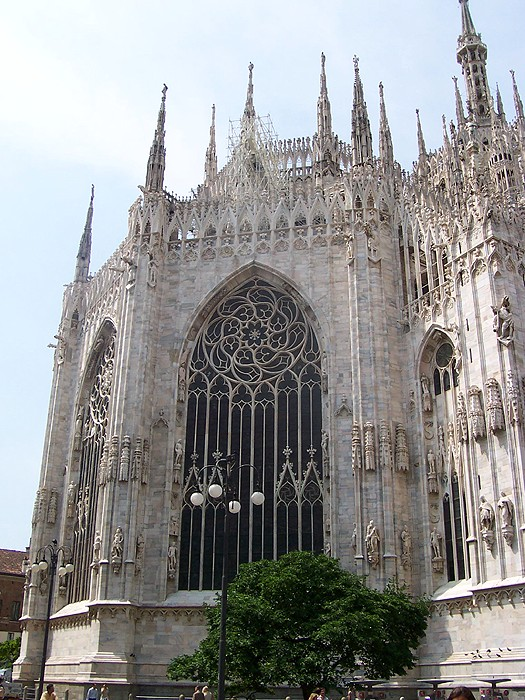
Apsidal view of the Milan Cathedral.

Gothic art in Milan denotes the city's artistic period at the turn of the second half of the 13th century and the first half of the 15th century. The Gothic style, initially introduced into Milanese territory by Cistercian monks, was the main artistic style of the vast patronage and self-celebrating agenda of the Visconti family, lords of Milan, whose rule over the city is usually associated with the Milanese Gothic period.

== Historical background ==
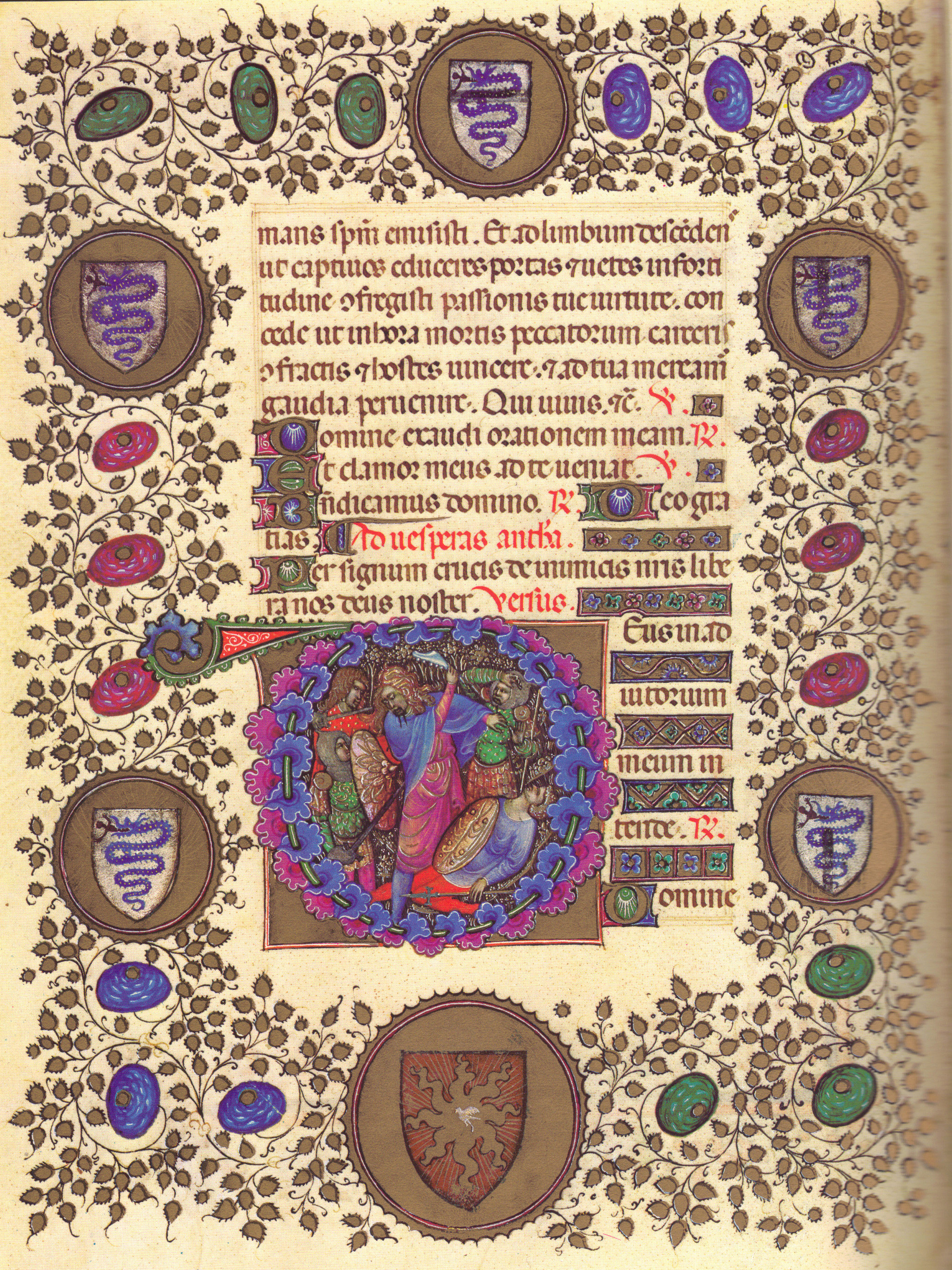
The Offiziolo of Gian Galeazzo Visconti with the symbols of the Visconti lineage.

As a conventional date of the beginning of the Gothic period in the territory of the seignory of Milan, the Visconti family's rise to power in 1282 is often given. Thus, the spread of the new artistic trends from beyond the Alps came later than in central Italy, where Cistercian Gothic had already produced almost a century earlier the Abbey of Fossanova (1187) and the Abbey of Casamari (1203). This delay in the introduction of the Gothic style in the Milanese area can be explained by the strong and deep-rooted presence of Romanesque architecture, also by virtue of the link between this architecture and the Empire, which was not for nothing overcome only with the new political course of the Visconti seigniory.

The date, however, is only approximate since the first example of Gothic art appeared in Milan by Cistercian monks in the first half of the 13th century: in 1221 the abbey of Chiaravalle was consecrated by Bishop Enrico Settala. At the same time, the Gothic style did not spread in an appreciable way in the territory, with stylistic features strongly influenced by Romanesque, until the work of Azzone Visconti between 1329 and 1339, who introduced artists from Pisa and Florence to his court.

The extensive program of support for the arts inaugurated by Azzone Visconti was continued by his successor Bernabò Visconti, but especially by Gian Galeazzo: under his lordship the largest Italian Gothic building site for the construction of the new city cathedral was inaugurated. For this work, which in the duke's mind would have been monumental and grandiose, architects and artists from all over Europe were called to Milan: the continuous confrontation between local and foreign workers helped to bring to maturity the Lombard Gothic style, which before then had been anchored to the strong Romanesque heritage, creating a synthesis between Italian and European Gothic architecture.

After a setback due to a turbulent political period after the death of Gian Galeazzo Visconti, Milan's artistic splendor resumed vigor under Filippo Maria Visconti, who in the first half of the 15th century transformed the Milanese court into one of the major centers of Italian humanism, calling to his service personalities such as Francesco Filelfo, Pier Candido Decembrio, Gasparino Barzizza and Antonio da Rho. In the last years of the Visconti seigniory, similarly to what happened in Florence, there were the first hints of the new Renaissance art with the work of Masolino da Panicale in Castiglione Olona.

The conclusion of the Gothic period is thus indicatively made to coincide with the collapse of the Visconti seigniory in 1447, with a late Gothic style that would be grafted onto the early central Italian Renaissance developments giving rise to the Lombard Renaissance.

== Religious architecture ==
=== The introduction of Gothic art: the abbeys ===
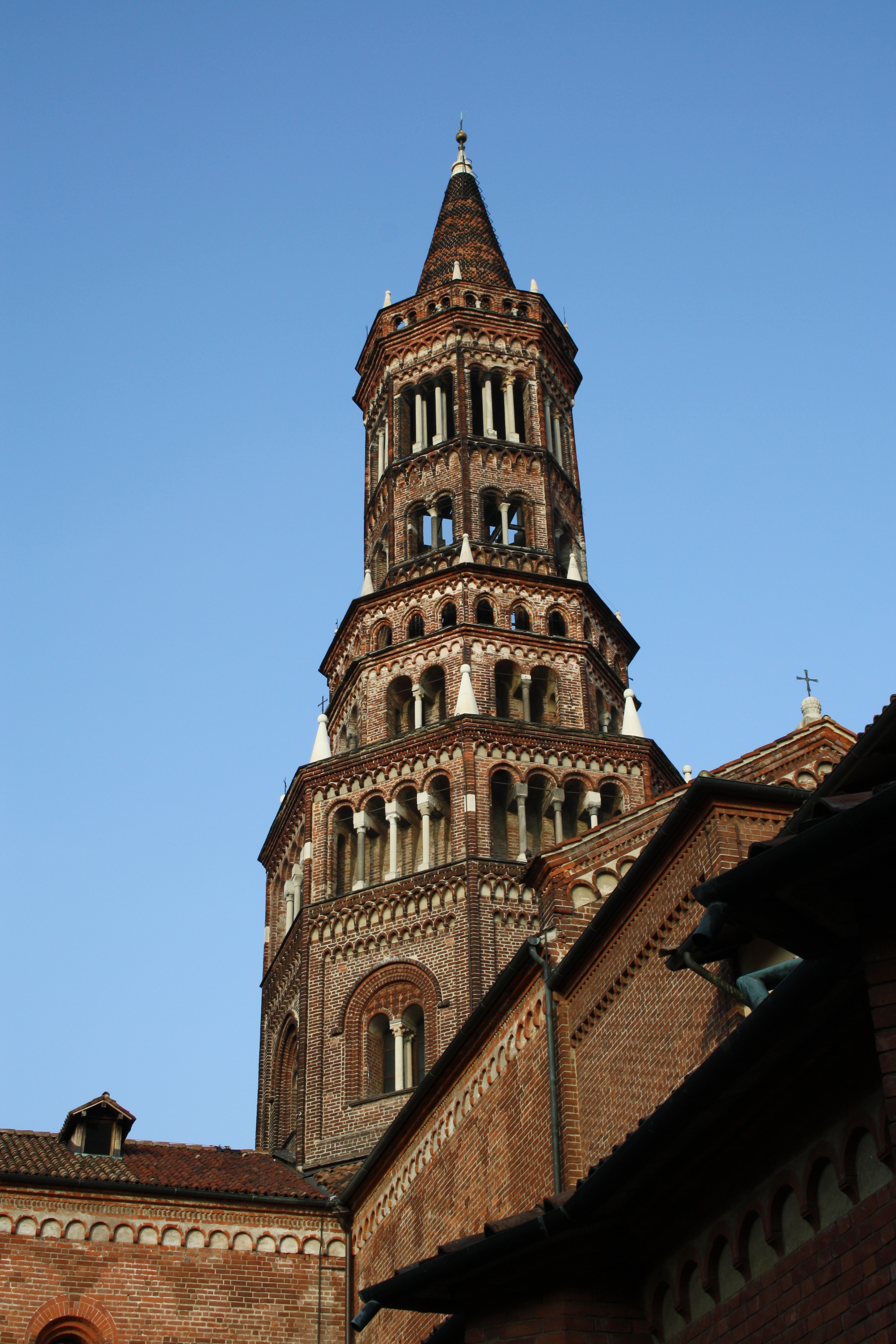
Lantern tower of Chiaravalle Abbey.

In Milan, as in other places, the Gothic style was introduced by Cistercian monks from France: the earliest example of Gothic art in Milan is the Abbey of Chiaravalle, built from the first half of the 13th century by monks from the Abbey of Clairvaux. The description must take into account the particular complexity of its history, which sees interventions on the church from its foundation until the 18th century: for example, of the Gothic façade only the upper order in terracotta remains, decorated with an oculus and a bifora enclosed in the profile of the gabled roof decorated with Lombard bands.

The church, built respecting the architectural indications for Cistercian churches provided by St. Bernard, can be defined by its structure and part of the decoration as a compromise between thirteenth-century Lombard architecture and Cistercian Gothic, that is, the first building to break with the Romanesque tradition and to introduce, albeit with forms much mitigated by the Lombard tradition, the forms of Gothic style.

The first interventions to bridge the transition between Romanesque and Gothic were the work on the southern cloister of the church, with pointed brick arches supported by twin stone columns. However, the most notable and most distinctive Gothic architectural intervention in the abbey was the construction of the lantern tower: the tower is octagonal in shape and rests on the square-plan presbytery to which it is connected through the use of pendentives with descending arches. The octagonal tower consists of three vertical orders that narrow as it proceeds upward: the tower is decorated with alternating biforas, monoforas and quadriforas in which terracotta and white marble decorations alternate to create a contrast of colors.

Inside, the most interesting pictorial decorations include fragments of fourteenth-century frescoes of the Evangelists in the space of the dome and the sixteen figures of Saints, by an author identified as the First Master of Chiaravalle. In the lower part of the dome, on the other hand, are the Stories of the Virgin, a refined and elegant composition of Giottesque style attributed to Stefano Fiorentino and based on the Golden Legend by Jacobus de Voragine.

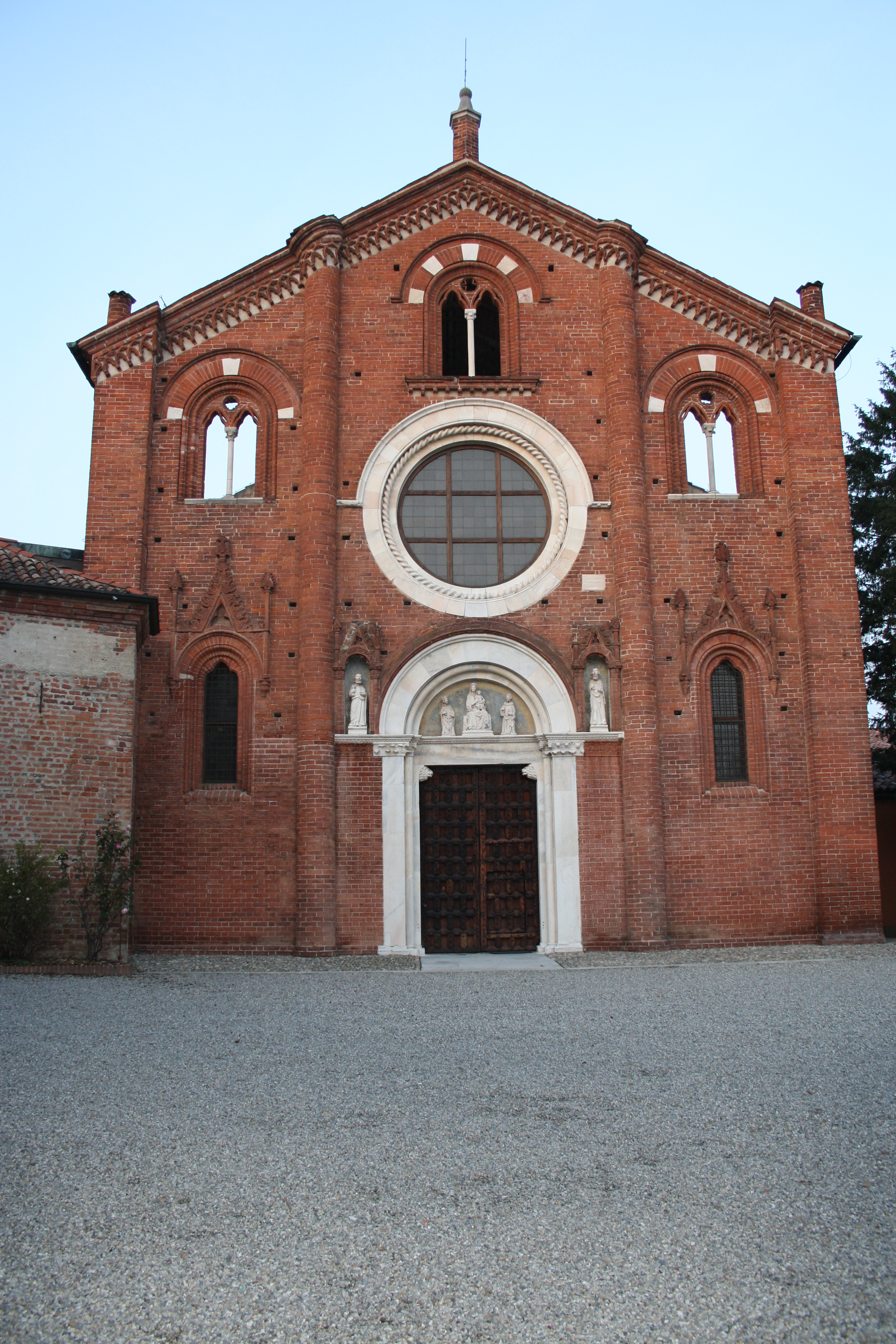
Façade of Viboldone Abbey.

Founded in 1176, much of Viboldone Abbey was built between the late 13th and 14th centuries. The brick facade, completed in 1348, has a gabled structure bordered by hanging arches and is divided vertically into three partitions defined by buttresses. The portal has a rich marble decoration with sculptures of the Madonna and Child among Saints of the Campionese school and is sided by two hanging aedicules and two narrow monoforas with cusped frames in terracotta; the decoration of the upper order consists of a circular window and three biforas, of which the two side ones are purely decorative as they do not lead onto the lower aisles. The interior is divided into three rib-vaulted naves.

Subsequent to the mid-1400s is the interior pictorial decoration: the oldest work is the fresco of the Madonna and Child with Saints in the apse by an anonymous Lombard master with Tuscan influences. Also on the apse walls is the Last Judgment by Giusto dei Menabuoi in which the scheme of Giotto's Last Judgment at the Scrovegni Chapel is taken up. Finally, mention can be made of the Stories from the Life of Christ by an anonymous Lombard painter in which Lombard naturalistic accuracy is influenced by Giusto dei Menabuoi's use of chiaroscuro, and the Madonna Enthroned among Saints by Michelino da Besozzo.

Although outside the municipal territory, undoubtedly related to the city is the abbey of Morimondo, which, as with the abbeys just mentioned, came into being in the first half of the 12th century due to the arrival of Cistercian monks from France. Also in this case one is confronted, in the original remaining parts of the church, with a very primitive Gothic style, discernible, for example, in the slender proportions when compared with those of Romanesque art. The facade is in exposed terracotta with biforas and a rose window, made in a very simple manner as dictated by the rules of Cistercian architecture.

The Mirasole Abbey complex, among the few Lombard examples of fortified religious architecture, was founded in the 13th century, while the church dates from the late 14th century. The façade is in terracotta with very simple decorations, consisting of a rose window, two monoforas, and a lowered-arch terracotta portal; the interior has a single-nave hall ending in a quadrangular apse where the Assumption of the Virgin is frescoed by an anonymous painter probably related to the style of Michelino da Besozzo.

=== The Visconti period ===
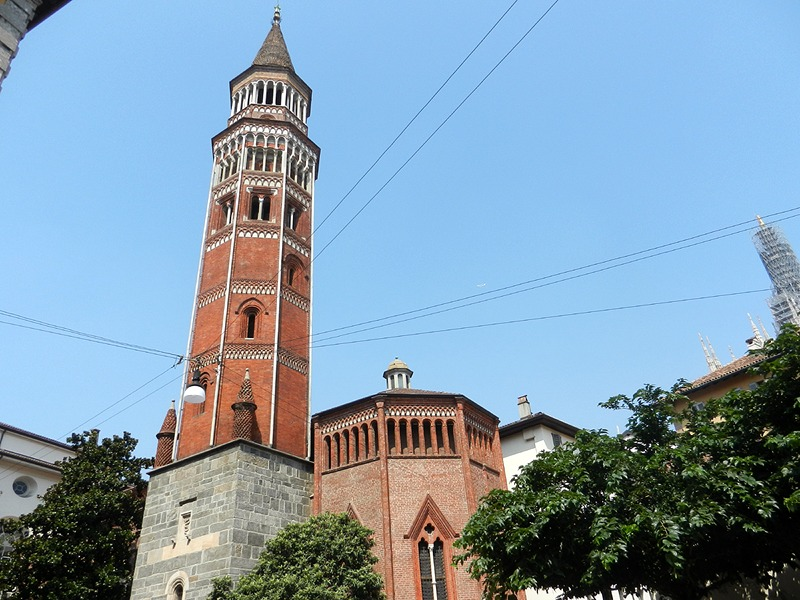
Apse and bell tower of San Gottardo.

In the early 14th century Lord Azzone Visconti inaugurated a full-fledged program of patronage that had its centerpiece in Gothic architecture. Among the earliest achievements is the church of San Gottardo in Corte, built as a ducal chapel dedicated to the patron saint of the gout that would affect Azzone, though greatly remodeled in appearance in the 18th century. Of the original exterior appearance, the octagonal bell tower and the semi-octagonal apse are preserved: the decoration is made by alternating terracotta elements, already typical of Lombard Romanesque architecture, and white marble elements. The outstanding element of the complex is the octagonal bell tower attributed to Francesco Pegorari from Cremona: the use of terracotta is prevalent in the lower levels of the bell tower to leave room for white marble in the higher parts up to the crowning, probably taken from the lantern tower of Chiaravalle Abbey and at the top of the Torrazzo of Cremona.

The interior, according to Galvano Fiamma's chronicles of the time, was completely frescoed by Giotto, called to Milan by Azzone Visconti, and his school: of the cycle of paintings only the Crucifixion remains nowadays, attributed by some directly to the Tuscan master, while according to another hypothesis some features of the painting, such as realism and attention to detail, would suggest an anonymous, though extraordinary, master of the Giotto sphere with Lombard influences.

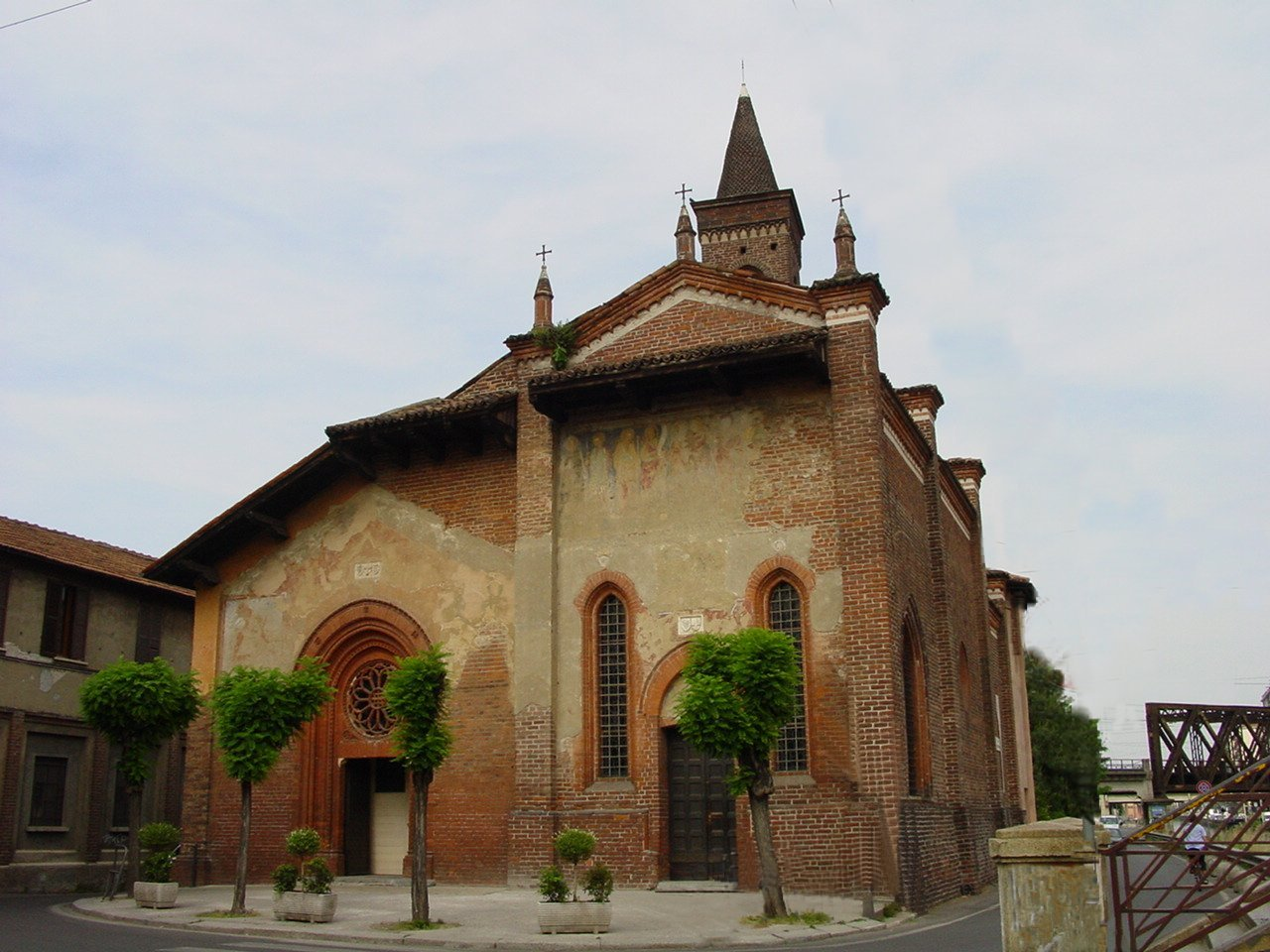
Facade of San Cristoforo.

The church of San Cristoforo sul Naviglio is composed of the union of two buildings dating from the late 12th century and the late 14th century, respectively. The façade, which is also divided in two, has on the left a pointed arch portal in terracotta with a rose window inscribed in the arch, according to some interpretations in a Lombard style of the side portal of the church of Santa Maria della Spina in Pisa, while on the right there is another pointed arch portal that is less decorated but of more slender proportions and sided by two windows with pointed arches. On both sides of the facade are remnants of frescoes. Inside, the right side of the church has a rectangular-shaped hall with a wooden roof and semicircular apse, while the left side has a cross-ribbed roof with monoforas on the wall that provide lighting. Fragments of frescoes visible in the church include the Crucifixion of the Zavattari.

To the second half of the 12th century dates the church of San Lorenzo in Monluè, built by the Humiliati order in a very simple style probably borrowed from Cistercian architecture. The façade is very slender in exposed terracotta, and the portal has a round arch surmounted by a mock prothyrum sided by two narrow monoforas. The church bell tower, with a square plan, consists of four horizontal orders: the top floor is decorated with biforas with arches resting on stone columns. The simple interior has a single nave and originally had a wooden truss roof: on the walls are remnants of frescoes on the theme of plant elements, typical of Lombard pictorial decoration in the early 14th century.

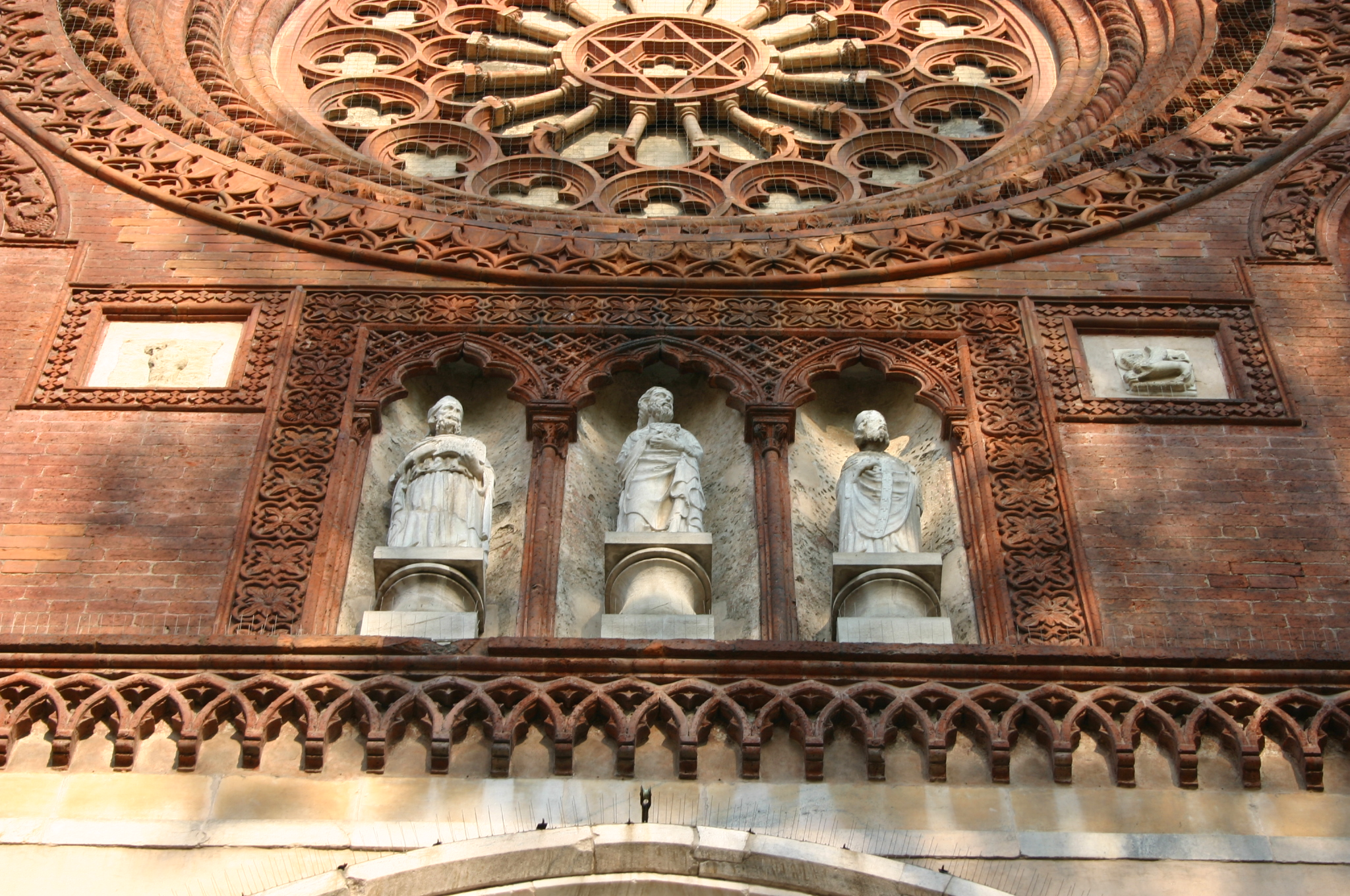
Detail of the facade of San Marco.

The church of St. Mark was founded in the late 12th century by Augustinian monks; however, heavy interventions undergone by the church since the 16th century have largely distorted its appearance, which was minimally recovered in the exterior with the 19th-century restorations by Carlo Maciachini. Of the original structure, the broken-line structure marked vertically by buttresses can be seen today: also original are the terracotta rose window and the white marble portal surmounted by three statues of Saints Augustine, Mark and Ambrose. To the early 14th century dates the quadrangular masonry bell tower, which takes up one of the typical architectural models of the Milan area of the time already used, for example, in the abbey of Mirasole and the Arengario of Monza.

Of the original pictorial decoration, a few fragments of a fresco in the left apse chapel dedicated to the Virgin Mary remain visible, namely the Madonna and Child Enthroned and Saints dating from the late 13th century, from the style influenced by Byzantine art but also by the frescoes of the construction site of the basilica of St. Francis of Assisi and the later fresco of Magdalene and a knight saint, whose stylistic similarities with the construction site of the Chiaravalle Abbey lead to attributing the work to the so-called First Master of Chiaravalle. Finally, inside the church are many important sculptural works dating from the Gothic period, including the Funeral Monument to Lanfranco Settala, and the Arche Aliprandi.

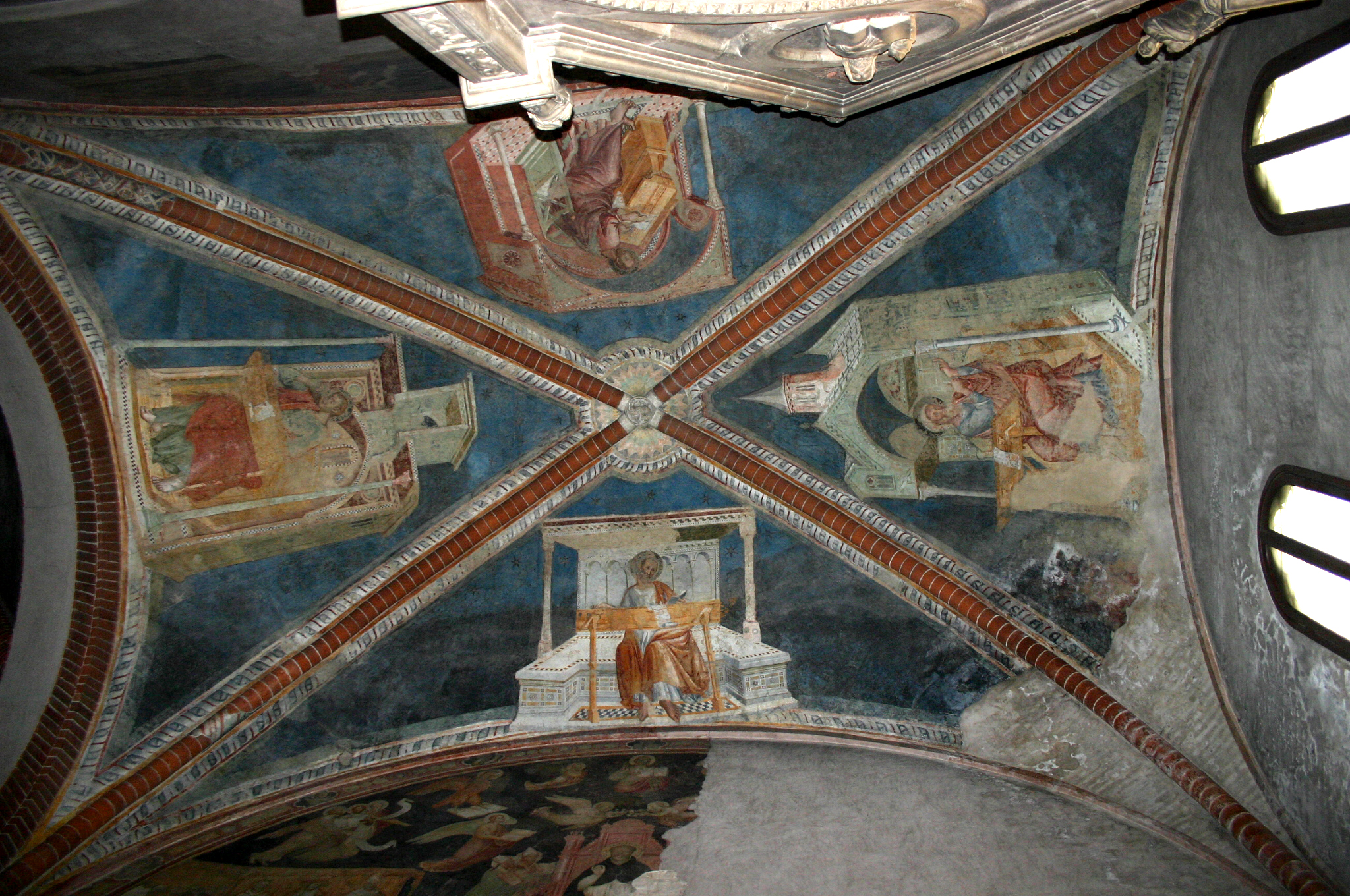
Frescoes of the Visconti Chapel in Sant'Eustorgio.

Although founded at the end of the 14th century, the church of Santa Maria del Carmine has no significant elements of Gothic architecture with the exception of the plan: the facade is in fact the result of a 19th-century neo-Gothic restoration while the interior was decorated mainly between the 15th and 17th centuries. The floor plan has a Latin cross with three naves, a form taken from the Certosa di Pavia by the same architect Bernardo da Venezia. From reading the plan, the construction of the building rule "ad quadratum," which uses a square as the basic element for defining proportions, is evident: the main nave is composed of three squares, as is the transept, while the aisles and side chapels have the area of a quarter of the elementary square.

In the basilica of Sant'Eustorgio is the Visconti chapel that was started in 1297 by Matteo Visconti. Of the original pictorial decoration, only the figures of the four Evangelists remain in good condition, while there are traces of later frescoes such as the Triumph of St. Thomas, St. George Freeing the Princess and seven Saints, attributed to the so-called Master of Lentate, author of the cycle of frescoes in the Oratory of Santo Stefano in Lentate. Finally, the chapel contains the Ark of Matteo and Valentina Visconti. Also in Sant'Eustorgio, late Gothic frescoes dating from 1440 of Evangelists and Saints attributed to the Zavattari circle can be found in the Torriani chapel.

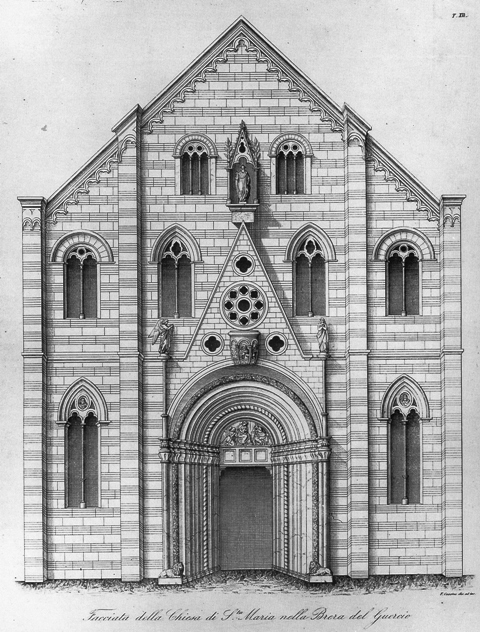
Façade of Santa Maria di Brera.

The Visconti chapel was, however, left aside by Barnabò Visconti, who moved the family chapel to the now-demolished church of San Giovanni in Conca: the exterior architecture and interior layout were taken from the architecture of the abbeys of the time, as evidenced by the facade moved before demolition with a rose window and monoforas on the model of the Viboldone abbey. Among the remains of pictorial decoration taken before the demolition of the church are the Announcing Angel and the Virgin Annunciate by an anonymous early 14th-century painter with Venetian influences. By contrast, of more markedly Tuscan influence are the Stories of St. John the Evangelist, kept in the collections of the Sforza Castle, in which use is made of bright colors with hints of perspective construction; attributed to an anonymous master of the circle of Giusto dei Menabuoi.

In the basilica of San Calimero is Leonardo da Besozzo's fresco of the Madonna and Child, a painting executed in the late Gothic fifteenth century by the forms of the characters inspired by the frescoes of the Borromeo Games in the Borromeo Palace and his own work in the church of San Giovanni a Carbonara in Naples. Leonardo, son of Michelino da Besozzo, collaborated with his father in the creation of the Madonna dell'Idea preserved in the cathedral in Milan.

Of the many churches built in the Gothic style between the 12th and 15th centuries, only a few examples survive today, while most were either completely transformed between the 16th and 17th centuries during the work of the Borromeo cardinals or demolished with the Josephine suppressions in the 18th century. Among the demolitions carried out in the latter period was the church of Santa Maria in Brera: the façade was designed by Giovanni di Balduccio and contemplated a gabled front built with black and white marble forming bands of alternating colors, while the internal division into three naves was emphasized on the outside with buttresses. The portal featured a round arch with splay crowned by a spire containing a small rose window; the decoration was then completed by biforas and triforas and various groups of statues including the wimperg group. Only a few traces of the interior remain in the Brera Art Gallery, including some side bays of the church in which frescoes of Saints and Prophets attributed to Giusto dei Menabuoi are visible. The church had a three-aisle interior divided by columns with zoomorphic capitals typical of late 13th-century Lombard sculpture.

Finally, another famous Gothic church that no longer exists is the church of Santa Maria alla Scala: the building had a gabled facade composed of three vertical partitions marked by four buttresses ending in pinnacles. As typical of Lombard Gothic architecture, the facade was decorated with alternating terracotta and marble elements to create a chromatic contrast, such as the white marble rose window or the monoforas and biforas in terracotta and marble. The church also featured a polygonal bell tower similar to that of the church of San Gottardo in Corte.

=== The Cathedral ===
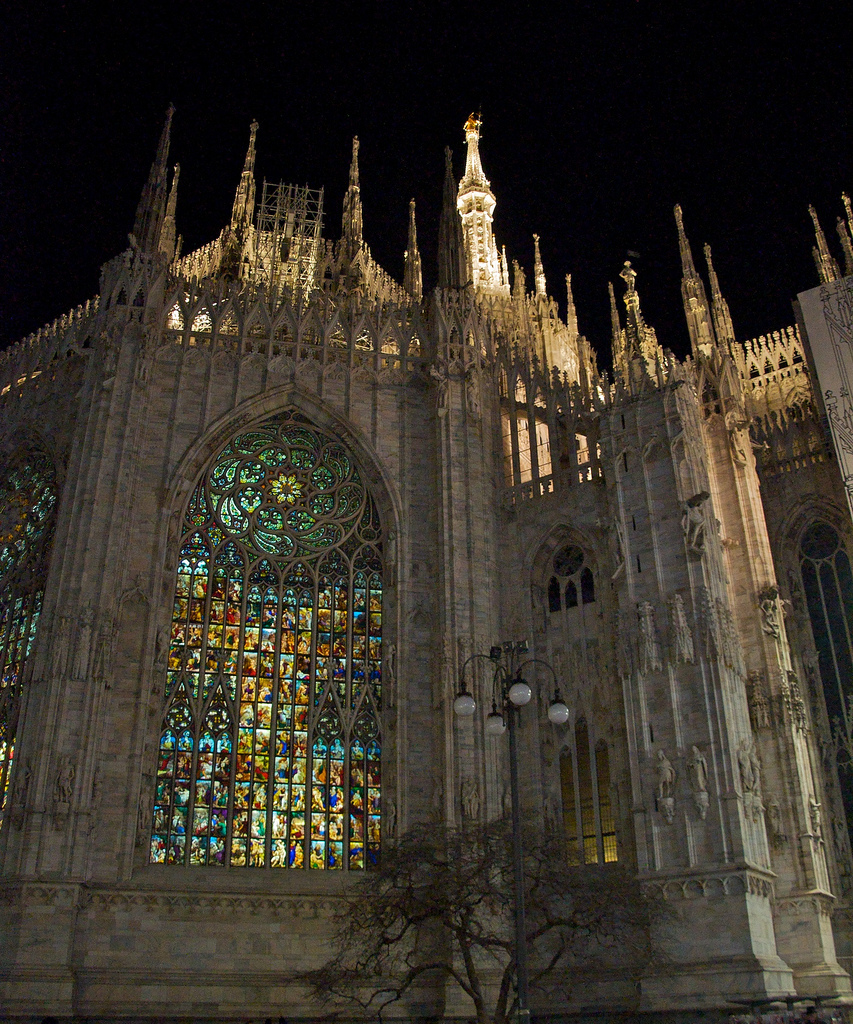
Apsidal view of the cathedral with illuminated stained glass windows.

The vicissitudes of the Milan Cathedral, an International Gothic masterpiece, were complex from the time the Fabbrica was founded in 1386 and would continue for many centuries to come: original to the Gothic period are only the apse, the sacristies and part of the transept, with the rest of the church executed later in a manner more or less adherent to the original design. A very strong push in a patronage direction toward the construction of a grandiose building came from Gian Galeazzo Visconti, recently crowned duke by the emperor, who financed part of the work and worked to raise other funds from the population and called in architects from all over Europe, especially from France, Germany and Flanders.

The initial design, which is now lost, was probably by an Alsatian architect, but after a few years the architect was replaced to give way to a period of continuous changes in architects and designs: within a few years the French Nicolas de Bonaventure, the Italians Antonio di Vincenzo and Gabriele Stornaloco, and the Germans Giovanni da Fernach and Heinrich Parler, among others, were called to the cathedral's construction site. Among the main reasons for the various disagreements was the choice of proportions for the façade, which would be inscribed in a square ("ad quadratum" construction) or in a triangle ("ad triangolum" construction).

The disputes can be summarized with the Italians in favor of the "ad triangolum" construction, which would eventually prevail leading to the construction of a lower church with more squat proportions, and the German and French master builders in favor of an "ad quadratum" construction that would allow for a taller and more slender façade. A similar debate arose again with the Parisian architect Giovanni da Mignot, who was also ousted after a short time, over the proportions and statics of the vaults: these debates, which went far beyond the normal parochialist hang-ups, were mainly related to the resistance of the Italian tradition still linked to Romanesque architecture and the consequent delay with which the Milanese territory incorporated the novelties of European Gothic architecture.

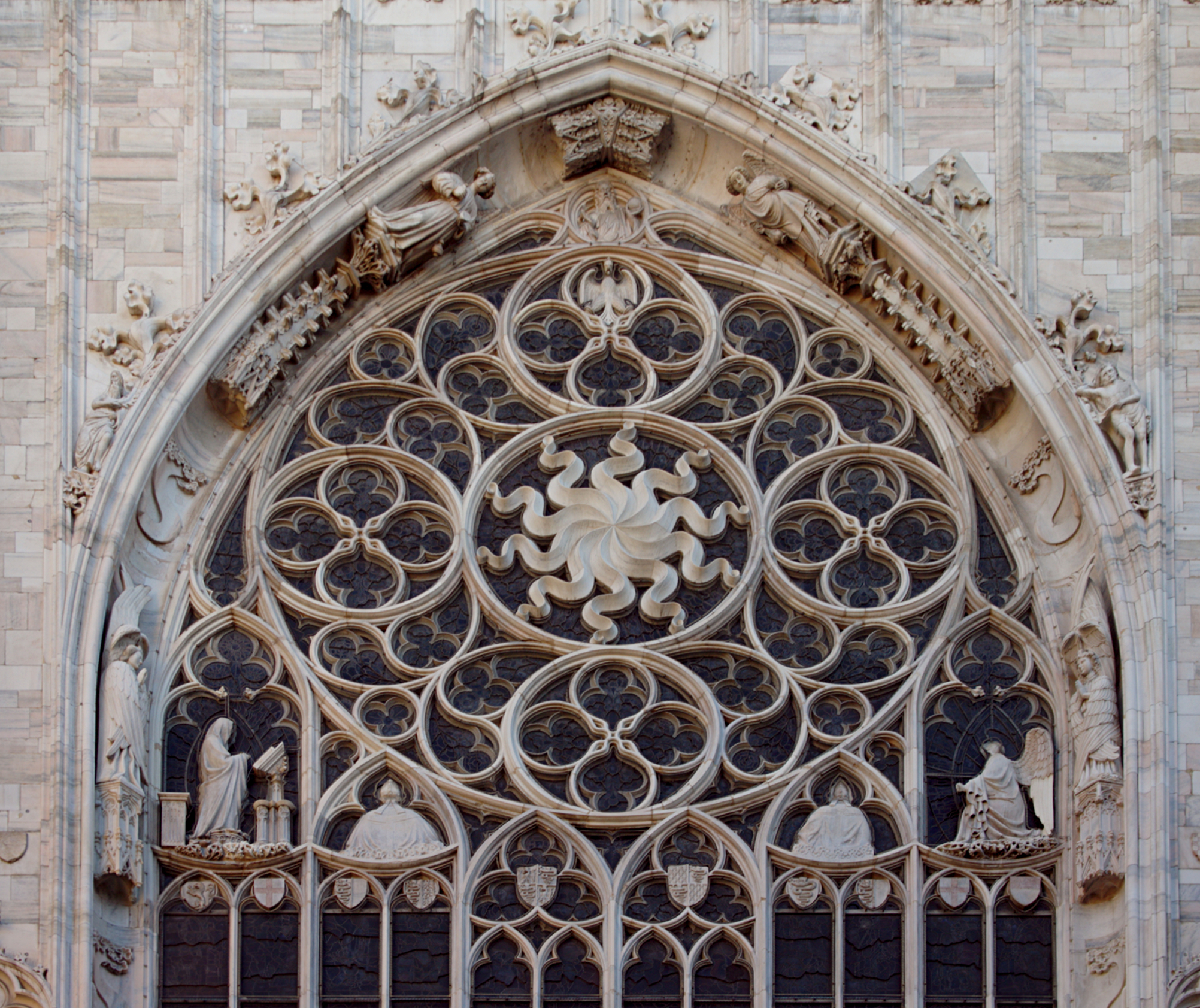
Detail of the apsidal window.

The first element of detachment of the cathedral from the earlier Milanese churches was the perimeter structure, which unlike the other churches, which provided for an eventual covering of the brick structure with more noble materials, is composed exclusively of blocks of Candoglia marble: the supporting structure presents the flying buttress system typical of Gothic architecture, with the outer perimeter walls decorated with an enormous number of statues and corbels. The external statuary decoration is presented, relative to Gothic-era commissions, as a sampler of European sculpture with works carried out by local, Burgundian, Bohemian, German, and French craftsmen: in particular, the ninety-six Giants that adorn the structure's gargoyles can be attributed to the last two groups. Among the main Lombard artists to handle the dense array of exterior statues are Jacopino da Tradate and Matteo Raverti.

Two of the exemplary works by the two main Italian sculptors active on the site are Jacopino da Tradate's St. Bartholomew the Apostle and Raverti's Saint Bishop: in the former case there is extensive use of drapery and there is particular attention to detail, for example in the rendering of the beard, without, however, giving excessive expressiveness to the face, which is the case in Raverti's statue, which restores a suffering saint with hollowed-out cheeks, the result of careful study and modeling.

The apse is, for the aforementioned temporal reasons, the part most adherent to the stylistic features of the International Gothic: the three pointed-arched windows are deeply decorated with the central theme of the Raza Viscontea, or the radiant sun, symbol of the family, designed by Michelino da Besozzo: the stained-glass windows are decorated with the cycle featuring Stories from the Old Testament in the northern stained-glass window, the Apocalypse in the central stained-glass window, and Episodes from the New Testament in the southern stained-glass window, the work of Stefano da Pandino and Franceschino Zavattari. More generally, starting from the early fifteenth century the cathedral can be considered as one of the major European laboratories of the art of stained-glass windows, in which the major Lombard painters of the various periods would participate until its conclusion.

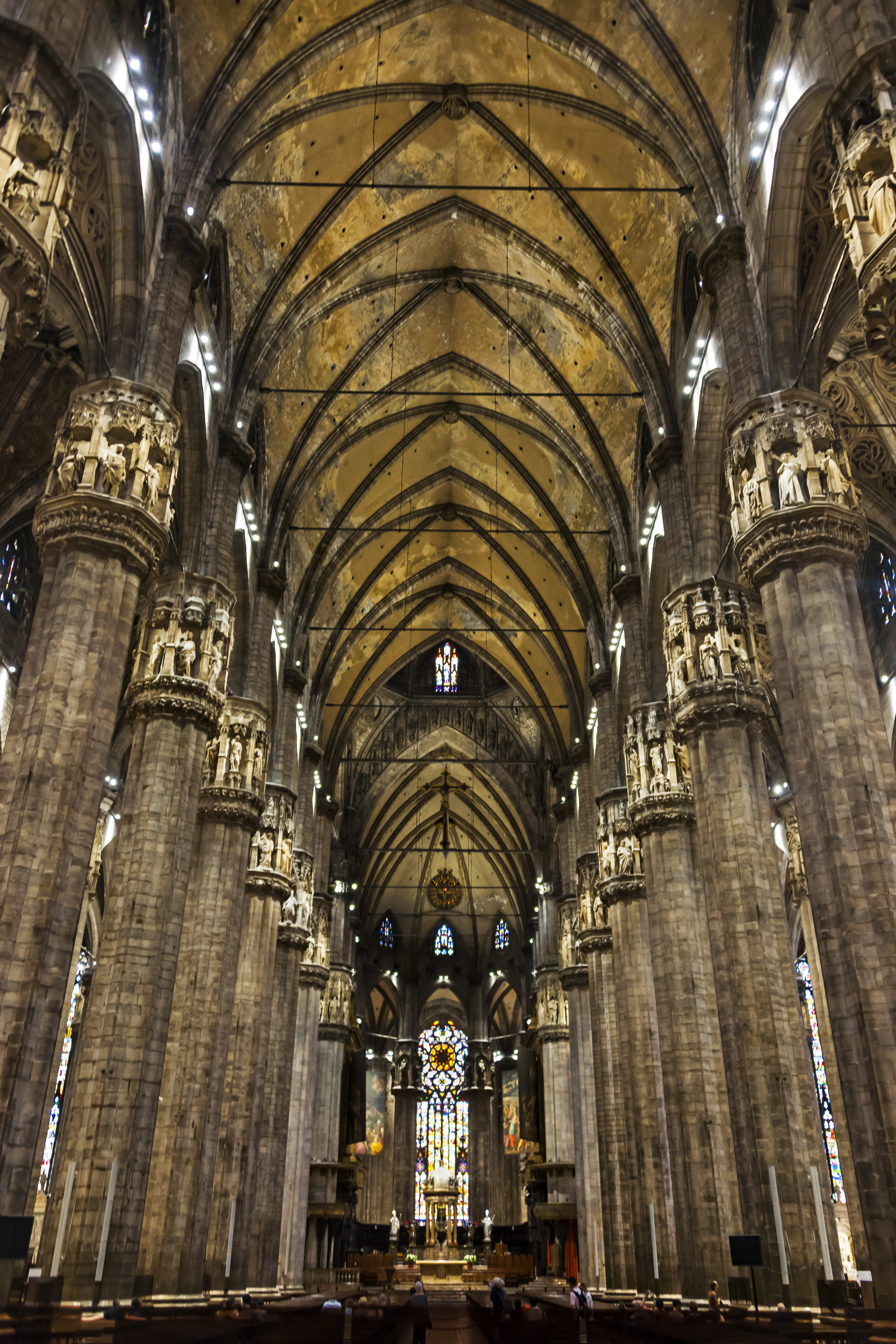
Main nave of the cathedral.

The interior has a Latin cross plan with the hall divided into five naves, with a slightly projecting transept divided into three naves and a semi-octagonal apse. The rib vaults are supported by polystyle pillars with capitals decorated with saints placed in niches by Giovannino de' Grassi.

The portal of the southern sacristy, carved from 1392 by Giovanni da Fernach with decorations of the Stories of the Virgin, is a perfect example of German International Gothic. Above a sober architrave made by Giovannino de' Grassi decorated with four-lobed panels with Heads of Prophets, there is the most exuberant decoration, on the theme of Stories of the Virgin, inserted in an ogival arch sided by two pinnacles and ending at the top with a Crucifixion. Finally, the extrados of the lunette features the traditional Gothic decoration of large curled leaves. Among the original decorations, inside the sacristy is the washbasin with a cusped dossal, also by Giovannino de Grassi. A similar decoration can be found in the entrance of the northern sacristy, beyond which one finds oneself in the only room of the cathedral where one can admire the original flooring of the church, dating back to the early 15th century, made by Marco Solari, along with remains of contemporary terracotta decorations.

As a whole, therefore, the cathedral turned out to be the point of detachment from the last links with Romanesque architecture in the Milanese territory, yet the church, despite the influences that Italian architecture had on its construction, remained unique not only in the territory of the duchy but also in all of Italy:

The church as it was built remains foreign to the Italian architectural tradition [...] Just as St. Mark's in Venice is Byzantine-based, so the cathedral in Milan is French or German, but not Italian. Only by the fact that it is built in Milan and also adorned by Italian sculptors can it be said to be an Italian church: this does not detract, of course, from the fact that it is a distinguished monument and that the sense of mystery communicated by its stained-glass penumbra is absolutely unique on Italian soil

— Cesare Brandi

== Civil and military architecture ==
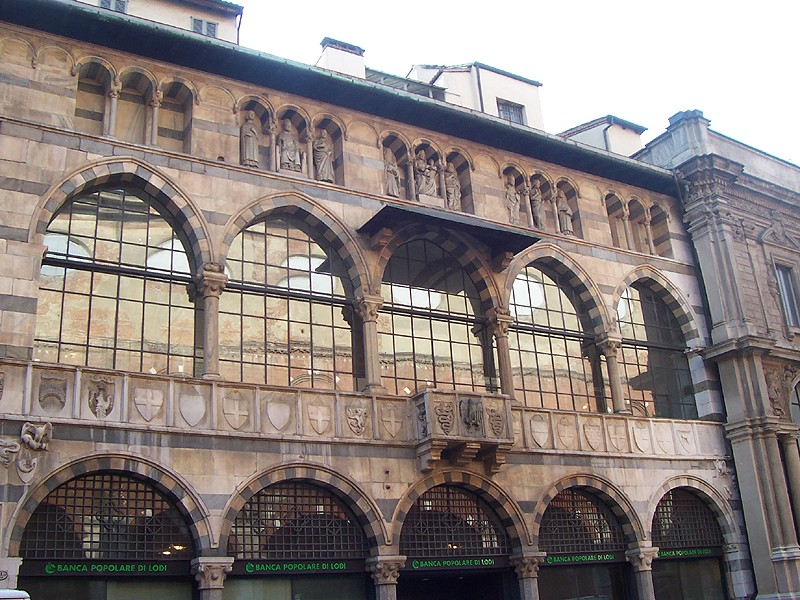
Loggia degli Osii.

Among the first interventions that established the spread of Gothic in Milan were Matteo and Azzone Visconti's work in the Broletto Nuovo, today's Piazza dei Mercanti, which had long been the seat of civic power.

The first building to be rebuilt was the Loggia degli Osii in 1316: the façade is made of black and white marble, a choice that broke with the traditional use of exposed terracotta though already used in the church of Santa Maria in Brera, and is set on two horizontal orders originally porticoed. The ground floor has round arches supported by octagonal stone columns, and this configuration is repeated on the upper floor with the use of arches of equal width but with pointed arches, while there is a parapet decorated with Visconti coats of arms. Finally, the building is crowned by a high cornice where there are barrel-vaulted niches containing all-round statues: subjects include Madonnas with Child, and various saints, including St. Ambrose and St. James.

Starting in 1433, Casa dei Panigarola was built, greatly remodeled over the years, of whose original structure remain the pointed arches with terracotta edging on the ground floor, supported by columns with capitals decorated with leaf motifs, while on the upper floor there is a terracotta window that is not original but echoes the original design with decoration typical of early 15th-century Lombard architecture.

Another intervention in the square, now completely lost as it has been replaced by the palace of the Scuole Palatine, was the portico of the Banchieri, built starting in 1336 with a porticoed structure similar to that of the Loggia degli Osii.

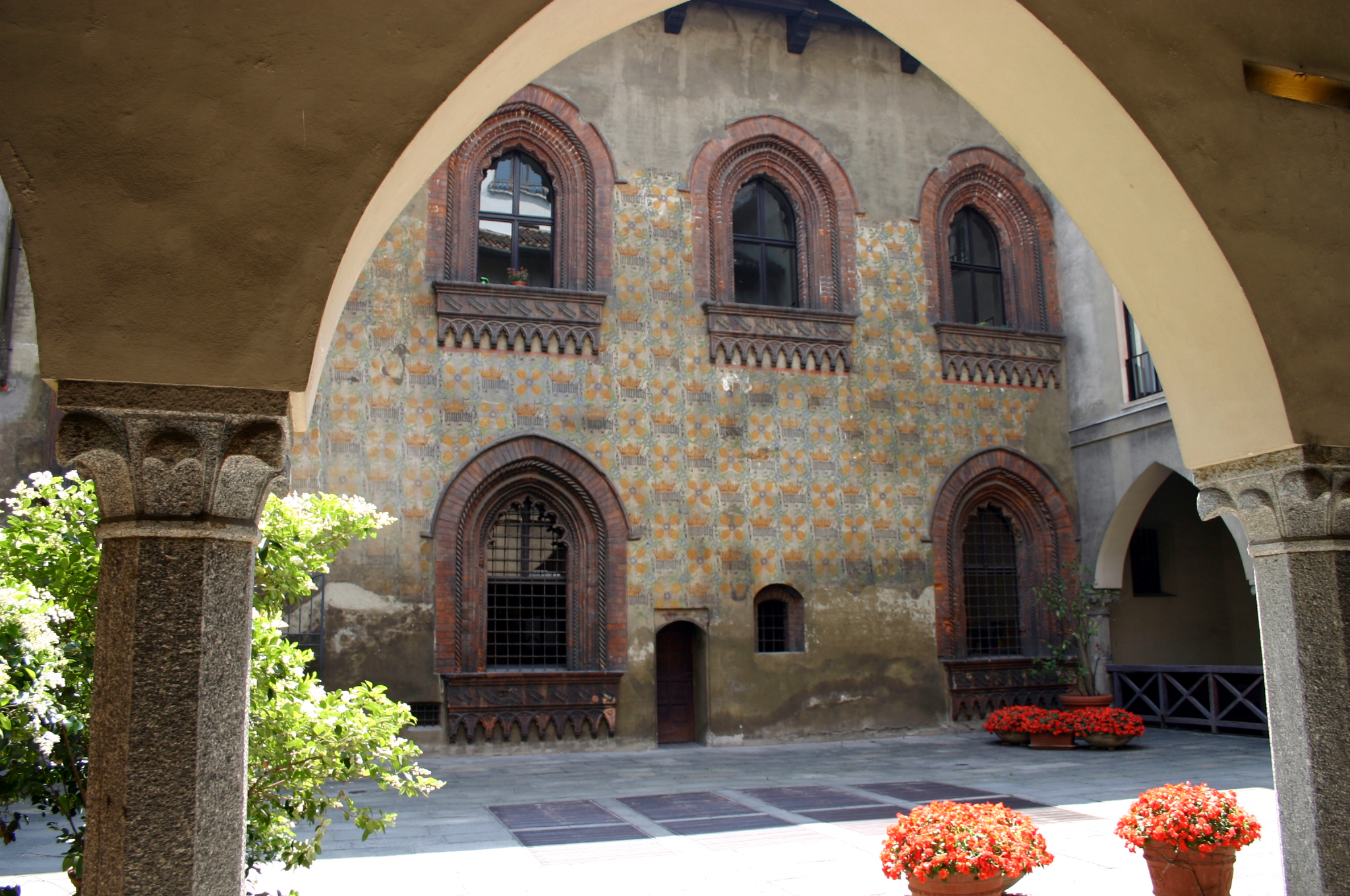
Courtyard of honor of Borromeo Palace.

Among the few private Gothic palaces preserved in the city is the Borromeo Palace built from the late 15th century. Of the original structure is part of the exposed brick facade with a pointed arch portal decorated with Candoglia marble ashlar and red Verona marble enclosed by a creased frieze. The courtyard of honor is porticoed on three sides with ogival arches supported by octagonal columns with capitals decorated with leaves. On the non-porticoed side there are six monoforas in terracotta with pointed arches, while on the walls there are traces of frescoes with heraldic motifs of the palace patrons. Inside are traces of late Gothic frescoes of the Borromeo Games, attributed by some to Pisanello. Once present in the palace and later removed are several fragments of frescoes, including the Harvest of Pomegranates attributed to Michelino da Besozzo, now preserved at the fortress of Angera. An equally valid alternative hypothesis, however, attributes the creation of the Borromeo Games complex to an author called Master of the Borromeo Games: this attribution differing from Pisanello or Michelino was made following the analysis of a rediscovered St. John in Sorrow, a fragment of the frescoes in the Borromeo Palace with stylistic references to Masolino's Christ in Pity while showing influences from the Lombard school.

Of the numerous towers of the time, which were built along with the noble palaces, only the Gorani tower and the Morigi tower have survived to the present day.

From the historical descriptions of the Royal Palace, at that time Broletto Nuovo and later Ducal Palace, the work of Giotto, who was called to court by Azzone Visconti, can be mentioned. Among the various works described by chroniclers of the time is the fresco of Illustrious Men with a mythological theme, modeled after his own work in the Hall of the Barons at the Maschio Angioino in Naples, decorated with gold and enamels typical of French Gothic painting:

Suntque hec figure ex auro azuro et smaltis distinte in tanta pulcritudine et tam subtili artificio sicut in toto orbe terrarum non contingeret reperirit
These gold and blue enamel figures are distinguished by such beauty and such artistic perfection that they cannot be found anywhere else in the world

—Galvano Fiamma

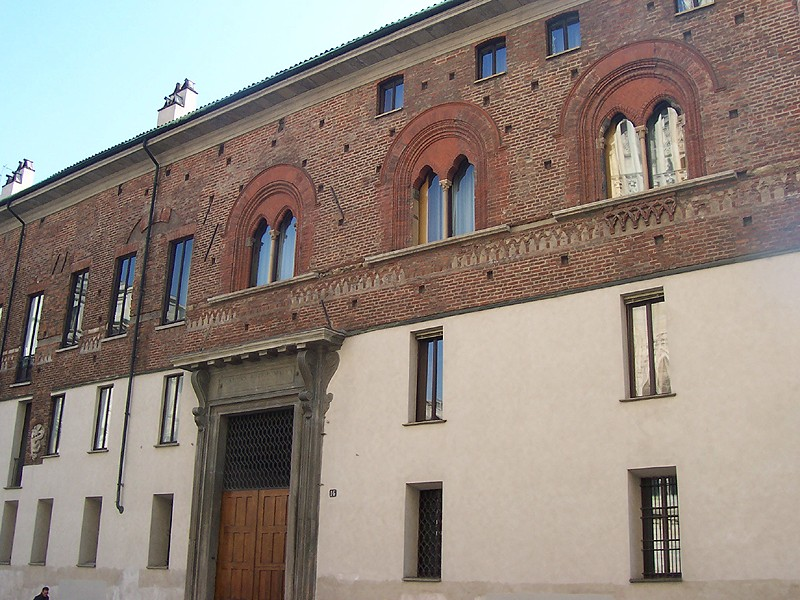
Remains of the original decoration of the Archbishop's Palace.

Finally, among the examples of civil architecture, albeit for the use of religious power, mention must be made of the Archbishop's Palace. As with the neighboring palace, remodeling over the various eras has almost completely obliterated the original construction commissioned by Ottone Visconti and Giovanni Visconti, archbishops of Milan: among the few Gothic remains are a few terracotta biforas on the facade toward the cathedral and on the west side. During some post-World War II restoration of the palace, fragments of frescoes of the Giotto school emerged. Also preserved in the archbishopric are fragments of frescoes that survived by pure chance from the reconstructions of the church of Santa Maria Podone, rediscovered and removed in the 20th century, depicting a procession of the Magi, whose attribution to Michelino da Besozzo or his workshop has not been possible because of the fragmentary nature of the work, though with designs that can certainly be traced by model and outline to those of the Libretto degli Anacoreti by Michelino.

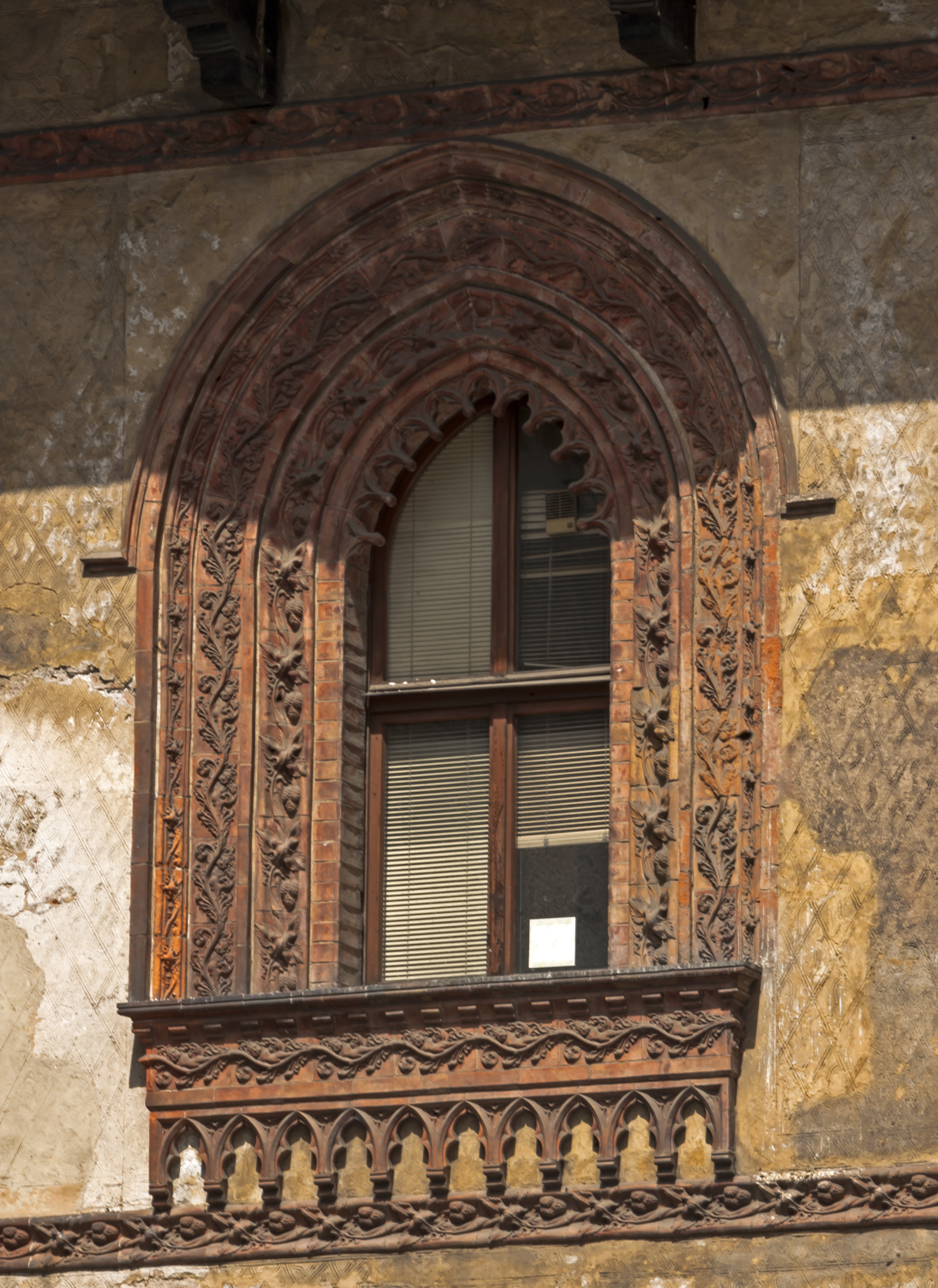
Window of the Casa dei Panigarola.

Among the many initiatives promoted by Azzone Visconti should also be mentioned the completion of work on the city's medieval walls along with the gates, which were designed to be veritable monuments. In each of the six gates of Milan, Azzone had a tabernacle dedicated to the Virgin Mary placed, usually alongside saints holding up the model of the city sestiere in relation to the gate: three of these were made by Giovanni di Balduccio, and the other three by the so-called Maestro della Lunetta di Viboldone, a sculptor among the most prominent of the circle of Campionese masters. To the former would be attributed the Virgin and Saints of Porta Ticinese and the statues taken from the demolished Porta Orientale and Porta Comasina, while to the latter would belong the tabernacles of Porta Nuova and the demolished Porta Romana and Porta Vercellina.

Along with the development of the city walls, the Visconti were responsible for the construction of the Porta Giovia castle, on whose remains the Sforza Castle would be built. The fortification was begun in 1368 by Galeazzo II Visconti, while Gian Galeazzo added to it an outer fortified citadel not connected to the central core, which was, however, connected, along with the construction of the Ghirlanda (a second outer fortification wall connected to the central core of the castle) by Filippo Maria Visconti starting in 1420. Of the ancient Visconti castle, which was attacked during the period of the Golden Ambrosian Republic and completely rebuilt by the Sforza dynasty, no trace remains other than the serizzo base of the Sforza castle.

== Sculpture ==
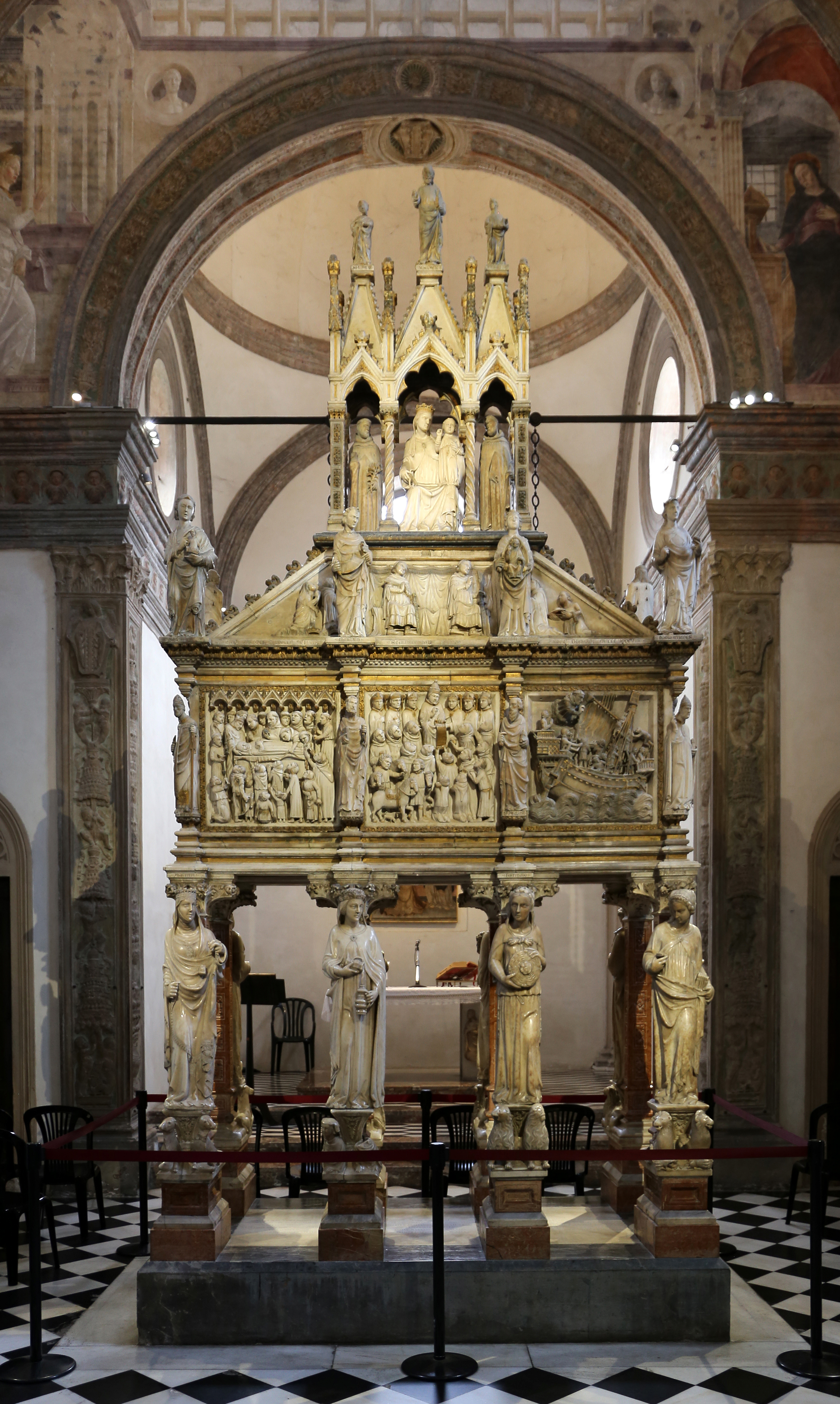
Ark of Saint Peter by Giovanni di Balduccio.

The transition from Romanesque to Gothic marked the abandonment of sculpture as an essence exclusively functional to architectural decoration in favor of autonomous works for which a separate analysis from the architectural context may be worthwhile. Milanese Gothic sculpture can thus be divided into two main strands, obviously never entirely separate and with mutual influences: on the one hand the Tuscan school of Giovanni di Balduccio with his workshop, and on the other the Campionese Masters, the name given to a group of sculptors from families originating in Campione d'Italia whose style is difficult to distinguish and who often worked in collaboration, though for the school's major artists it is sometimes possible to indicate the author precisely.

Among the oldest Gothic sculptural monuments in Milan is the Funeral Monument to Ottone Visconti by an unidentified Campionese Master, dating from the late 13th century and preserved in the Milan Cathedral. The monument is made of red Verona marble with the structure of the sarcophagus with sloping pitches, a clear reference to Roman funeral monuments made of porphyry: the monument, supported by two columns added in the late 14th century, has the figure of the archbishop lying on the front pitch. This solution finds extensive precedents in French sculpture of the time, but especially in Arnolfo di Cambio's Funeral Monument of Cardinal De Braye at the church of San Domenico in Orvieto. The sarcophagus was the model of inspiration for the ark of Berardo Maggi, also of the Campionese school, preserved at the old cathedral in Brescia.

The greatest work by Giovanni di Balduccio and his workshop is the Ark of Saint Peter, preserved in the Portinari Chapel in the basilica of Sant'Eustorgio. The Carrara marble tomb, of monumental proportions and complex iconographic content, rests on eight pillars of red Verona marble on which are placed statues of the Virtues; the sides of the sarcophagus are decorated with eight bas-reliefs of the Episodes in the life of St. Peter separated by statues of Saints and Doctors of the Church. The lid is in the shape of a truncated pyramid, the gables of which are decorated with reliefs of Saints, crowned by a cusped tabernacle containing statues of the Virgin with Saints Dominic and Peter.

The composition introduces to the Lombard area the isolated complex funeral monument, that is, of the monument visible and decorated on all four sides: the Ark of St. Augustine, another among the most famous sculptural monuments of Lombard Gothic, was in its tripartite decoration marked by statues of saints crowned by a tabernacle inspired by Balducci's masterpiece, although in even more monumental forms.

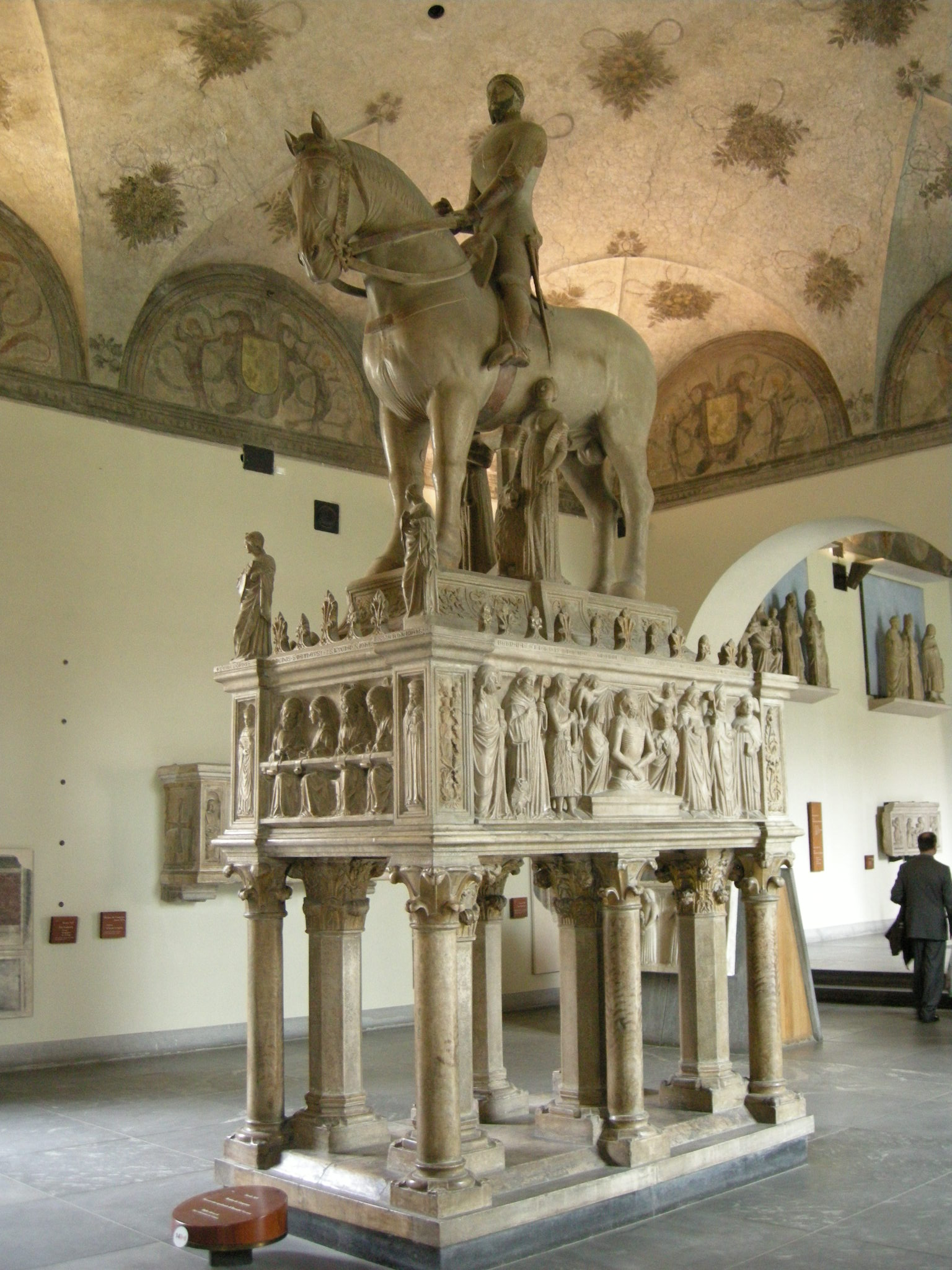
Equestrian monument to Bernabò Visconti by Bonino da Campione.

On the other hand, the masterpiece and highest expression of sculpture by the Campionese Masters is the Equestrian Monument to Bernabò Visconti by Bonino da Campione, originally placed at the church of San Giovanni in Conca. The monument, made from a single block of Carrara marble, consists of a sarcophagus supported by twelve columns of various shapes and sizes: as in the previous work, all four sides of the monument are visible and decorated with reliefs, respectively with the Coronation of the Virgin, the Evangelists, the Crucifixion with Saints and the Pietà with Saints. The sarcophagus is surmounted by the imposing equestrian statue of Bernabò, once painted, sided by allegories of Fortitude and Wisdom.

Bonino and his workshop, while incorporating the influences of Giovanni di Balduccio's Milanese work, show in the work a continuation of the Lombard naturalistic tradition, giving strong emphasis to minor details and decorations, while the main character is portrayed in a deliberately solemn and hieratic manner, far from the intensity and finesse of the Tuscan Balduccio tradition.

It was the Funeral Monument of Azzone Visconti by Giovanni di Balduccio, preserved in the church of San Gottardo in Corte, that introduced the funerary monument with a canopy supported on columns in the Lombard area: the decoration of the sarcophagus is very rich and consists of figures of saints, while at the top there are Angels holding a funeral curtain. The model was reproposed a few years later by the Campionese Masters in the creation of the Funeral Monument to Franchino Rusca.

In the basilica of Sant'Eustorgio is the Funeral Monument of Stefano and Valentina Visconti, an imposing composition where the sarcophagus is inserted in an aedicule with a cusp supported by twisted columns, attributed to Bonino da Campione for the attention to detail and in the decorative motifs. Also in the basilica is the Ark of the Magi, a marble triptych with compartments and the Ancona of the Passion with Scenes from the Life of Christ with convex ogival cusps at the top.

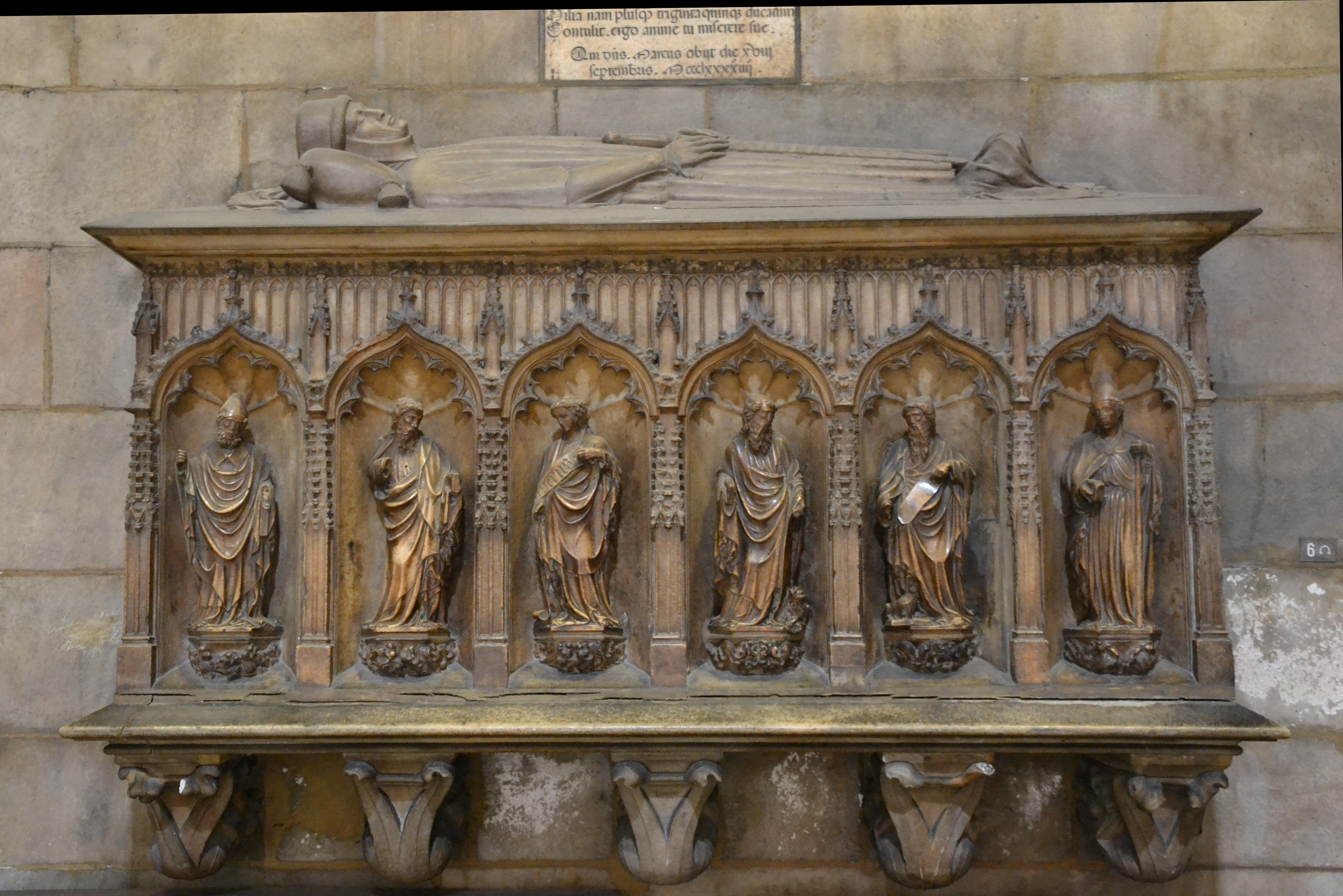
Funeral monument to Marco Carelli.

Other interesting fourteenth-century sculptural monuments are the Ark of Martino Aliprandi, the Ark of Salvarino Aliprandi and the Ark of Rebaldo Aliprandi, preserved in the church of San Marco, sculptural works with high attention to detail of Lombard naturalism attributed to unspecified Campionese masters. Also in the same church is the Funeral Monument of Lanfranco Settala, a late 14th-century monument exemplifying the influence of Giovanni di Balduccio in the Milanese area.

As for late Gothic 15th-century sculpture, mention may be made of the Funeral Monument to Pietro Torelli by Martino Benzoni and Luchino Cernuschi located in the chapel of the same name in Sant'Eustorgio. The sarcophagus rests on six elegant twisted columns, to which three stylophoric lions form a base: the case punctuated by five niches echoes the typology of the Funeral Monument to Marco Carelli by Jacopino at Milan Cathedral, in both cases with niches ending in a cusp. Above the sarcophagus lies the deceased and a canopy crowned by a funeral curtain held up by Angels, a structure taken from Azzone Visconti's Funeral Monument in San Gottardo, crowned by an aedicule with the benedictory God the Father inside. The composition, due to the softness of the robes and curtain, departs from the hieratic and solemn statuary production of the early Lombard Gothic period.

== See also ==
- Gothic art
- Gothic architecture
- History of architecture and art in Milan

== Bibliography ==
- Maria Grazia Balzarini (2000). Il Gotico. Milano: Nodo Libri.
- Miklos Boskovitz, ed. (1988). Arte in Lombardia tra gotico e rinascimento. Milano: Fabbri.
- Cesare Brandi (2013). Disegno dell'architettura italiana. Roma: Castelvecchi.
- Roberto Cassanelli, ed. (2002). Lombardia gotica. Milano: Jaca Book.
- Francesco Paolo Fiore, ed. (1998). Il Quattrocento. Milano: Electa.
- Maria Teresa Fiorio (2006). Chiese di Milano. Milano: Electa.
- Paolo Mezzanotte; Giacomo Bascapè (1968). Milano nell'arte e nella storia. Milano: Bestetti 1198.
- Maria Cristina Passoni; Jacopo Stoppa (2000). Il tardogotico e il Rinascimento. Milano: Nodo libri.
- Marco Rossi, ed. (2005). Lombardia gotica e tardogotica. Milano: Skira.
- Laura Cavazzini (2004). Il crepuscolo della scultura medievale in Lombardia. Firenze: Leo Olschki editore.
