= Temperance (tarot card) =

Tarot card of the Major Arcana

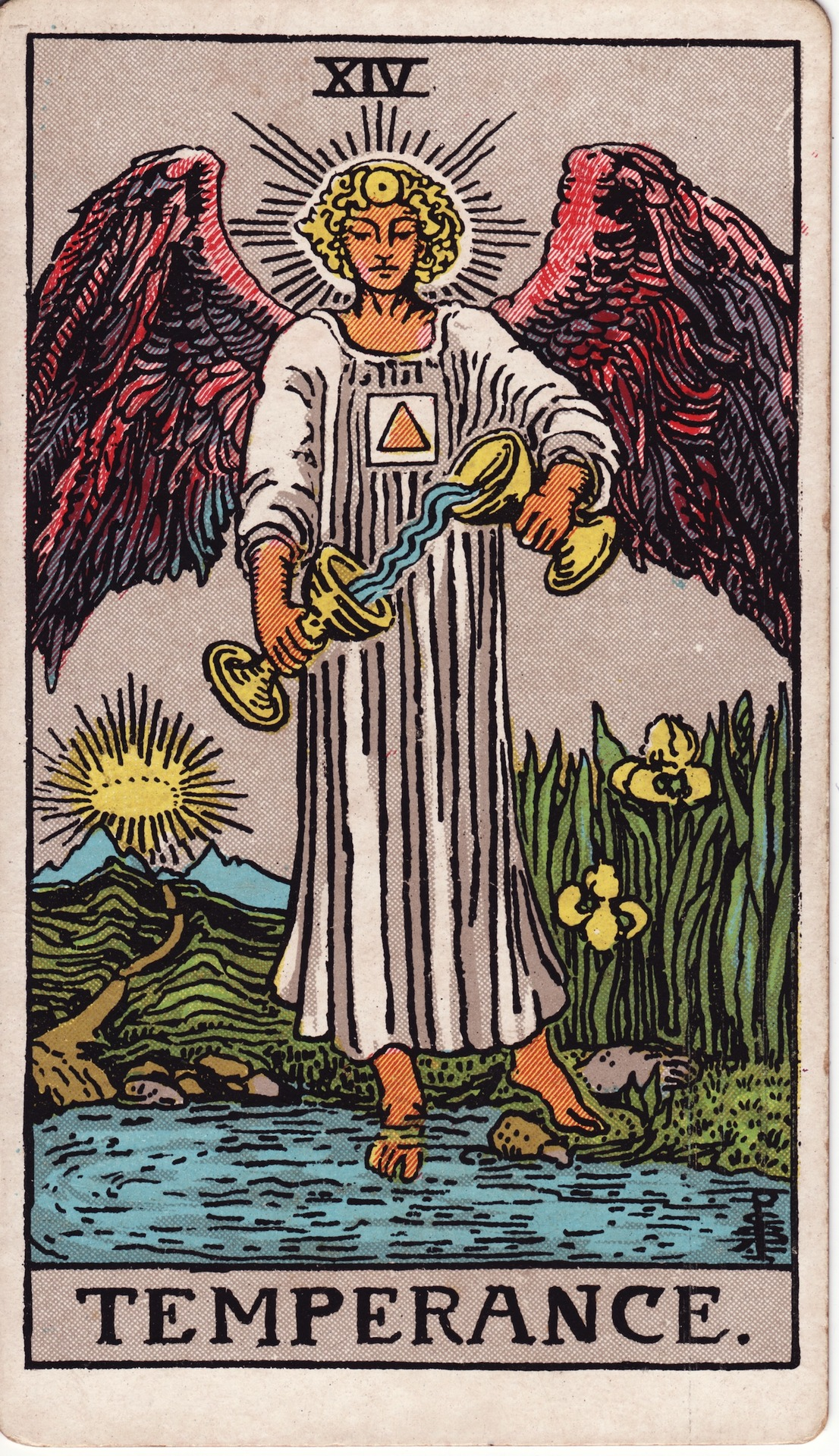
Temperance (XIV) from the Rider–Waite tarot deck

Temperance (XIV) is one of the 22 Major Arcana cards in Tarot decks. It is usually numbered 14. It depicts a figure which represents the virtue Temperance. Along with Justice and Strength, it is one of three Virtues which are given their own cards in traditional tarot. It is used in both game playing and in divination.

== Identity of the figure ==
Temperance almost invariably depicts a figure with pouring liquid from one cup to another. This figure is usually referred to as the virtue Temperance or as an angel, though several other interpretations also exist. In particular, Paul Huson suggests that the figure once represented Ganymede, who served as cup bearer to Zeus. Though it is possible that the figure could also be the goddess Iris or the archangel Michael. The former of these interpretations is supported by the rainbow which is often added above his (or her) head and the fact that the flowers pictured in the Rider–Waite Tarot version of the card are Irises.

== Description ==
Temperance (Italian: La Temperanza) appears in the oldest Italian decks where it is numbered VI or VII. In the Tarot de Marseille and in most contemporary decks the card is numbered XIV. In the Thoth Tarot and decks influenced by it, this card is called Art rather than Temperance.

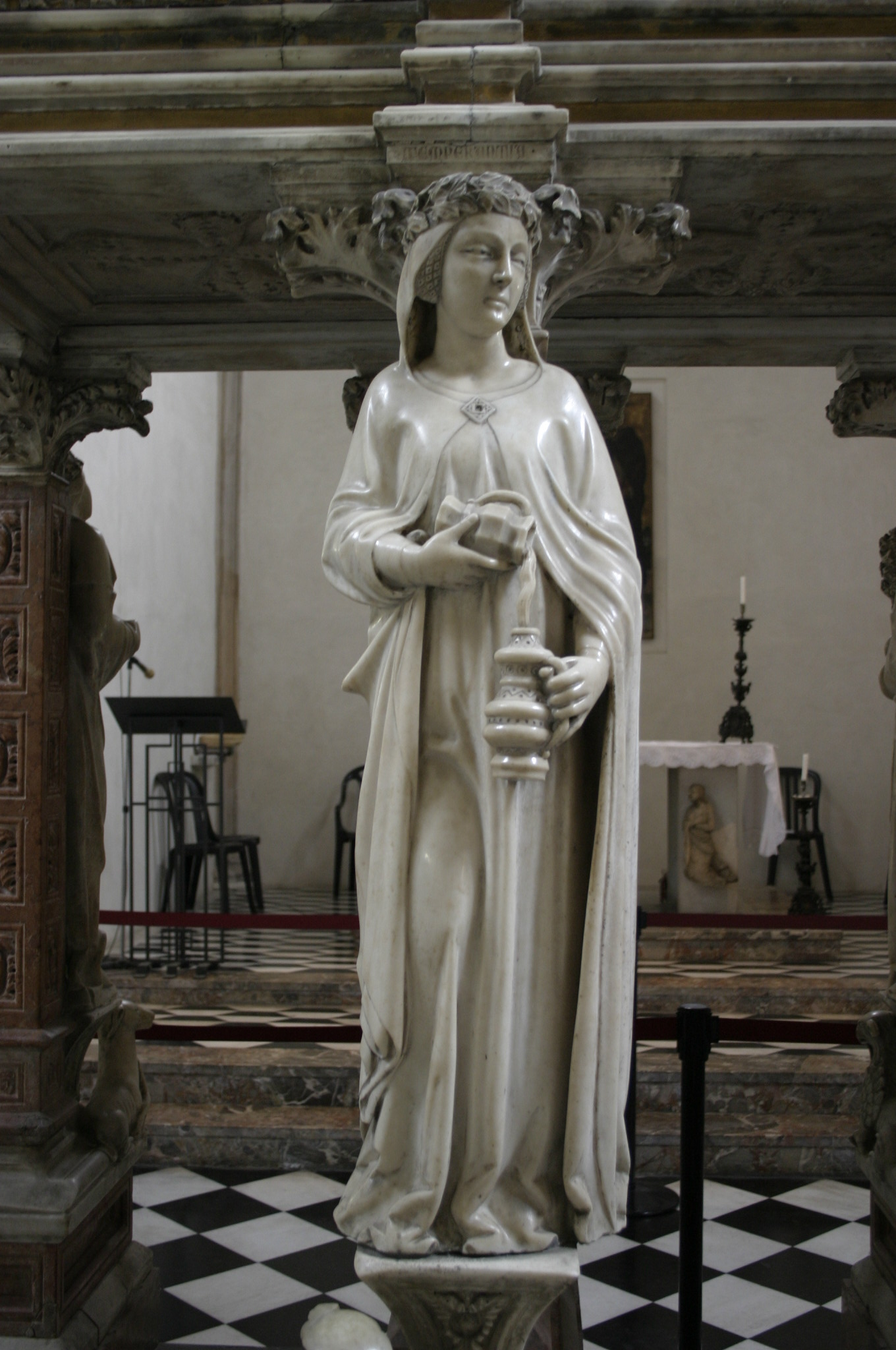
A woman mixing water into wine was a standard allegory of Temperance in European iconography. This statue is part of Peter of Verona's tomb in the Cappella Portinari chapel, in the Basilica of Sant'Eustorgio

Temperance is almost invariably depicted as a person pouring liquid from one receptacle into another. Historically, this was a standard symbol of the virtue temperance, one of the cardinal virtues, representing the dilution of wine with water. In many decks, the person is a winged angel, usually female or androgynous, and stands with one foot on water and one foot on land.

At the end of the path in the lower left part of the card, there is a crown to show the attainment of a goal, or mastery thereof.

In the Rider–Waite image by Pamela Coleman-Smith (shown on this page) the Hebrew Tetragrammaton is on the angel's chest above the square and triangle. In the derivative Tarot decks this is usually not included.

According to A.E. Waite's 1910 book The Pictorial Key to the Tarot, the Temperance card is associated with:

14.TEMPERANCE.--Economy, moderation, frugality, management, accommodation. Reversed: Things connected with churches, religions, sects, the priesthood, sometimes even the priest who will marry the Querent; also disunion, unfortunate combinations, competing interests.

In astrology, the Temperance card is associated with the masculine, mutable-fire sign of Sagittarius and its ruling planet, Jupiter.
