= Santa Maria in Brera =

- Santa Maria di Brera; Santa Maria nella Brera
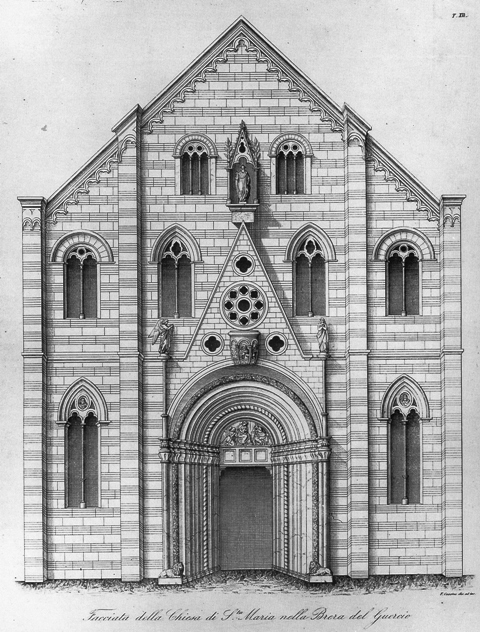
- Eighteenth-century engraving of the Gothic façade of the church added by Giovanni di Balduccio in 1346–48
- Santa Maria in Brera
- 45.4716°N 9.1886°E
- Location: Piazzetta Brera, Milan
- Country: Italy
- Denomination: Roman Catholic

History
- Status: partially demolished
- Founded: 1180–1229
- Founder: Humiliati

Architecture
- Functional status: deconsecrated
- Architect: Giovanni di Balduccio
- Closed: 1806
- Demolished: 1808–09

Santa Maria in Brera was a church in Milan, in Lombardy in northern Italy. It was built by the Humiliati between 1180 and 1229, given a marble façade and Gothic portal by Giovanni di Balduccio in the fourteenth century, and deconsecrated and partly demolished under Napoleonic rule in the early nineteenth century. The Napoleonic rooms of the Pinacoteca di Brera occupy the upper floor of what was the nave.

== History ==
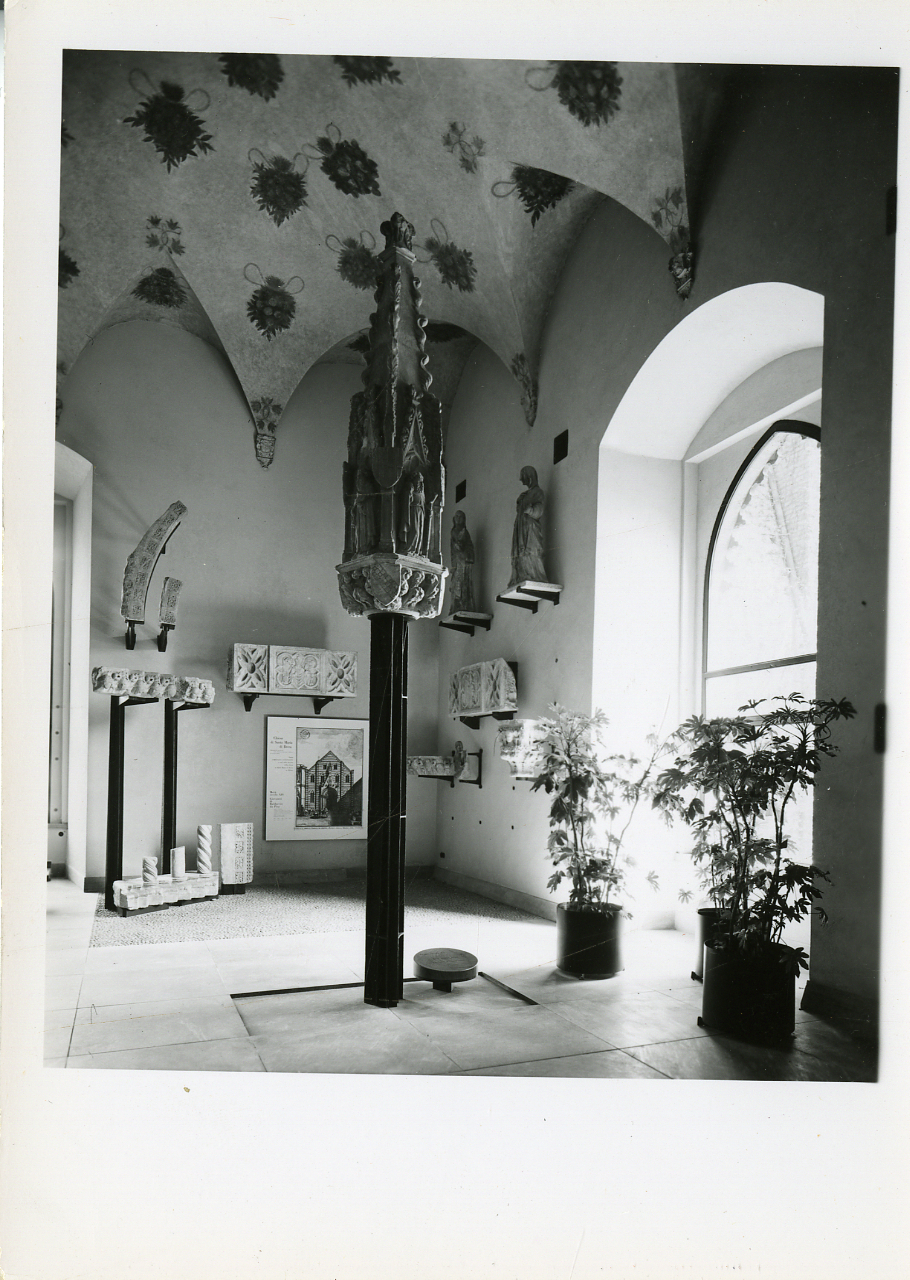
Fragments of the church portal in the Ancient Art Museum of the Castello Sforzesco, hall 4. Photo by Paolo Monti, Milan, 1956.

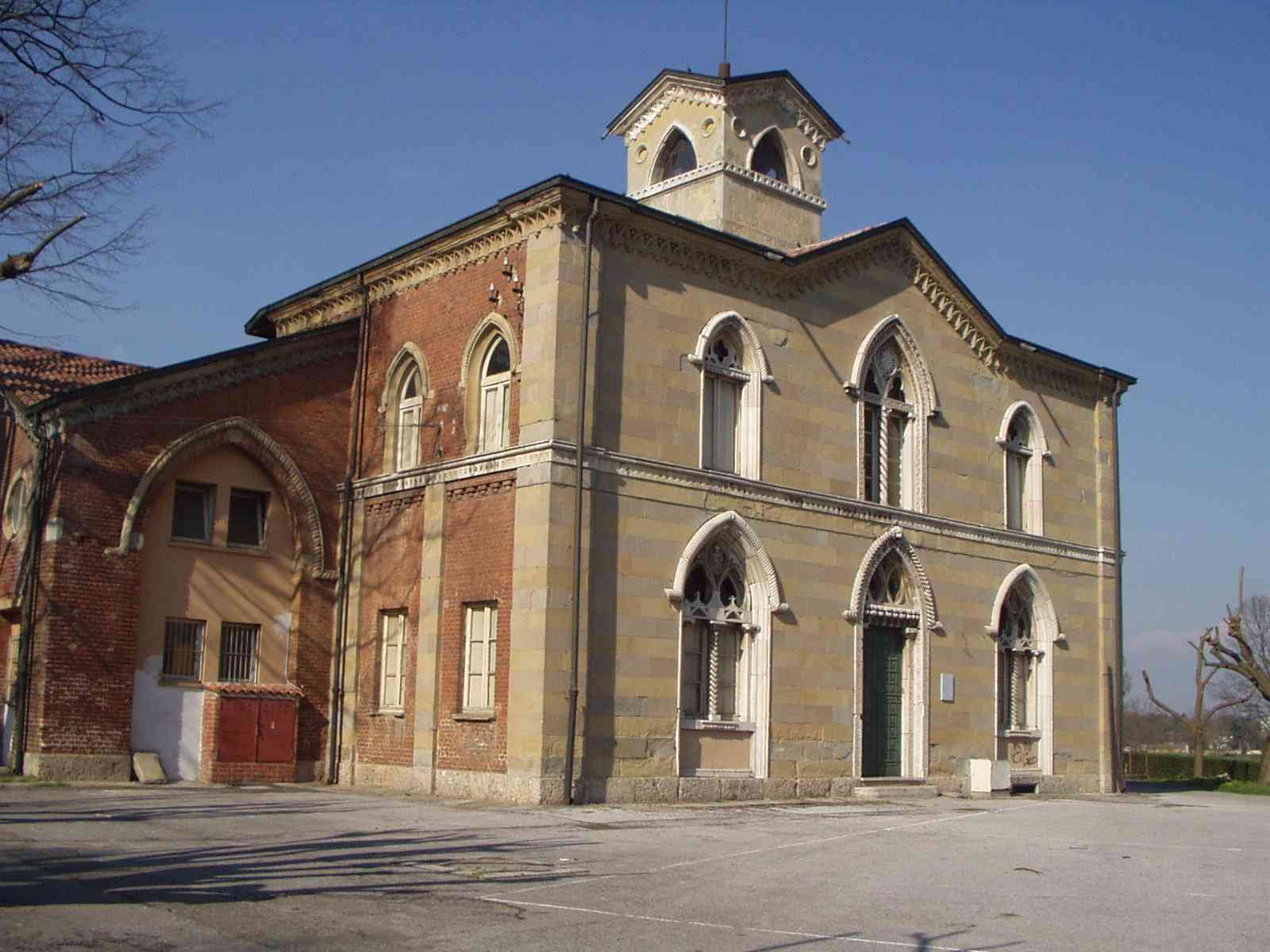
Material from the church incorporated in the façade of the Cascina San Fedele

Santa Maria in Brera was built between 1180 and 1229 as the church of a monastery of the order of the Humiliati. This was built on the lands of Guercio da Baggio, who may have been consul between 1150 and 1188, which shortly before 1178 passed into the hands of the order. A façade of horizontal stripes of white and grey marble, with ogival windows and a Gothic marble portal, was added by the Pisan sculptor Giovanni di Balduccio between 1346 and 1348. There were frescoes by Giovanni da Milano, Vincenzo Foppa and Bernardino Luini.

After the suppression of the Humiliati by Pius V on 7 February, 1571, the monastery became – at the request of Carlo Borromeo and with the approval of Gregory XIII – a Jesuit college. To house it, Palazzo Brera was built to the north of the church, to designs of Francesco Maria Richini, from about 1615. Following the suppression of the Jesuits by Clement XIV on 21 July 1773, the palace passed to the government, at that time that of the Austrian Habsburg dynasty.

The church was deconsecrated in 1806. After the Napoleonic suppression of the convents in the early 19th century, the façade was torn down, and the nave was divided horizontally. The upper floor became the Napoleonic rooms of the new Galleria Reale (now the Pinacoteca di Brera), the art gallery of the Accademia di Belle Arti; the lower floor housed the sculptures of the museum of antiquities.

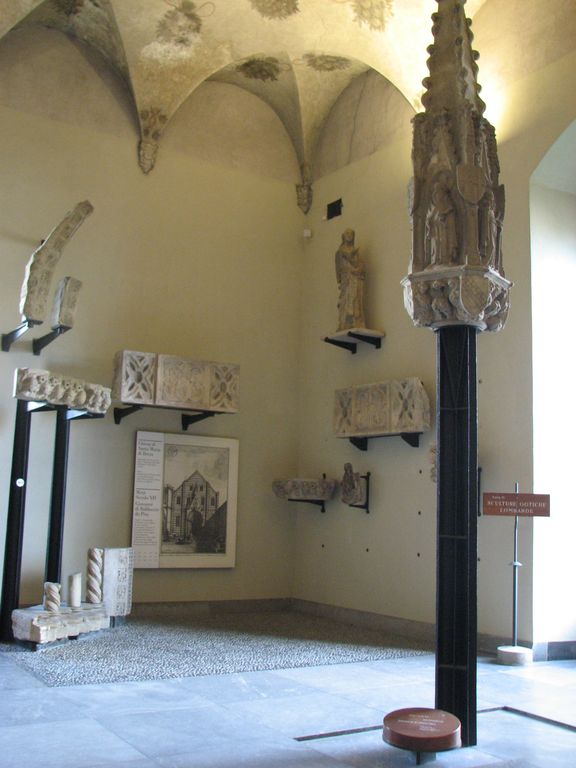
Remains of the portal in the Museo d'Arte Antica of the Castello Sforzesco

Parts of the façade, including the ogival windows and some of the facing of grey and white marble, were incorporated by Luigi Canonica in the Cascina San Fedele, in the park of the villa of the viceroy Eugène de Beauharnais, Napoleon's nephew. Fragments of the portal are preserved in Room IV of the Museo d'Arte Antica in the Sforza Castle.

== Gallery ==
Details of the façade of the Cascina San Fedele

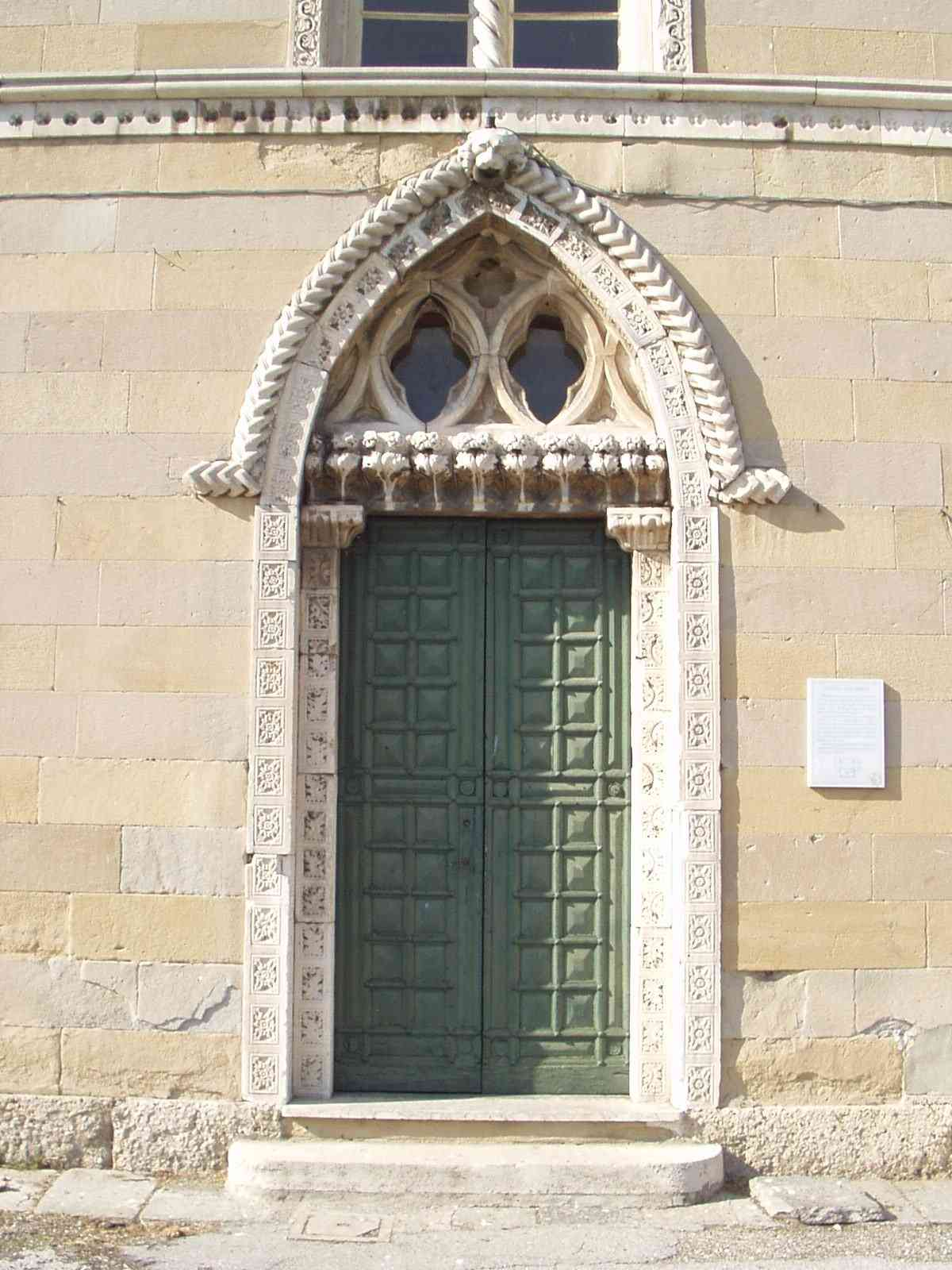

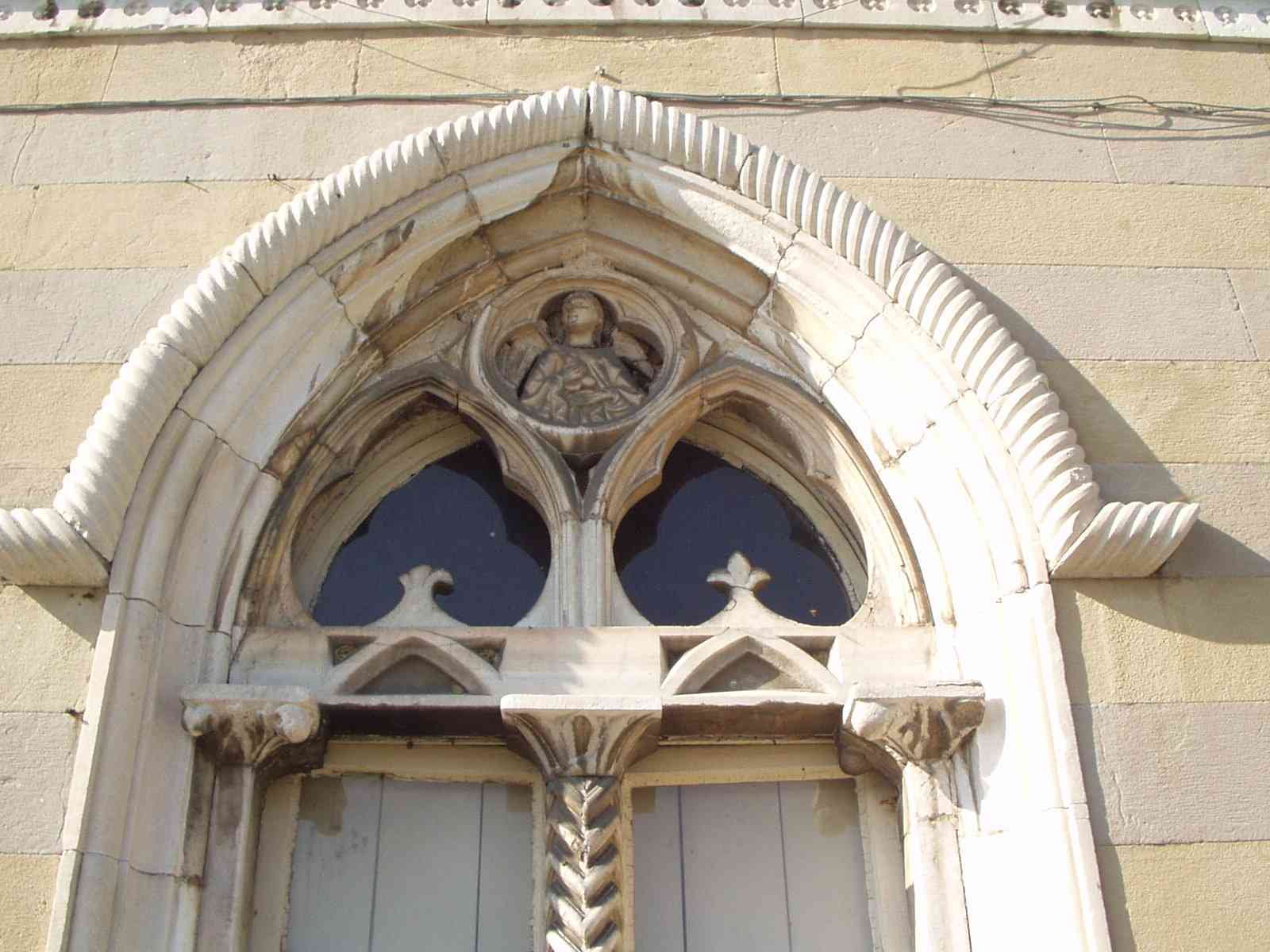

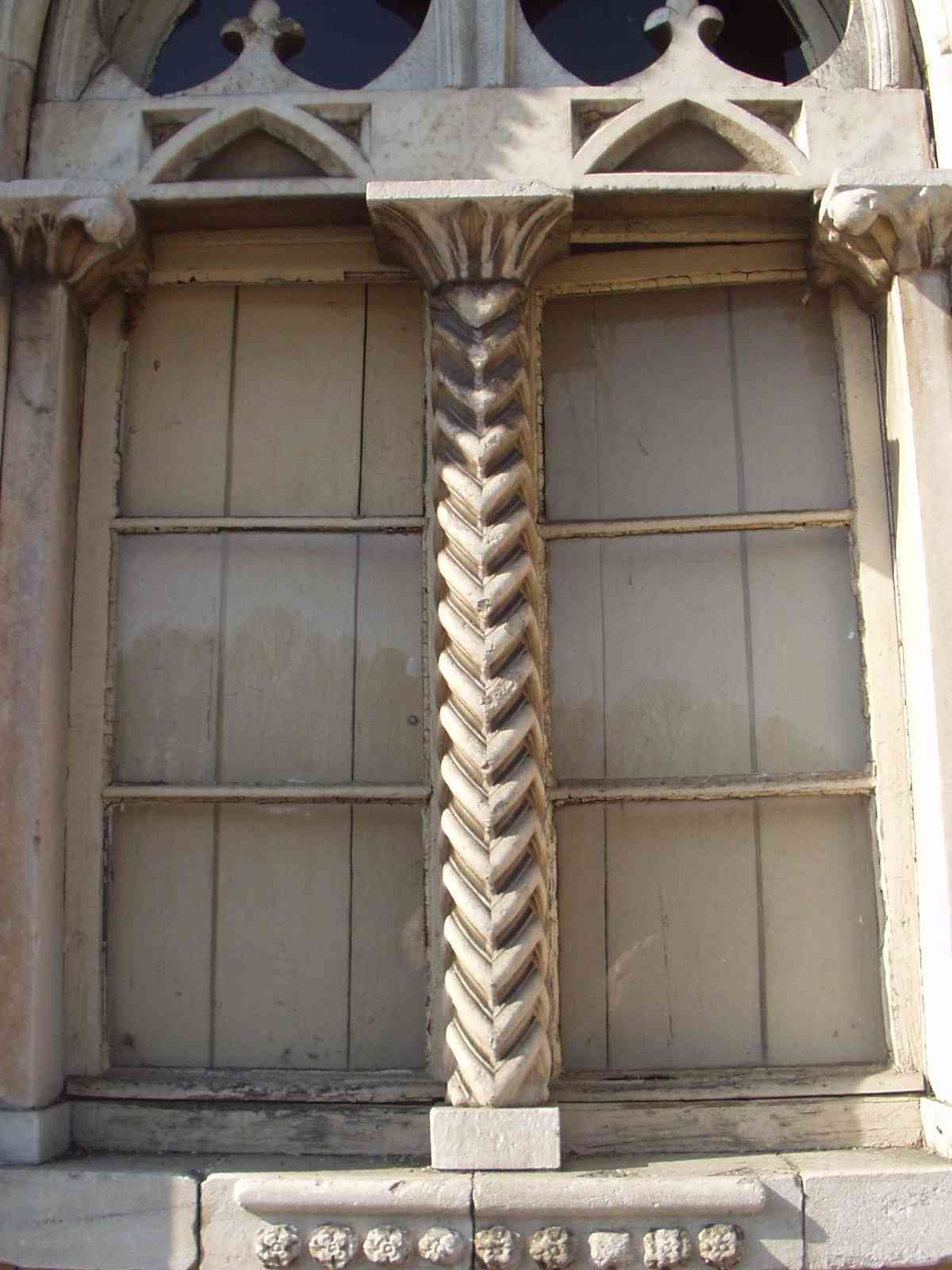

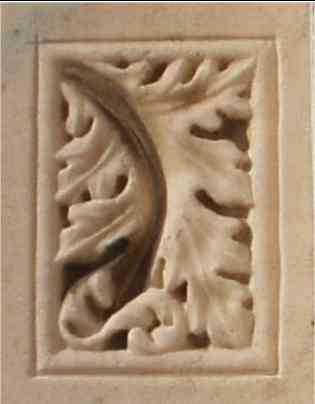

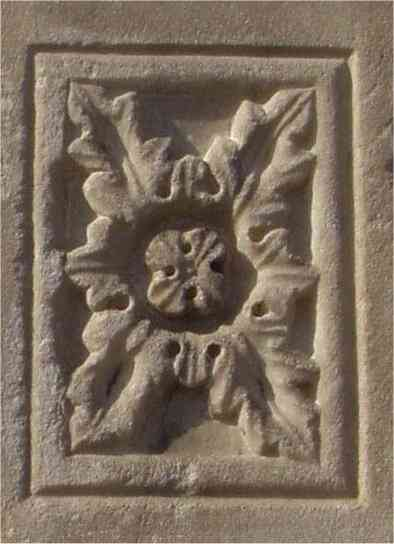
