= Giovanni di Balduccio =

Italian sculptor

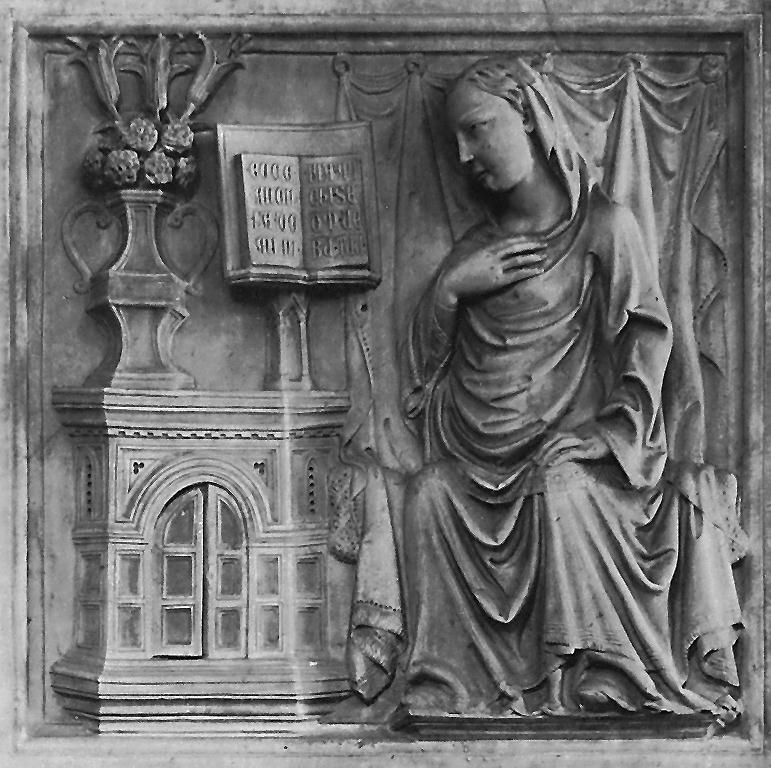
Giovanni di Balduccio, Annunciation, Chiesa della Misericordia (San Casciano in Val di Pesa)

Giovanni di Balduccio (c. 1290 – after 1339) was an Italian sculptor of the Medieval period.

== Life ==
The artist was born in Pisa, and likely did not train directly with the famous Pisan sculptor Andrea Pisano. He travelled to Milan to help sculpt the arc of St. Peter Martyr now in the Portinari Chapel, in the Basilica of Sant'Eustorgio, work signed in 1339. He also worked on the portal of the church of the Brera in Milan. He also worked in San Casciano in Val di Pesa and in the monument of Guarniero in Sarzana.

His style is known from four signed works. These formed the basis for a reconstruction of his oeuvre.

Recently, the ark of Saint Augustine, preserved in the Basilica of San Pietro in Ciel d'Oro in Pavia and built between 1362 and 1365 (but not completely finished), has been attributed, as already suggested by important scholars, such as Wilhelm Valentiner and Francesco Caglioti, the Pisan master. In all probability, Giovanni did not die in 1349, but remained operational in Lombardy at least until 1365, the year in which the work of the ark of Saint Augustine was interrupted, which was then made by Giovanni di Balduccio, now elderly, along with some of his students.

== Secondary Sources ==
- Ticozzi, Stefano (1830). Dizionario degli architetti, scultori, pittori, intagliatori in rame ed in pietra, coniatori di medaglie, musaicisti, niellatori, intarsiatori d'ogni etá e d'ogni nazione (Volume 1). Milan: Gaetano Schiepatti. pp. 99–100.
