= Basilica of Sant'Eustorgio =

Roman Catholic Basilica in Milan, Italy

Basilica of Saint Eustorgius (Basilica of Sant'Eustorgio)
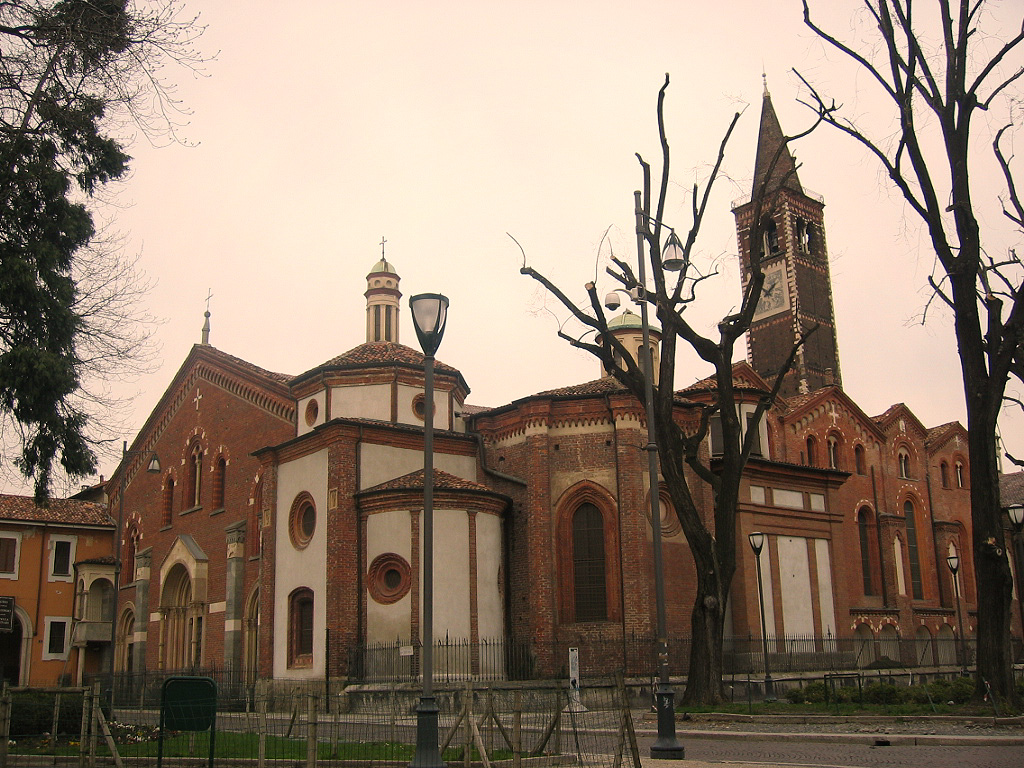
- The right side of the church.

Religion
- Affiliation: Roman Catholic
- Province: Archdiocese of Milan
- Rite: Ambrosian
- Status: Active

Location
- Location: Milan, Italy
- Interactive map of Basilica of Saint Eustorgius (Basilica of Sant'Eustorgio)
- Coordinates: 45°27′14.40″N 9°10′52.80″E

Architecture
- Architect: Pellegrino Tibaldi
- Type: Church
- Style: First Romanesque
- Groundbreaking: 4th century
- Completed: 16th century

Website
- Official website

The Basilica of Sant'Eustorgio is a church in Milan in northern Italy, which is in the Basilicas Park city park. It was for many years an important stop for pilgrims on their journey to Rome or to the Holy Land, because it was said to contain the tomb of the Three Magi or Three Kings.

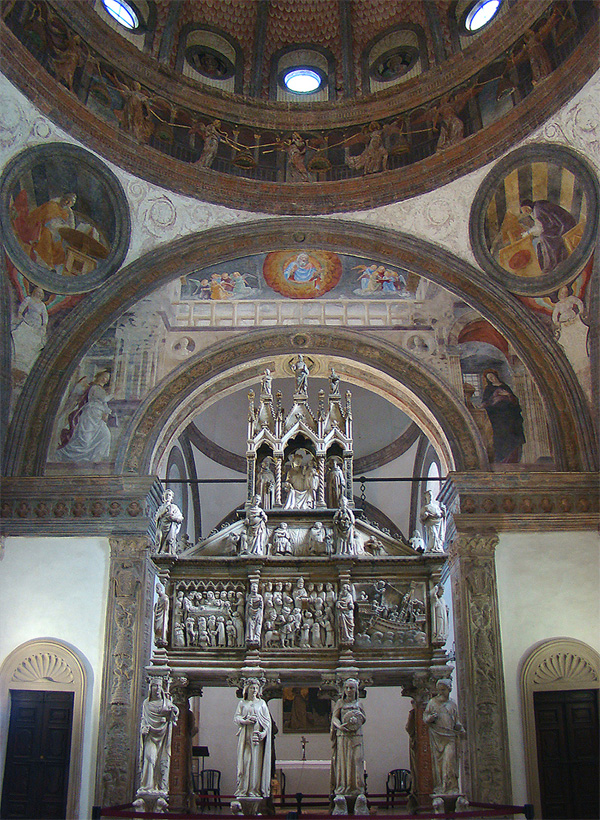
The Portinari Chapel with the tomb of Saint Peter Martyr by Giovanni di Balduccio and dated 1339.

Probably founded in the 4th century, its name refers to Eustorgius I, the bishop of Milan to whom is attributed the translation of the supposed relics of the Magi to the city from Constantinople in 344. In 1764, when an ancient pillar was removed, a Christian burial was discovered, housing coins of emperor Constans, the son of Constantine the Great.

The church was later rebuilt in Romanesque style. In the 12th century, when Milan was sacked by Frederick Barbarossa, the relics of the Magi were appropriated and subsequently taken to Cologne. It was only in 1903/4 that fragments of the bones and garments were sent back to Sant'Eustorgio's. Nowadays they are in the Three Kings altar nearby the empty Three Kings sarcophagus. Still today, in memory of the Three Kings, the bell tower is surmounted by a star instead of the traditional cross.

From the 13th century the church was the main Milanese seat of the Dominican Order, who promoted its rebuilding. The current façade is a 19th-century reconstruction. The interior has a nave and two aisles, covered with groin vaults. Of the Romanesque church only parts of the apse remain, while of the original Early Christian building, remains have been excavated also under the apse.

To the right side of the nave, the church has chapels commissioned from the 14th century onwards by the main families of the city. The first from the entrance is of the 15th century and has a Renaissance sepulchre and a triptych by Ambrogio Bergognone. The three others are more ancient, having frescoes of the Giotto school and tombs of members of the Visconti family. The high altar is an imposing marble polyptych of the early 15th century, while a similar work is in the right transept, next to the Early Christian sarcophagus of the Magi. Also noteworthy are a Crucifixion on a table by a Venetian artist of the 13th century and St. Ambrose Defeating Arius by Ambrogio Figino of the late 16th century.

Behind the apse is the most striking feature of the church, the Portinari Chapel (1462–1468), one of the most celebrated examples of Renaissance art in Lombardy. It has frescoes by Vincenzo Foppa and a marble sepulchre by Giovanni di Balduccio, a 14th-century pupil of Giovanni Pisano. The chapel also houses an important Dominican monument, the Ark (tomb) of Saint Peter of Verona, which is replete with marble bass-relief images by the sculptor, Giovanni di Balduccio.

== Other burials ==
- Stefano Visconti
- Bonacossa Borri
- Matteo I Visconti

== See also ==
- Late medieval domes
- Italian Renaissance domes
