= Portinari Chapel =

Renaissance chapel in Milan, Italy

Coordinates: 45.4541°N 9.18216°E

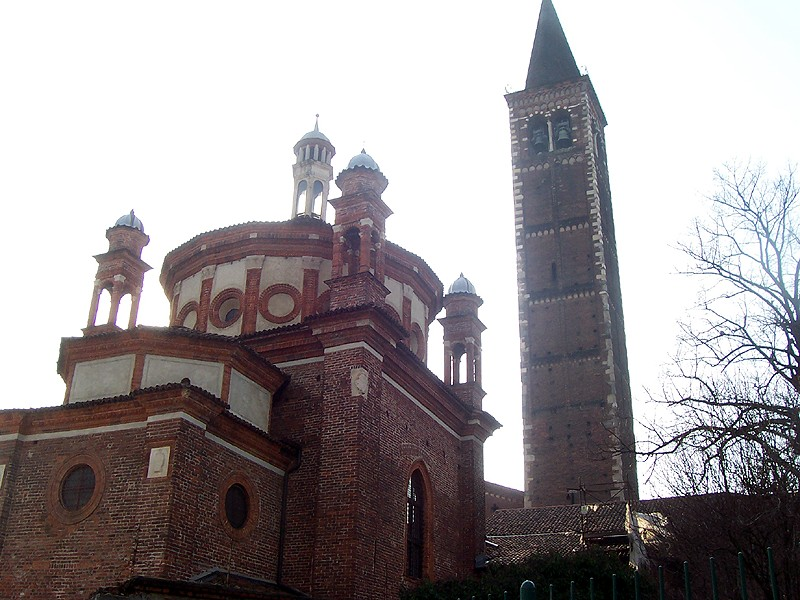
The Portinari Chapel and the campanile of Sant’Eustorgio

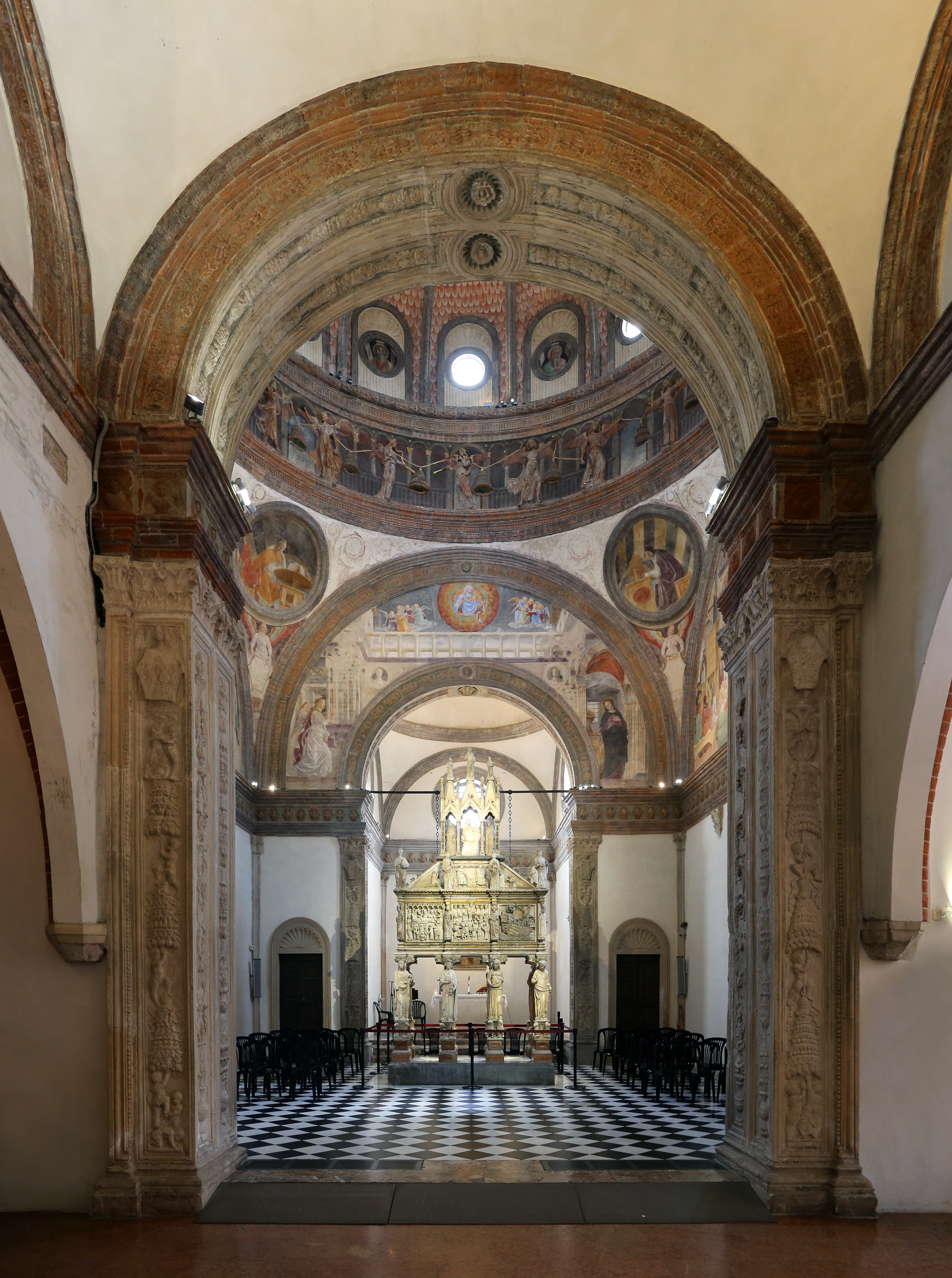
Interior facing east. The Annunciation is depicted above the archway which forms the entrance to the apse; the two doors to the side were only opened in 1874–75.

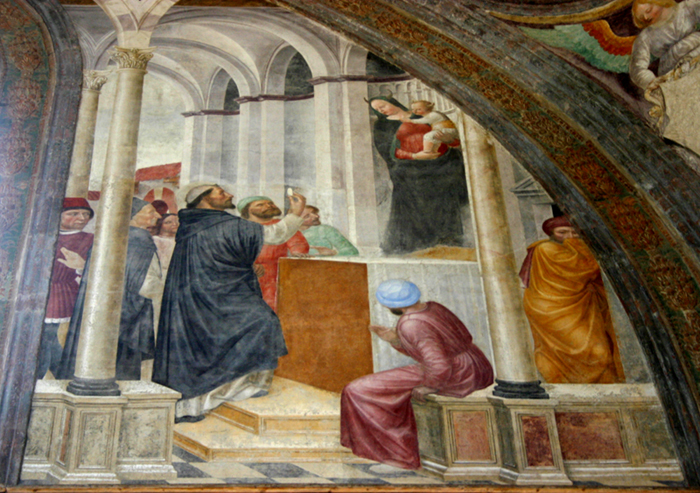
Vincenzo Foppa, Scene from the life of Peter of Verona, south wall of the chapel. In the ‘Miracle of the Host’, the saint reveals an apparition of the Madonna and Child (note their horns) as a Devilish simulacrum.

The Portinari Chapel (Italian: Cappella Portinari) is a Renaissance chapel at the Basilica of Sant'Eustorgio, Milan, northern Italy. Commenced in 1460 and completed in 1468, it was commissioned by Pigello Portinari as a private sepulchre and to house a silver shrine given by Archbishop Giovanni Visconti in 1340 containing the relic head of St. Peter of Verona, to whom the chapel is consecrated. The architect is unknown, the traditional attribution to Michelozzo having been succeeded with equal uncertainty by attributions to either Filarete or Guiniforte Solari, architect of the apses of the Certosa di Pavia and the church of San Pietro in Gessate in Milan.

== The commission ==
The Portinari Chapel, which has been described as a work of Tuscan architecture in Lombardy, was commissioned by the Florentine nobleman Pigello Portinari (1421–1468), who became the representative in Milan of the Medici bank in 1452. (His younger brother Tommaso, also a Medici banker and patron, would commission the Portinari Altarpiece from Hugo van der Goes in 1475.) The building was intended to function both as a family chapel and mortuary and to house the relics of Saint Peter of Verona who, as patron saint of inquisitors, was of particular importance to the Dominicans of Sant’Eustorgio: their convent had housed the Milan inquisition since the 1230s.

Above the chapel’s altar a donor portrait from 1462, sometimes attributed to Giovanni da Vaprio, depicts Pigello Portinari kneeling in prayer before Peter of Verona. This image may be the origin of the legend that Peter appeared in a vision to Pigello, commanding him to build a chapel in which his remains might be honourably preserved. Pigello Portinari was interred here in 1468, but the saint’s head remained in the sacristy and his tomb was not moved into the chapel until 1737.

== Description ==
The chapel is located at the eastern end of the Basilica of Sant'Eustorgio. From the exterior it is a compact cubic brick building with a lower-roofed, projecting square apse. The main body of the chapel is surmounted by a dome with sloping tiled roof supporting a high lantern, framed by four turrets. The dome of the apse is protected by an octagonal structure, again capped with a tiled roof.

Internally the chapel has architectural features that bear similarity to the Sagrestia Vecchia by Filippo Brunelleschi. The interior spaces are defined by architectural orders, pilasters, architraves, mouldings, pendentives and a ribbed dome with all the details picked out in grey stone that contrasts with the flat plaster surfaces. These architectonic features are in places richly ornamented with formal motifs in relief.

A number of the surfaces have been painted in fresco in the Lombardy manner by Vincenzo Foppa. In the pendentives supporting the dome are tondi with the Doctors of the Church while on the side walls are four Scenes from the life of St. Peter of Verona. Above the arch which marks the entrance to the apse is an Annunciation and, facing it above the arch which forms the entrance to the chapel, an Assumption of the Virgin. The frescos were rediscovered in 1878 and restored at the beginning of the twentieth century.

In 1736 the elaborate marble sepulchre of Peter of Verona, commissioned in 1336 from Giovanni di Balduccio (a pupil of Giovanni Pisano), was moved from the basilica into the Portinari Chapel and placed at the back of the apse; the following year a marble altar was erected in front of it, on which was placed the silver shrine containing the saint’s head. In the 1880s the sepulchre, which had been hidden away awkwardly behind the altar, was moved into the main body of the chapel and placed somewhat off-centre, where it would be well lit by the lateral windows, and where it still stands. The head, however, is today conserved in a small adjacent chapel.

The Chapel also includes a number of paintings by anonymous Lombard artists, including frescoes such as the Miracolo della nuvola e Miracolo della falsa Madonna, and a depiction of the martyrdom of St Peter Martyr.

== In popular culture ==
The "Miracle of the Host and the False Madonna" painting was the basis of the plot of the 2021 horror film, The Unholy.

== See also ==
- Late medieval domes
- Italian Renaissance domes
