= History of architecture and art in Milan =

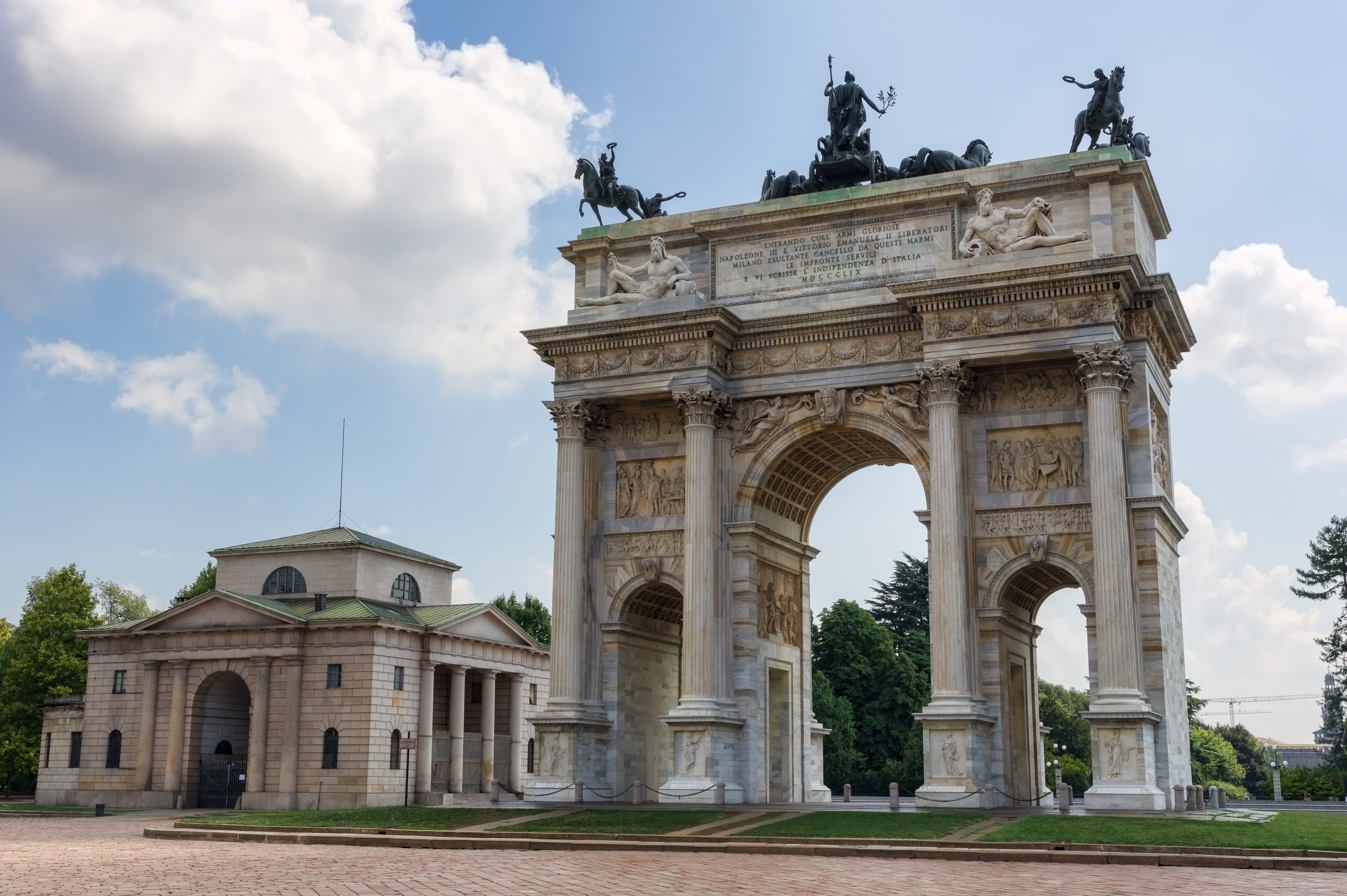
The Arch of Peace, the most famous example of neoclassicism in Milan

The architectural and artistic presence in Milan represents one of the attractions of the Lombard capital. Milan has been among the most important Italian centers in the history of architecture, has made important contributions to the development of art history, and has been the cradle of a number of modern art movements.

== History ==
=== Gothic style ===
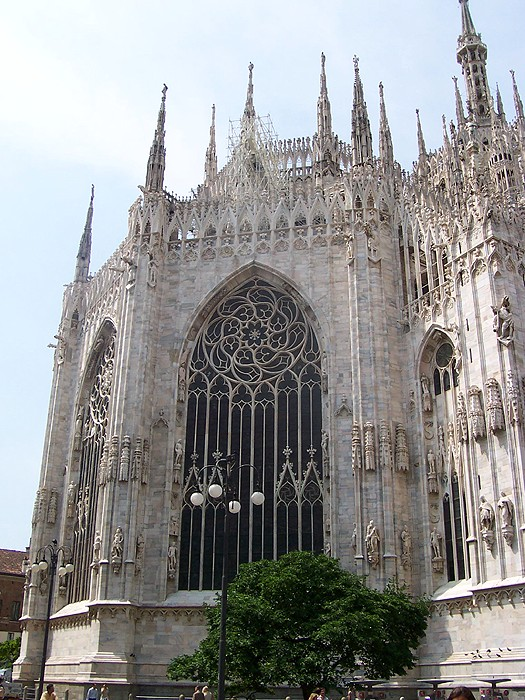
Glimpse of Milan Cathedral, the most famous example of Milanese Gothic style

The Milanese Gothic style was an urban artistic movement at the turn of the second half of the 13th century and the first half of the 15th century that was initially introduced into Milanese territory by Cistercian monks. It was the main artistic style of the vast patronage and self-celebrating agenda of the Viscontis, lords of Milan, whose rule over the city is usually associated with the Milanese Gothic period.

The conventional date of the beginning of the Gothic period in the territory of the lordship of Milan is often given as the Visconti family's rise to power in 1282. Thus, the penetration of the new artistic trends from beyond the Alps came later than in central Italy, where Cistercian Gothic had already produced almost a century earlier the Abbey of Fossanova (1187) and the Abbey of Casamari (1203). This delay in the introduction of the Gothic style in the Milanese area can be explained by the strong and deep-rooted presence of Romanesque architecture, also by virtue of the link between this architecture and the Empire, which was not by chance overcome only with the new political course of the Visconti seigniory.

The date, however, is only indicative since the first example of Gothic appeared in Milan by Cistercian monks in the first half of the 13th century: in 1221 the abbey of Chiaravalle was consecrated by Bishop Enrico Settala. At the same time, however, the Gothic style did not spread noticeably in the area, moreover with stylistic features strongly influenced by Romanesque, until the work of Azzone Visconti between 1329 and 1339, who introduced artists from Pisa and Florence to his court.

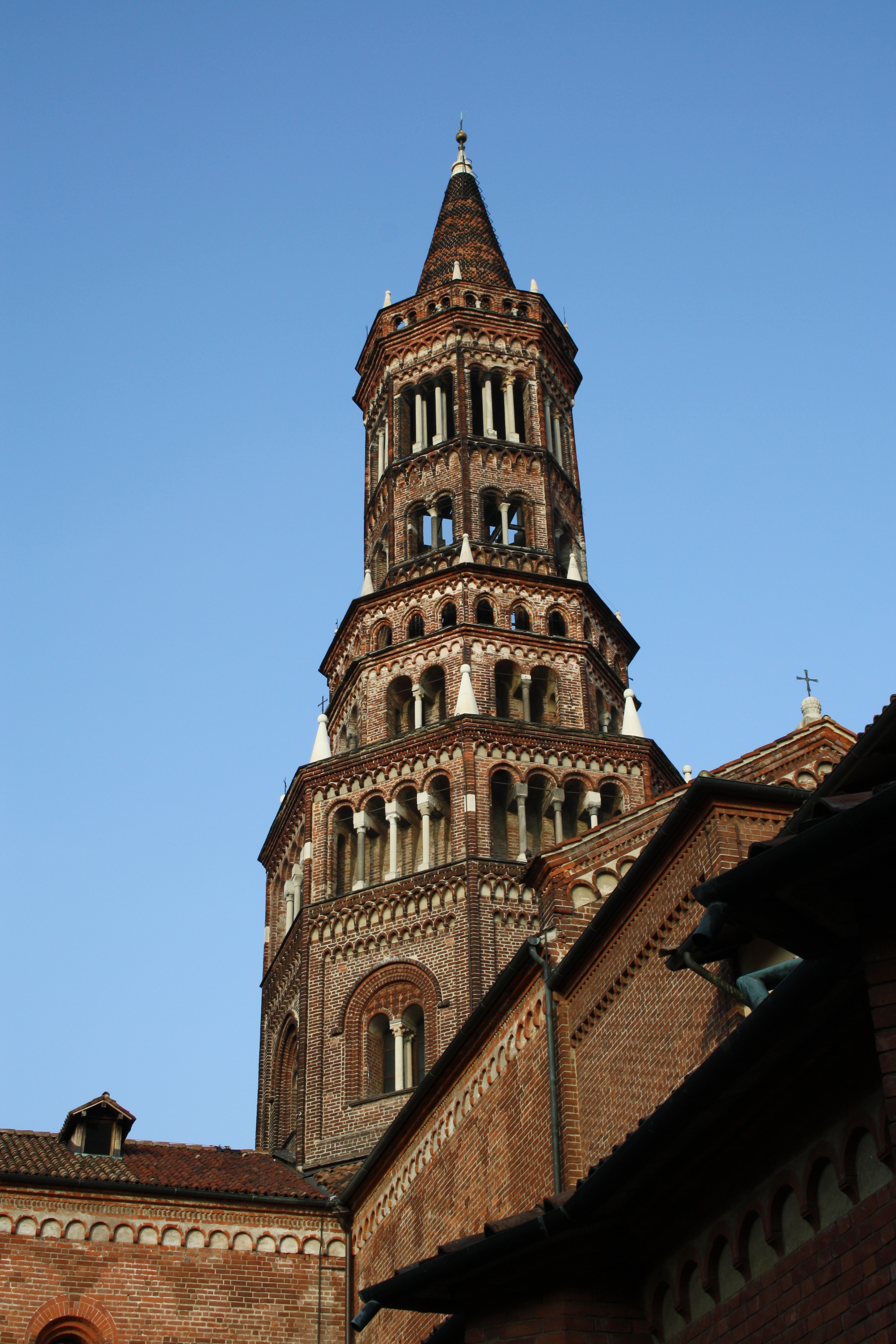
Bell tower of the abbey of Chiaravalle

The dense agenda of support for the arts inaugurated by Azzone Visconti was continued by his successor Bernabò Visconti, but above all by Gian Galeazzo: under his lordship the largest Italian Gothic building site for the construction of the new city cathedral was inaugurated. For this work, which in the duke's mind would have been monumental and grandiose, architects and artists from all over Europe were called to Milan: the continuous exchange between local and foreign workers helped to bring to maturity the Lombard Gothic style, which before then had been anchored to the strong Romanesque heritage, creating a synthesis between Italian and European Gothic architecture.

After a setback due to a turbulent political period after the death of Gian Galeazzo Visconti, Milan's artistic splendor resumed vigor under Filippo Maria Visconti, who in the first half of the 15th century transformed the Milanese court into one of the major centers of Italian humanism, calling to his service such personalities as Francesco Filelfo, Pier Candido Decembrio, Gasparino Barzizza and Antonio da Rho. In the last years of the Visconti seigniory, similarly to what happened in Florence, there were then the first hints of the new Renaissance art with the work of Masolino da Panicale in Castiglione Olona.

The end of the Gothic period is thus indicatively made to coincide with the collapse of the Visconti seigniory in 1447, with a late Gothic style that would be grafted onto the early central Italian Renaissance period giving rise to the Lombard Renaissance.

=== Art of the sixteenth century ===
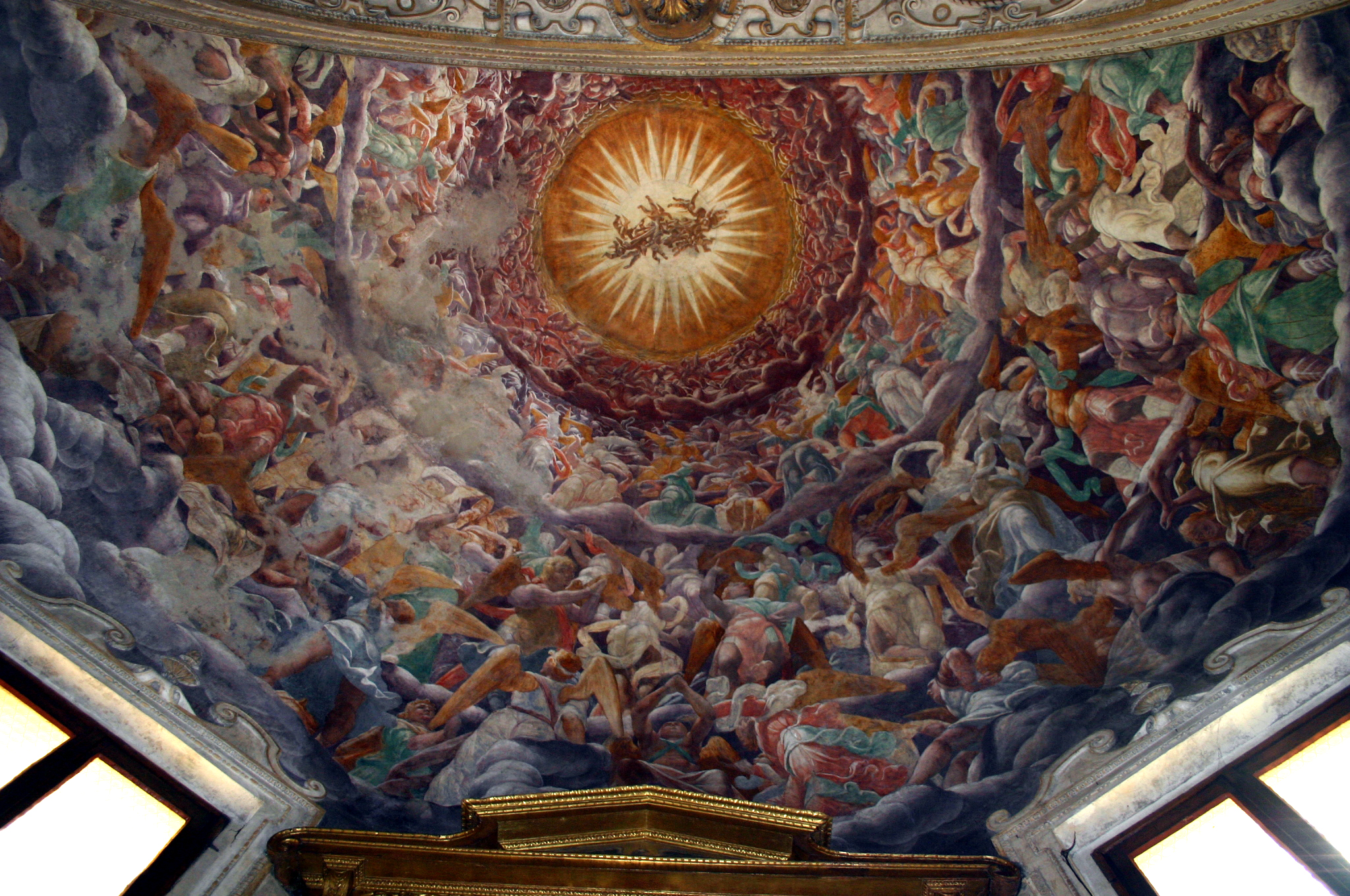
Giovanni Paolo Lomazzo, Gloria Angelica, Foppa Chapel, Church of San Marco, a typical example of art of the second half of the 16th century in Milan

The Milanese art scene of the second half of the 16th century must be analyzed by considering the particular position of the city: while for the Spanish Empire it represented a strategic military outpost, from the religious point of view it was at the center of the conflict between the Catholic and Reformed Churches. Consequently, the greatest contribution was made by religious art in the face of less civil artistic and architectural production. While in adopting the Mannerist style the city's patrons and artists had as a point of reference examples of central-Italian derivation, the city's location near Protestant Switzerland made Milan one of the main centers of the flowering and elaboration of Counter-Reformation art, thanks to the widespread action of St. Charles Borromeo.

Domenico Giunti from Tuscany and Galeazzo Alessi from Perugia were the first architects to break away from the Lombard late Renaissance tradition. To the former are due the church of San Paolo Converso and the church of Sant'Angelo, set according to the same construction scheme of a single nave with side chapels with a barrel-vaulted roof, a citation of Alberti's Basilica of Sant'Andrea already found in Bramante's church of Santa Maria presso San Satiro. Vincenzo Seregni's first work in Milan, excluding his apprenticeship in the Fabbrica del Duomo, was instead in the reconstruction of the church of San Vittore al Corpo in a collaboration with Alessi. Alessi continued in his Counter-Reformation program with the construction of the new church of San Barnaba for the Barnabite fathers, an order that had recently been created to encourage the spread of the Tridentine doctrine: the single-nave interior layout can be considered one of the first attempts at a "basilica of the Reformation."

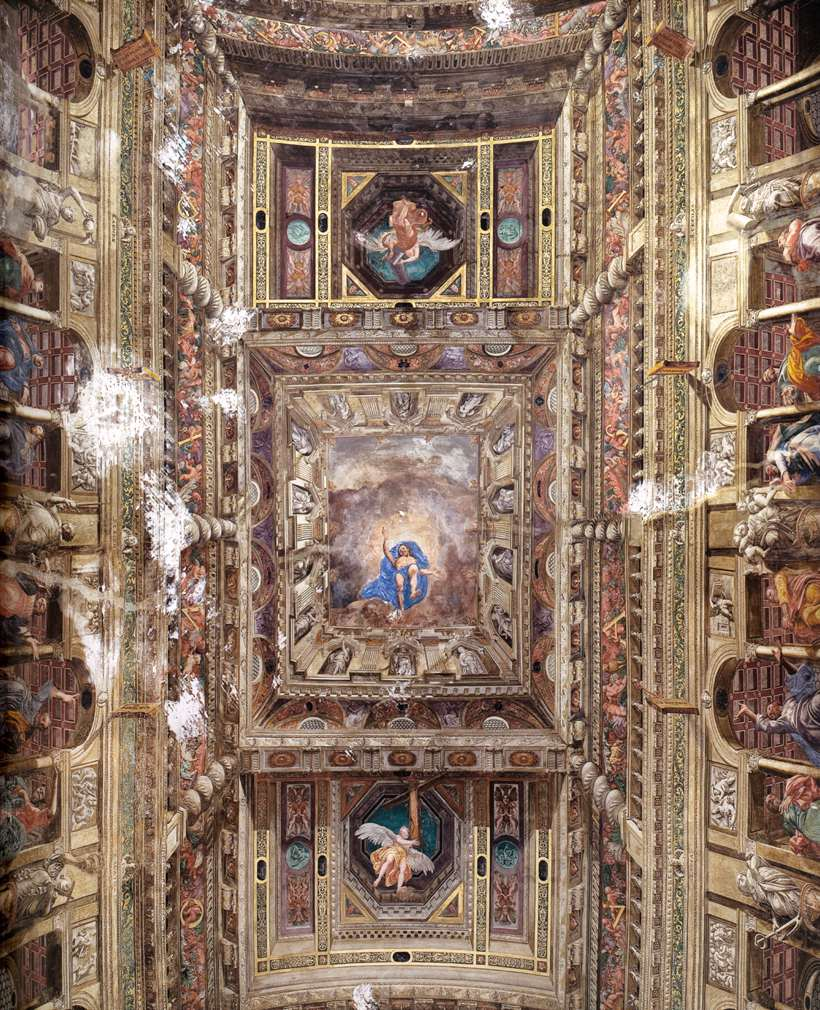
Vincenzo Campi, Ascension of Christ (1588), church of San Paolo Converso

In the Counter-Reformation agenda of Cardinal Charles Borromeo in the city of Milan, there was also the intention to bring to the city the company of Jesuits that he had gotten to know in his Roman sojourns: the cardinal placed their headquarters in the old church of San Fedele, which proved inadequate for Borromeo's propaganda, so Pellegrino Tibaldi was commissioned to construct a new building. The church of Santa Maria presso San Celso was begun in the 15th century, but much of its appearance is due to plans made from 1570 onward. Among the various renovations of old churches was that of the Garegnano Charterhouse, with the addition of the portico and the design of a new facade starting in 1573 under the direction of Vincenzo Seregni. Martino Bassi's most important works also include the reconstruction in classicist forms of the dome of the Basilica of San Lorenzo, which collapsed in 1573.

The project for the completion of the construction site of Santa Maria della Passione, involving Martino Bassi, dates back to 1576. The church of San Carlo al Lazzaretto was commissioned by Charles Borromeo in 1580 from Pellegrino Tibaldi, although in fact the work was supervised by Giuseppe Meda. Construction of the church of San Sebastiano began in 1577 as thanksgiving to the saint for the end of the plague. The church of San Raffaele, built starting in 1579, is attributable to Tibaldi, in which the decorations with sculpted herms in the lower order stand out. The church of Santa Maria al Paradiso was built on an old Franciscan convent: construction started in 1590 and was already completed in 1604. Finally, Cardinal Borromeo had a hand in bringing Milan Cathedral into line with the new Tridentine norms, thus giving a boost to the work on the building.

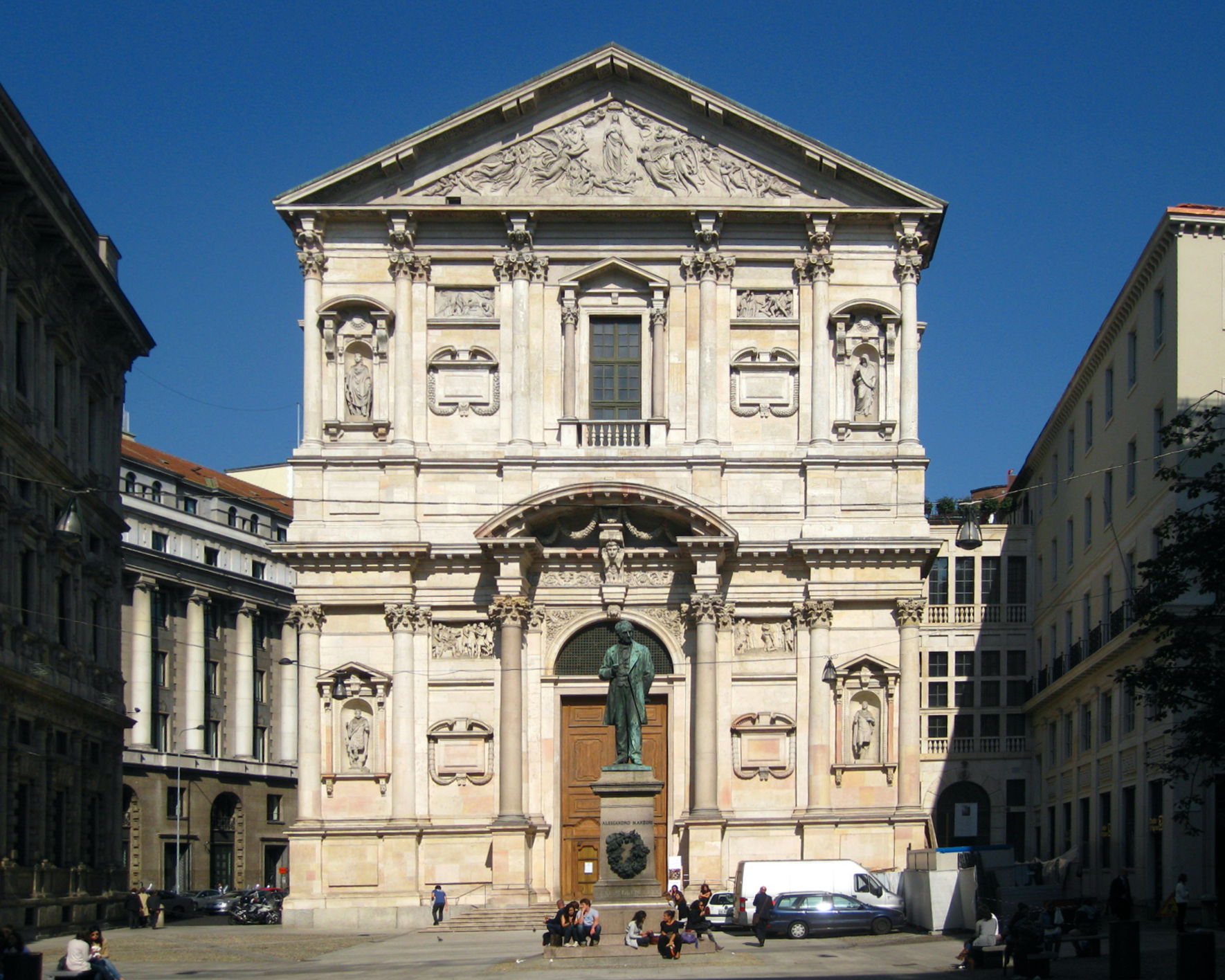
Facade of the church of San Fedele

The building site of Palazzo Marino introduced Galeazzo Alessi to Milan: it is surely the architect's most famous city work, and the palace is regarded as Milan's most representative Mannerist civil architecture. Other famous building sites of the second half of the sixteenth century in Milan include the renovation of Villa Simonetta and the constructions of Palazzo dei Giureconsulti, Casa degli Omenoni, Palazzo Arcivescovile, Palazzo Erba Odescalchi, and the rebuilding of the Palazzo Reale.

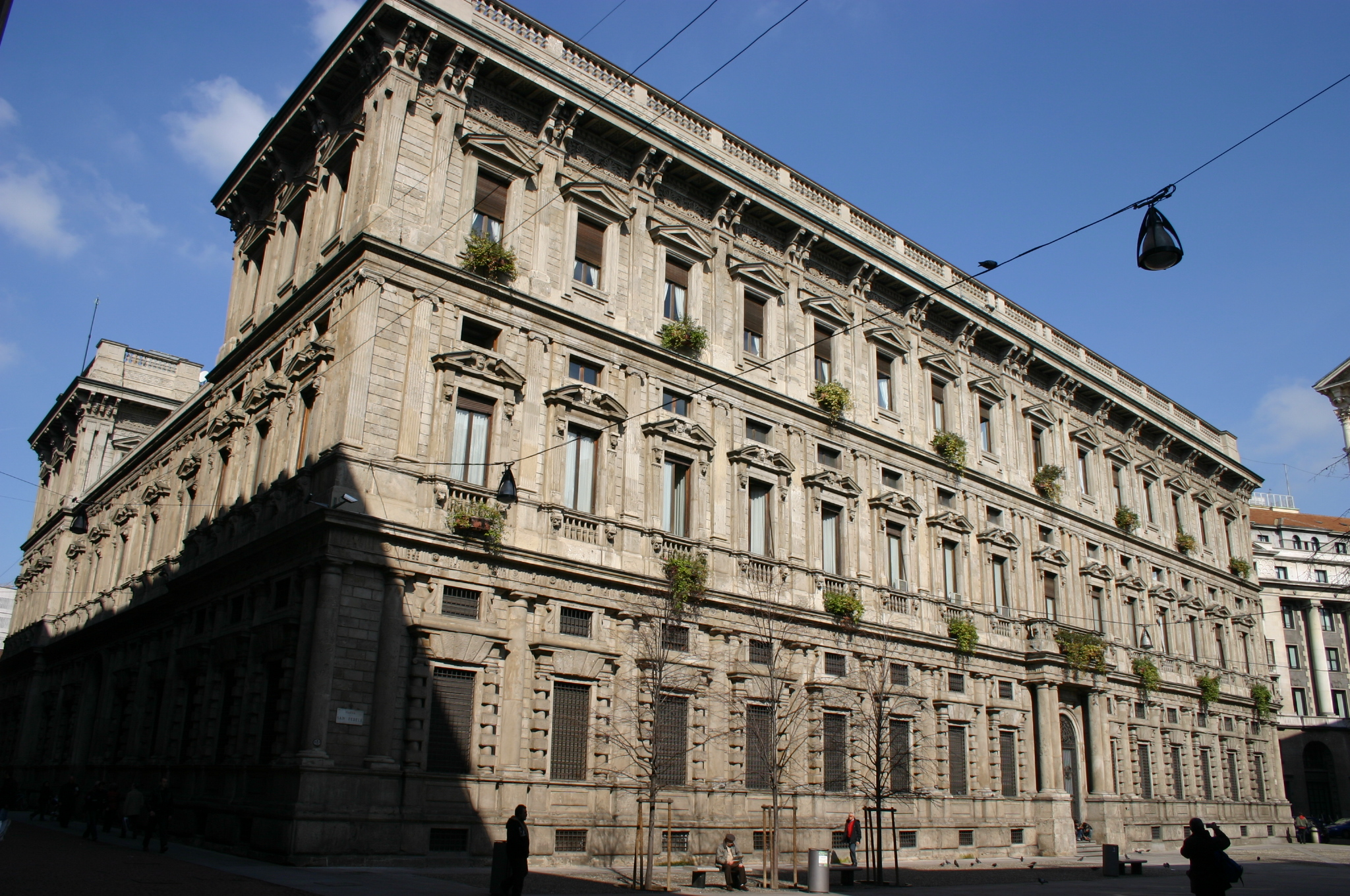
Palazzo Marino from Piazza San Fedele

Already in the early Renaissance Milanese craftsmen were among the most highly regarded in Europe, yet the heyday of the decorative arts in the city came during the early Spanish rule. One of the leading areas of Milanese craftsmanship was armor, the workmanship of which far exceeded that of other European manufactures. The fame of the Milanese armorers was such that their works were considered a real status symbol among nobles throughout Europe, despite the fact that other foreign states had established their own workshops, such as in Innsbruck, Augsburg or Greenwich; among the best craftsmen of the second half of the sixteenth century stand out above all Lucio Marliani known as the Piccinino and Giovanni Battista Panzeri known as the Zarabaglia, both belonging to well-known families of armorers.

In order to conclude the discussion of the Milanese artistic situation of the late sixteenth century, it is worth mentioning briefly a phenomenon long reputed to be marginal and underground, reevaluated only since the last decade of the twentieth century, which has made it possible to classify the experience of the "Rabisch," as the adherents of the group were also called, as a parallel phenomenon to the counter-reformed art of the time to which one can refer as "alternative classicism." The reevaluation moved the activity of the Accademia dei Facchini della Val di Blenio from a purely goliardic and recreational role to a cultural movement that, with its "anti-intellectualist attitude" and the idea of art "as free creation," anticipated themes that would be taken up centuries later in Romanticism and Scapigliatura.

=== Baroque ===
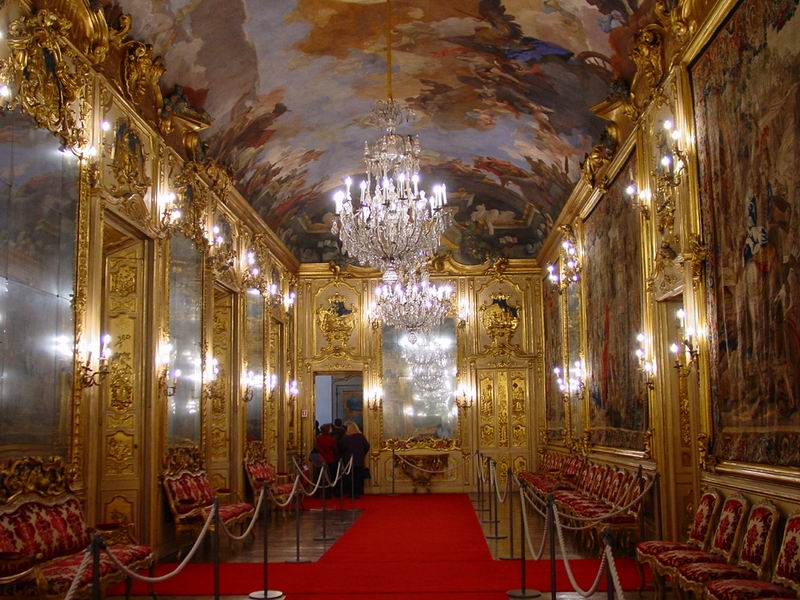
The Gallery of Tapestries with frescoes by Giambattista Tiepolo in Palazzo Clerici: one of the most significant interiors of the Milanese Baroque style.

Due to the work of the Borromeo cardinals and its importance in the Italian, at first Spanish and then Austrian dominions, in a period between the seventeenth century and the first half of the eighteenth century, Milan experienced a lively artistic period during which it assumed the role of a driving center of the Lombard Baroque, of which the Milanese Baroque (Note: Depending on the texts consulted, one finds this definition, as well as the term "Milanese Baroque." The term used, however, should not lead one to consider the artistic period as minor or to the absence of an artistic school in the city. In fact, the style that later spread homogeneously throughout Lombardy started from Milan: for this reason, the term "Lombard Baroque" is considered more correct to characterize the local art school, thus speaking of "Baroque in Milan") was the dominant movement.

The Milanese Baroque period can be divided into three parts: the early seventeenth century, the second seventeenth century, and the eighteenth century. The early seventeenth century began with the appointment of Federico Borromeo as bishop of Milan in 1595 in continuity with the work of his cousin Charles: in this first phase the main exponents of Milanese painting were three, Giovan Battista Crespi, known as Cerano, Giulio Cesare Procaccini and Pier Francesco Mazzucchelli, known as Morazzone. In this first phase, the evolution of the new Baroque style followed with continuity the late Mannerist art widespread in Milan at the time of Charles Borromeo; in fact, the training of the three painters took place on the models of late Tuscan and Roman Mannerism for Cerano and Morazzone, while Procaccini was trained on Emilian models. From the architectural point of view, religious commissions dominated the scene, since Spanish rule cared more about works of military rather than civilian utility; many pre-existing churches were completely rebuilt and decorated in Baroque style, and as many built from scratch: while the Baroque style was introduced in Milan by Lorenzo Binago, two other main architects shared the scene at the time, namely Fabio Mangone, with more classical lines and for this reason often chosen for commissions by Federico Borromeo, and Francesco Maria Richini known simply as il Richini, with lines more inspired by the early Roman Baroque. Having overcome this dualism, Richini represents the greatest figure of architect in seventeenth-century Milan, and to find again such a prestigious figure in Milanese architecture one would have to wait until the advent of Giuseppe Piermarini.

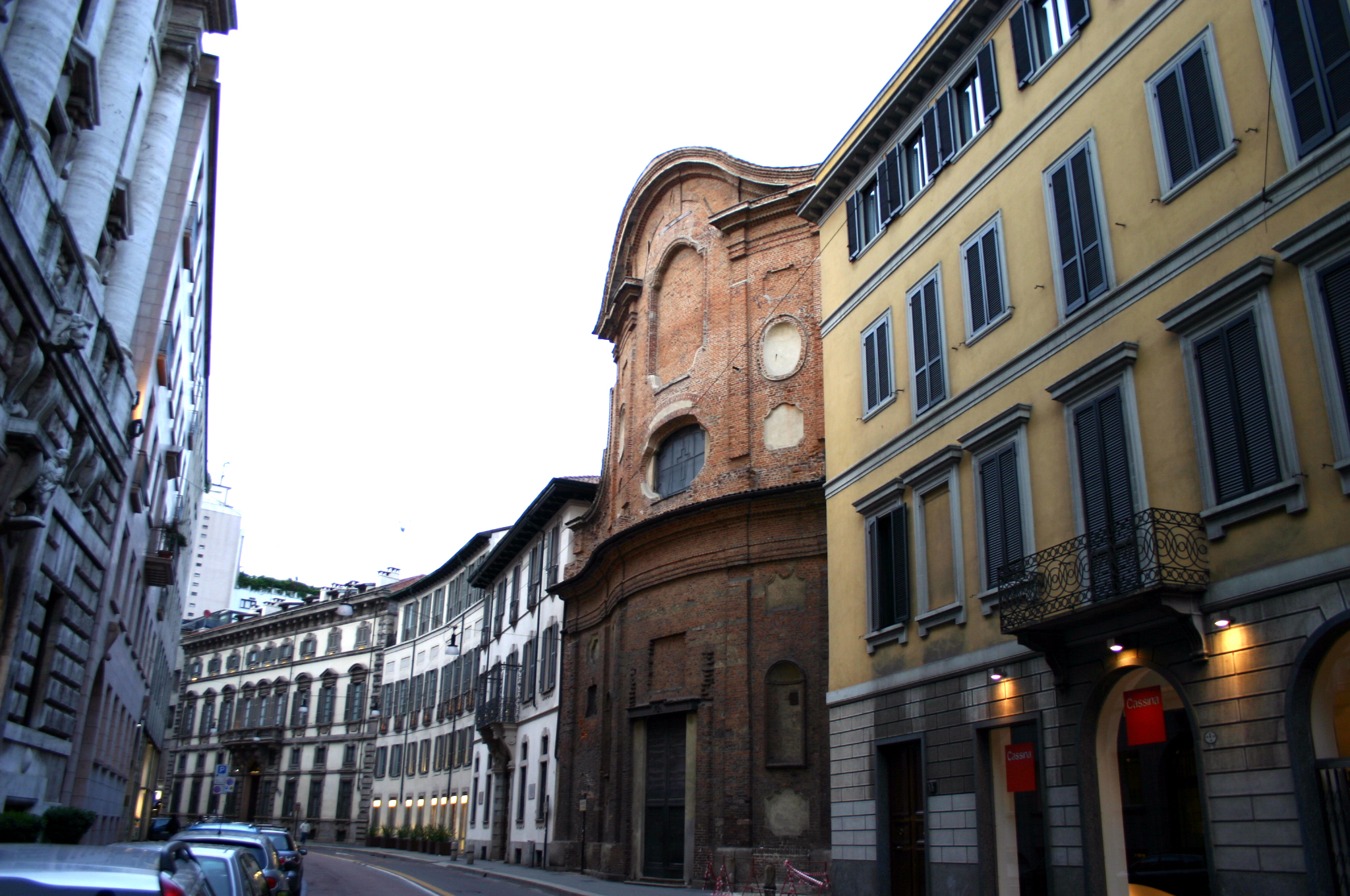
Via Durini in Milan: Palazzo Durini, Casa Toscanini and the church of Santa Maria della Sanità

The second phase of the Baroque, which begins indicatively after the early 1730s, departs after a brief interlude laden with significant events: first of all, the main interpreters of the movement died between 1625 (Giulio Cesare Procaccini) and 1632 (Cerano), to which was added the death of Cardinal Federico Borromeo, among the major figures of seventeenth-century Lombardy, and above all the great Manzonian plague, which halved the city's population, striking among the thousands of victims the promising young Milanese painter Daniele Crespi, which, among other things, led to the closure of the Accademia Ambrosiana, founded in 1621 by Federico Borromeo to train young artists for the Milanese school, in which he hired the greatest interpreters of the early Baroque, above all Cerano and Fabio Mangone, as teachers.

Painting in the second half of the seventeenth century was then completely renewed in its interpreters, with the work of the brothers Giuseppe and Carlo Francesco Nuvolone, Francesco Cairo, Giovan Battista Discepoli and others; both the by then closed Accademia Ambrosiana, which first gave some continuity in style and then reopened a few years, and the work in some of the workshops of artists from the rest of Italy from the Emilian, Genoese and Venetian schools played a key role in this. Architecture, with the passing of Fabio Magone, saw the work of Francesco Richini, who remained almost unrivaled in his Milanese production, alongside minor artists such as Gerolamo Quadrio and Carlo Buzzi. Due to the latter fact, the achievements of this period broke completely with Mannerist influences and moved closer to a distinctly Baroque style, with influences from the Emilian, Genoese, and Roman schools. The last quarter of the century saw the opening of the second Ambrosian Academy reopened in 1669 under the direction of Antonio Busca, a pupil of Carlo Francesco Nuvolone, and Dionigi Bussola, which together with the newly founded Milanese Academy of San Luca, linked to the Roman academy of the same name, contributed to the return of a classicist trend linked to the Bolognese and Roman schools.

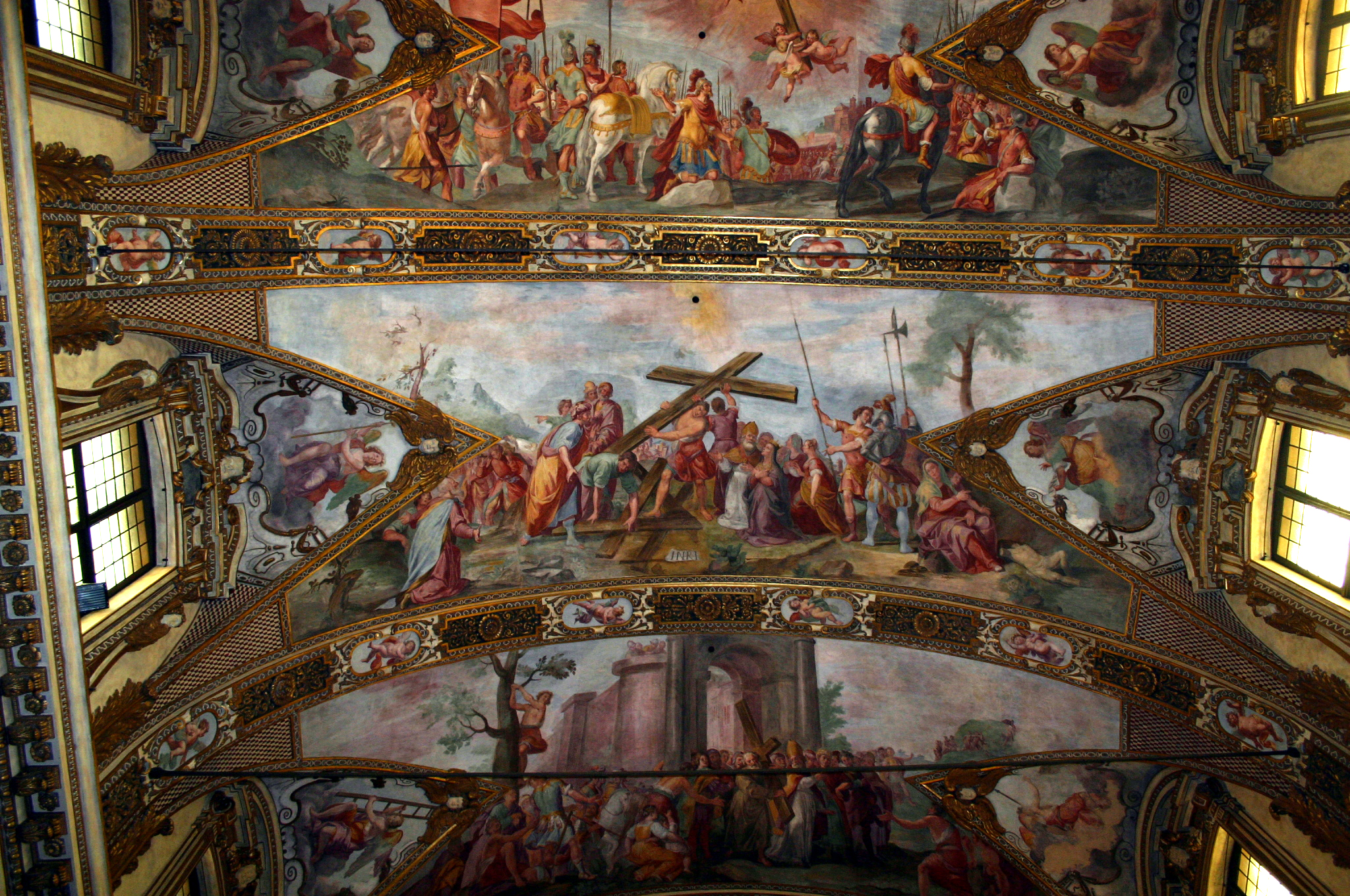
Carlone frescoes in Sant'Antonio Abate

The eighteenth century represents the last Baroque phase; the style did not blossom overtly into Rococo due to the normative action of the Milanese College of Engineers-Architects (Note: As indeed it did not blossom into Rococo in much of Lombardy, see Terraroli (2004, p. 342)) and there was a change of trend: religious commissions no longer played the main role in the Milanese artistic scene, but gave way to the ville di delizia of the Milanese countryside (Note: Such ville di delizia were made famous among others by the engravings of Marcantonio Dal Re.) and the return of the great private city building sites: the liveliness of the building sites led to a greater number of fine performers, including Giovanni Battista Quadrio, Carlo Federico Pietrasanta, Bartolomeo Bolla, Carlo Giuseppe Merlo and Francesco Croce, who were joined by the Roman Giovanni Ruggeri, who was very active throughout Lombardy. In painting, the works of Giambattista Tiepolo for "history painting" and Alessandro Magnasco for genre painting, both of whom were not from Lombardy, stand out: this phase marked a change in the preferences of patrons, who preferred artists from the non-Lombard school, above all the Venetian school, which was considered more prestigious at the time. The late eighteenth century witnessed a period in which the lines of the Baroque were tempered by the looming neoclassicism, until the Milanese Baroque period came to a close with the painter Francesco Londonio, at whose death in 1783 the city of Milan was already in the midst of the Age of Enlightenment, in the midst of the Neoclassical period.

=== Neoclassicism ===
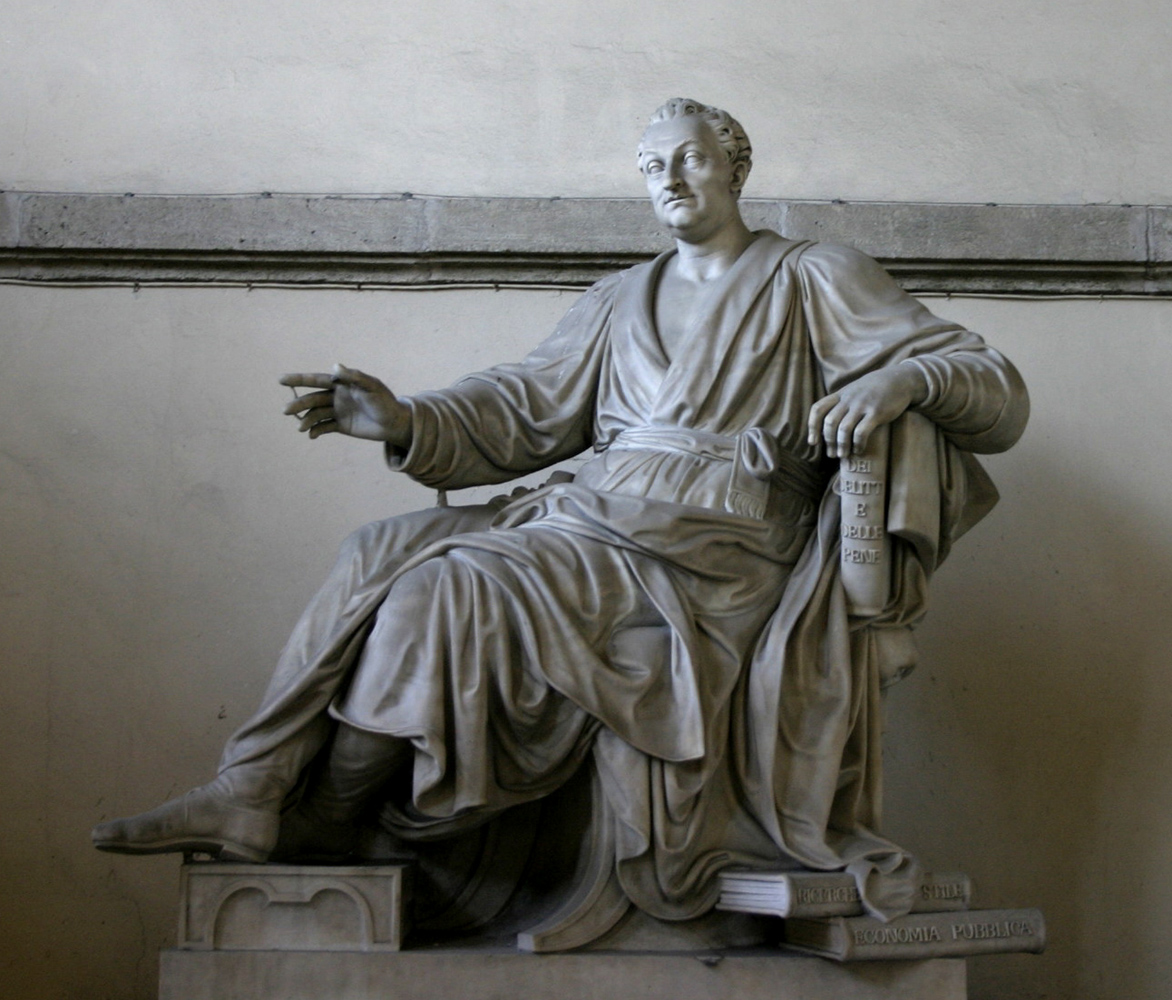
Pompeo Marchesi, Monument to Cesare Beccaria, Brera Academy.

Also noteworthy was Milan's neoclassical period, which was among the most important in Italy and Europe. It lasted from the end of the reign of Maria Theresa of Austria, and continued throughout the subsequent Napoleonic Kingdom of Italy and during the Conservative Order: in this period Milan was the protagonist of a strong cultural and economic revival, in which Neoclassicism was the dominant artistic style and major expression. (Note: In 1809, Leopoldo Cicognara, director of the Academy of Fine Arts in Venice, wrote: "...Milan is so superior in artists and production that, without extraordinary means, it will never be equaled by any city in the kingdom")

In the early 18th century Milan passed from Spanish to Austrian rule, following the Treaty of Rastatt in 1714. Under the reigns of Maria Theresa of Austria (1740-1780) and Joseph II of Austria (1765-1790), the city was the protagonist of a strong economic and cultural renaissance: the empress and her son, strongly influenced by Enlightenment theories, carried out considerable reforms. Partly as a result of the Enlightenment government and reforms, Milan proved to be open to innovations from Europe, and it quickly became a lively intellectual center. For this reason, too, it was later the main center of the Italian Enlightenment: the city featured the most famous interpreters of the movement, such as the brothers Alessandro and Pietro Verri and Cesare Beccaria, and was home to Il Caffè and the Accademia dei Pugni, as well as the Accademia dei Trasformati. Reforms affected vast areas of the city's public order: as part of the implementation of the tax reorganization, the city was provided with one of the most modern and effective land registries in Europe, known today as the Teresian Cadastre. (Note: In this regard, historian Sergio Zaninelli describes the Milan cadastre at the time as "a fundamental element of Lombard agricultural progress in the 18th and 19th centuries, and celebrated for its technical perfection". See Sergio Zaninelli (1963). Il nuovo censo dello stato di Milano dall'editto del 1718 al 1733. Milano: Vita e pensiero. pp. 9–10.)

Between 1765 and 1785 Joseph II implemented the suppression of a number of religious orders; the inquisition was abolished, congregations of religious orders, including the Jesuit order, were suppressed and their property confiscated, becoming the property of the city, which, having vast areas at its disposal, was able to implement an unprecedented urban rearrangement (Note: In this regard Aldo Rossi writes that the city had the opportunity "to dispose of vast urbanized areas, to arrange the roads (...), to build schools, academies, gardens; precisely on the gardens of two convents of nuns and on that of the senate the public gardens were established." See Aldo Rossi (1978). L'architettura della città. Milano: Clup. p. 200.) organized by court architect Giuseppe Piermarini, who made Neoclassicism the style of the city's rebirth. The first public gardens were opened and elegant palaces, inspired by the new artistic movement, were built, appropriately selecting the target areas. Some of Milan's most famous institutions, such as the Teatro alla Scala, the Brera cultural center and the reformed Scuole Palatine, were created during this period.

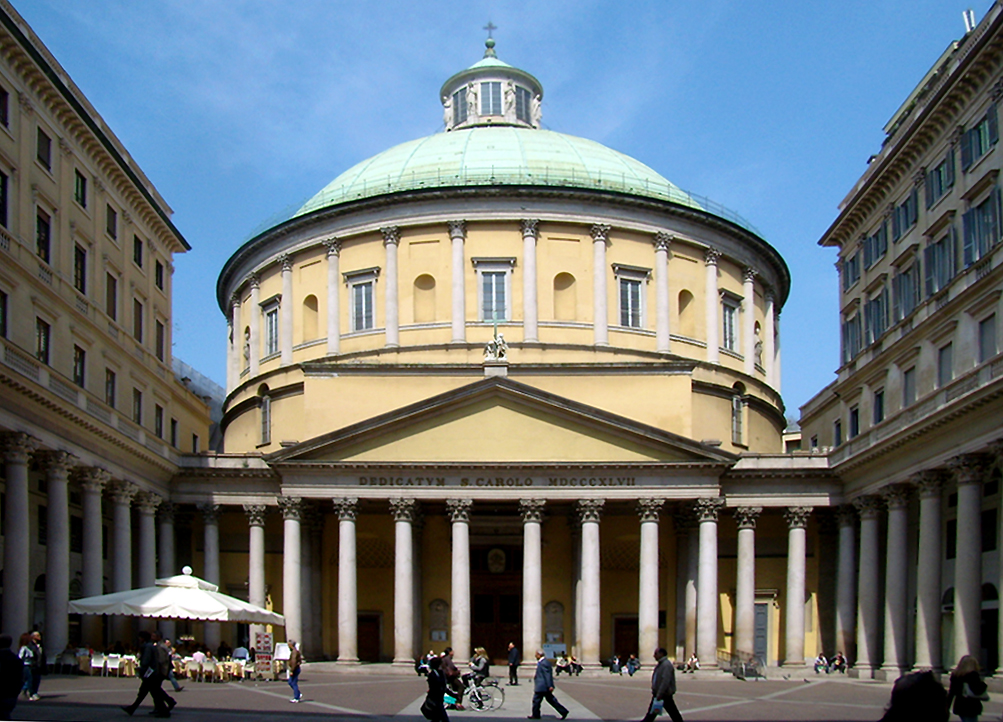
Small square of the church of San Carlo al Corso

In 1796 with Napoleon's arrival in Italy, Archduke Ferdinand of Austria abandoned the city, which from 1800 passed into French hands. French domination did not stop Milan's exceptional cultural activity; the population was growing rapidly and some of Italy's greatest intellectuals met in the city: from Melchiorre Gioia to Vincenzo Monti, from Alessandro Volta to Ugo Foscolo and Silvio Pellico; the Lombard Institute of Science and Letters was also inaugurated and numerous newspapers were founded in the city.

As the capital of the Kingdom of Italy, numerous urban plans were drawn up for Milan with the aim of giving it the appearance of a European capital, but these did not find full implementation. For some time the population had been petitioning for the demolition of the Castello Sforzesco, and by decree of June 23, 1800 Napoleon ordered its demolition. It was partially carried out starting in 1801; in that same year Antolini was commissioned to build the Foro Bonaparte, and the architect proposed to remodel the castle in neoclassical forms, but due to the excessive cost of implementation the project was shelved. (Note: However, Antolini's idea remained a purely formal one. See Aldo Rossi (1978). L'architettura della città. Milano: Clup. p. 200.)

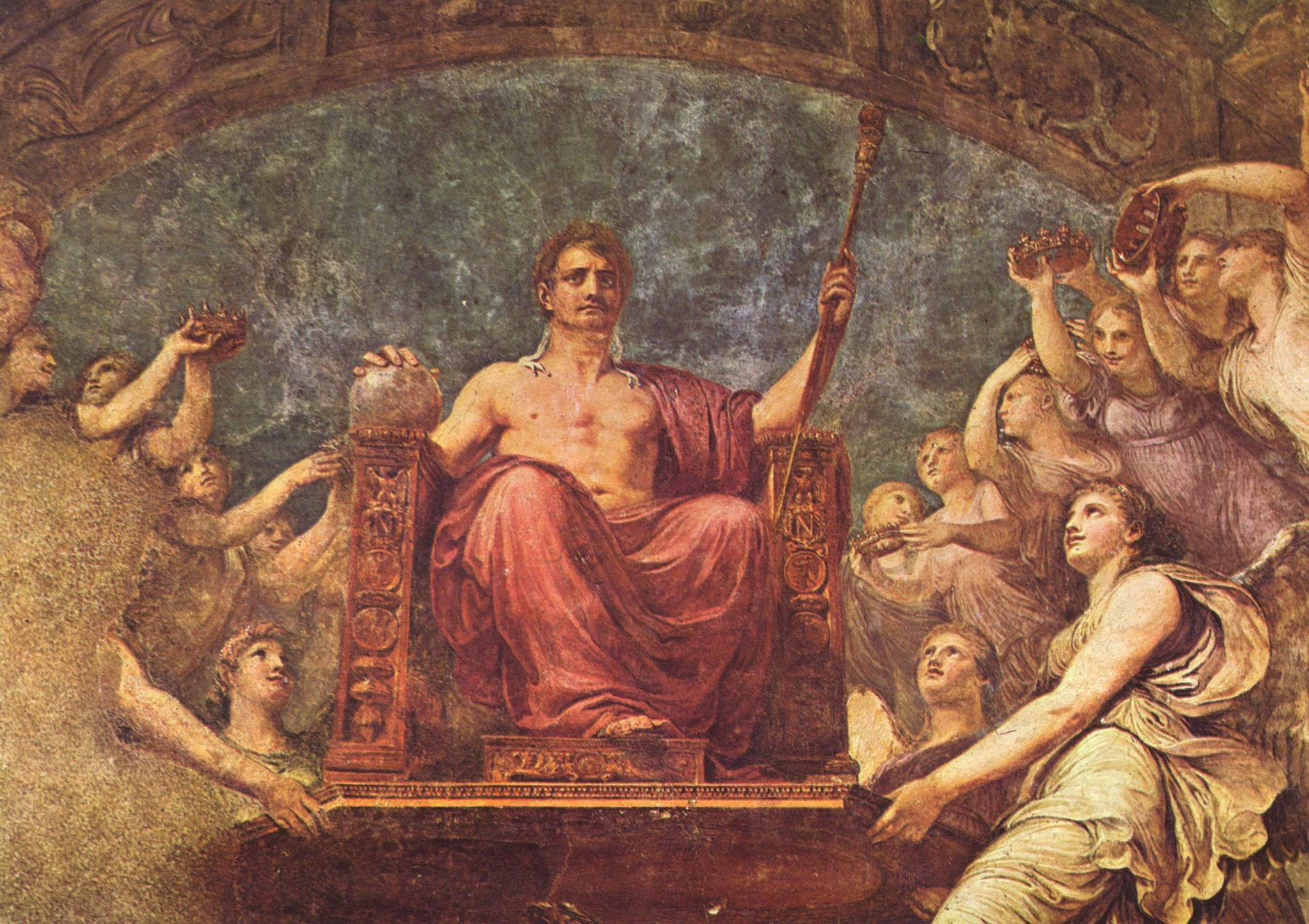
Andrea Appiani - Apotheosis of Napoleon, Royal Palace of Milan.

In 1807 by decree the municipalities of Milan and Venice were endowed with a Commission of Ornamentation with vast powers and wide sphere of action. The Commission was composed of the most influential personalities present in Milan, among them Cagnola and Canonica. The first topic addressed was the Master Plan, drafted in the same year. Until 1814 the city's development was regulated by that plan, which "can be considered one of the most modern plans created in Europe."

With the return of the Austrians, the city completed its cultural and economic establishment. Trade and finance activities made Milan Italy's main economic hub, (Note: It should be remembered that Milan at the time had the great advantage of being the only major Italian city incorporated into a modern state. See Dalmasso (1972, p. 137)) while agriculture in the Milanese area, thanks in part to the government's completion of many water works, was among the most developed and modern in Europe: at the same time, the city became Italy's major publishing and cultural center, with the work of figures such as Carlo Cattaneo, Cesare Cantù and Carlo Tenca. Milan has neoclassical buildings and monuments that were the result of private and public commissions: primarily this is due to the strong link present between the Enlightenment and neoclassical art, especially in architecture of a public nature, and secondly to the role that neoclassical architecture played in the celebration of Napoleon's revolutions and deeds. These periods inevitably came to an end with the Conservative Order: Neoclassicism began a slow decline, and was eventually replaced by the Romantic and eclectic style, nevertheless leaving an important legacy. In that flourishing period, the foundations were laid that would later allow Milan to establish itself as the economic, and at certain times even cultural, capital of united Italy.

=== Art Nouveau ===
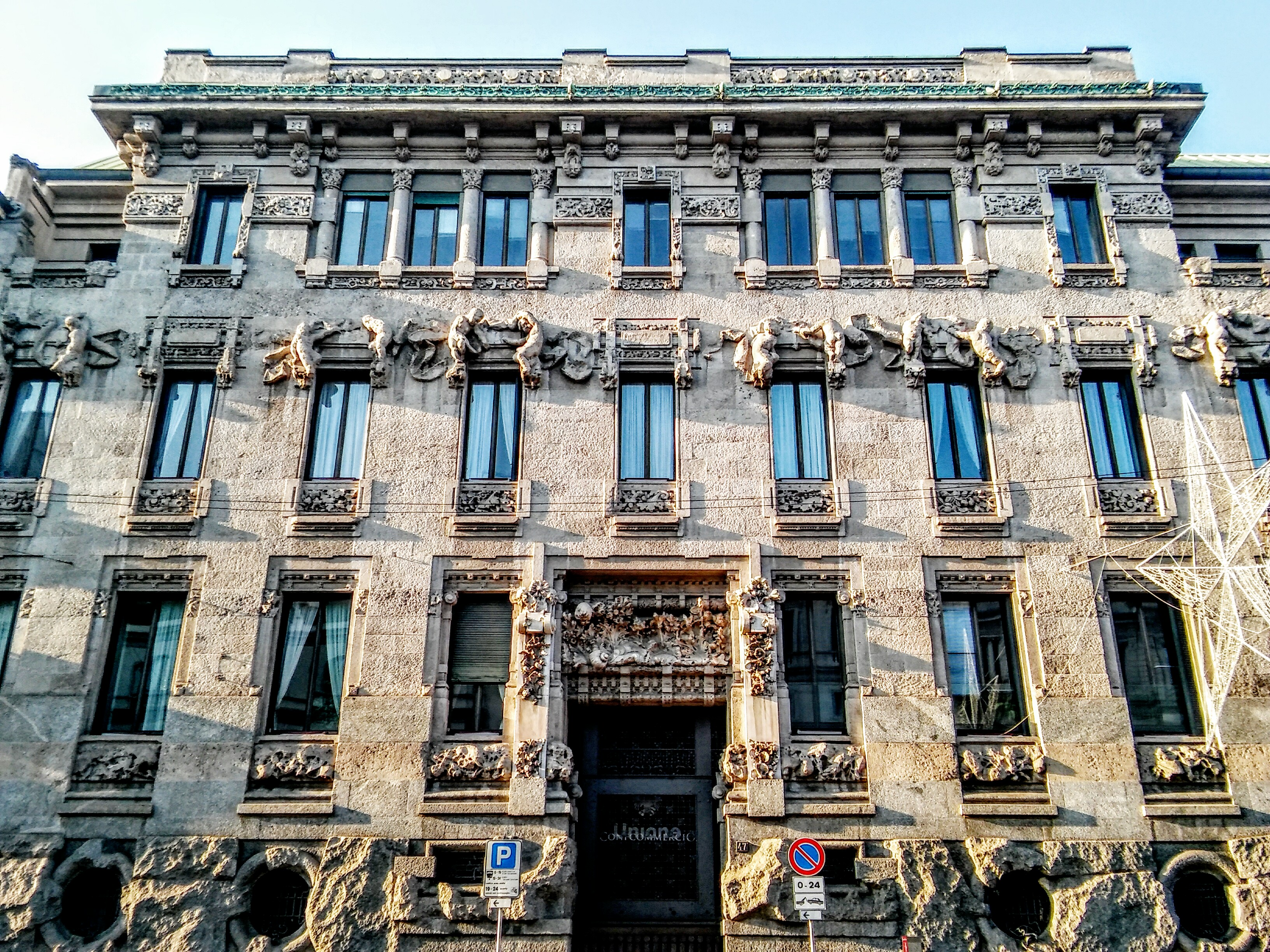
Palazzo Castiglioni, an important example of Milanese Art Nouveau.

Also important for art history was the Milanese Art Nouveau, that is, the period of the aforementioned style that spread in Milan between the early 20th century and the outbreak of World War I. In the Lombard capital, the Art Nouveau style found, due to its close connection with the rampant industrial bourgeoisie of the time, fertile ground for rapid development that saw it range from the influences of French floral art nouveau to German Jugendstil and eclecticism.

With the 1881 National Exhibition, twenty years after the unification of the nation, the city of Milan was definitively established as Italy's main industrial hub. The city saw the formation of a new emerging bourgeois class linked to industry and commerce and made up of master builders, landowners and entrepreneurs who in a few decades would stand alongside the city's old nobility in affluence and importance.

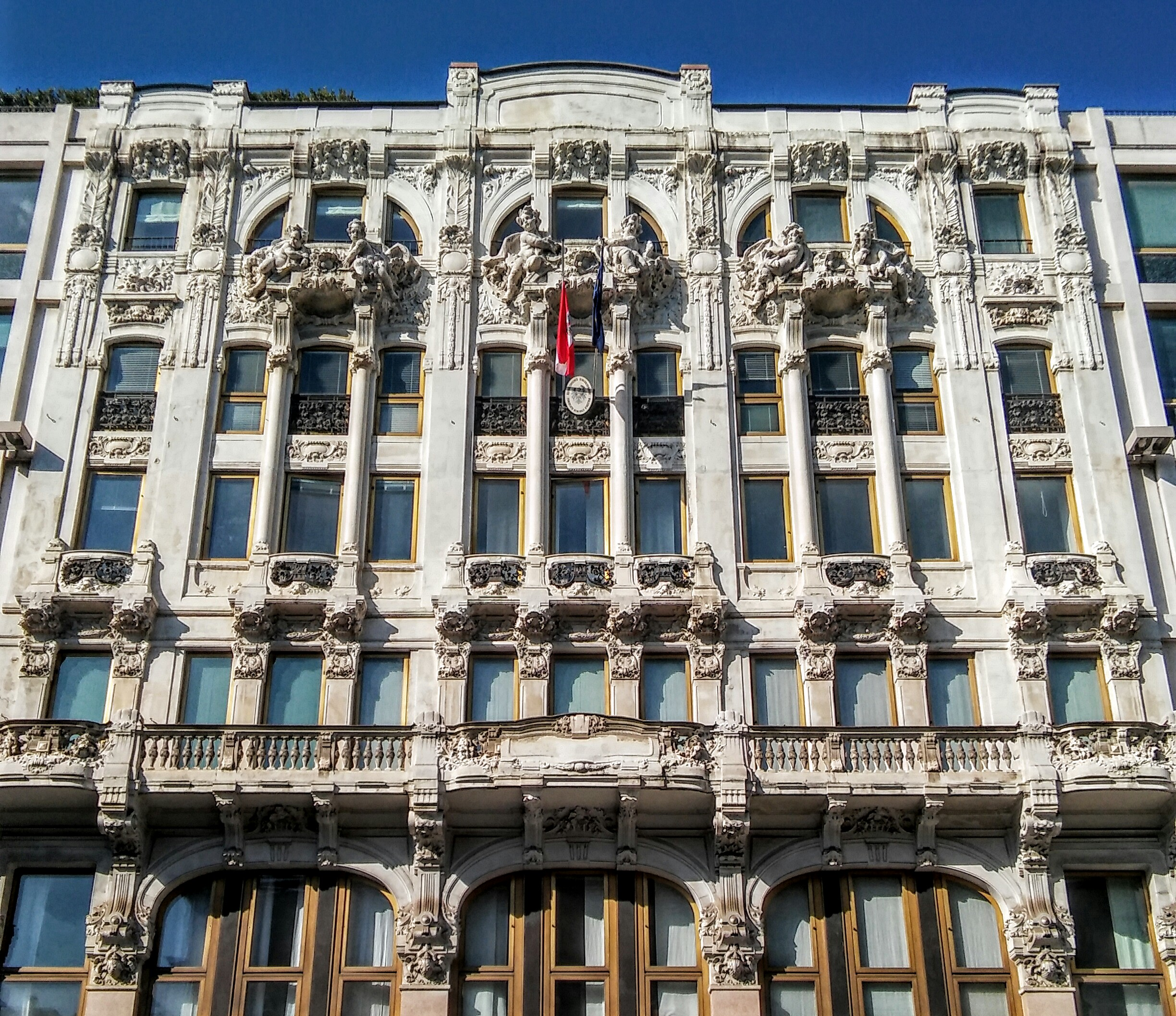
Decoration of the former Hotel Trianon

At the beginning of the 20th century, therefore, the bourgeois class, which by then had become the ruler of the social and economic life of the city, found in the Art Nouveau style, a novelty coming from France and introduced in Italy in the Turin Exposition of 1902, its own specific status symbol and an opportunity to show its power and at the same time emphasize its clear detachment from the aristocratic class and its neoclassical and baroque mansions: this almost exclusive link between the new ruling class and the new architectural style and the clear detachment from the architectural models of the "old" aristocratic class appear most evident when one observes that, while the new bourgeoisie erected mansions à la page following the new dictates of Art Nouveau, at the same time the traditional and more conservative patronage associated with the old financial and ecclesiastical world - the new bank offices in the Piazza Cordusio area stand out above them all - remained tied instead to the now decadent and more conservative eclectic style in vogue in the nineteenth century.

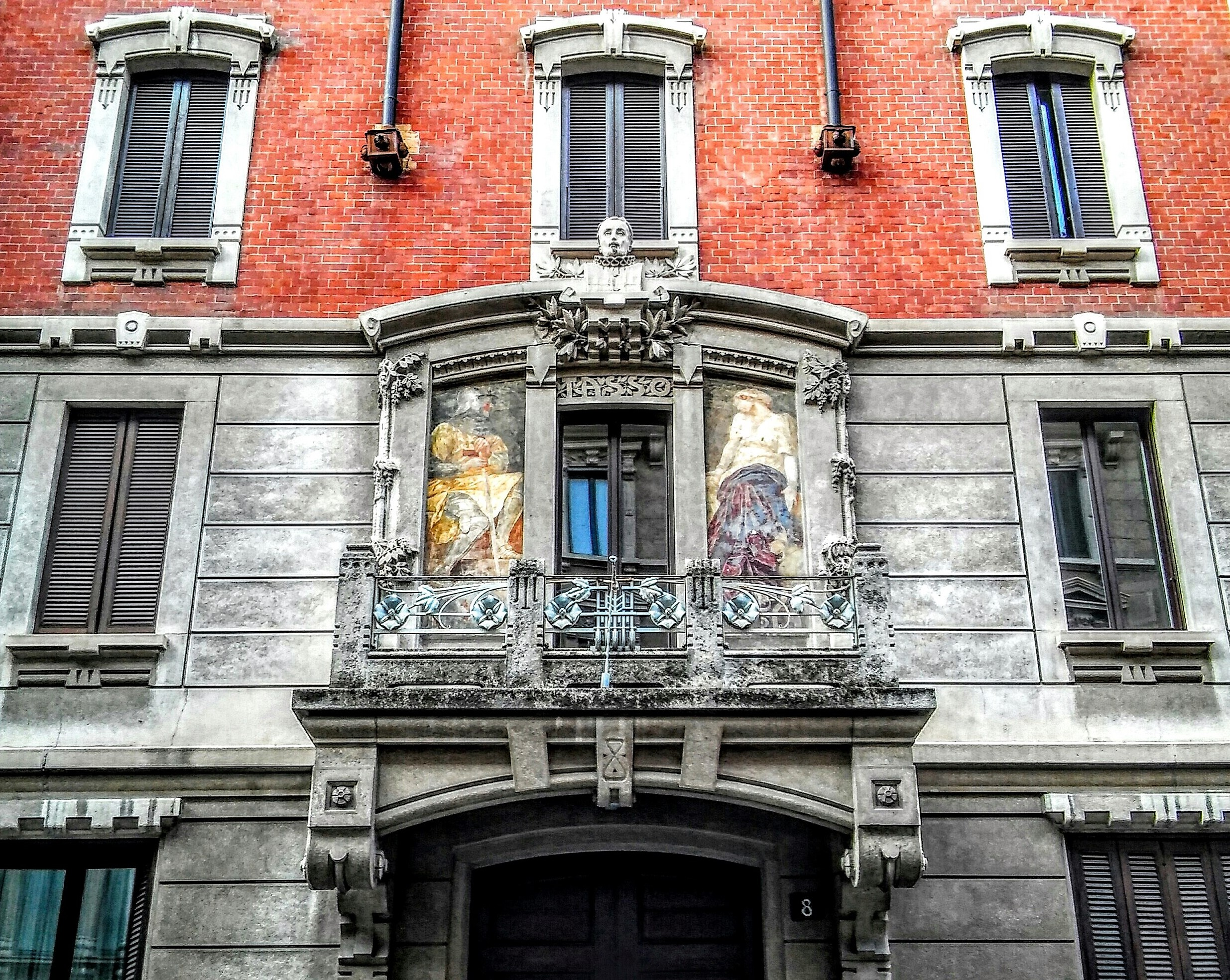
Detail of Casa Donzelli

Giving further impetus to the development of Art Nouveau was the 1906 Milan International Exposition, which saw dozens of pavilions spring up in the style on the exhibition grounds as well as public and private buildings that the exposition helped to erect, thus decreeing the definitive consecration of Art Nouveau as the dominant artistic style. Although highly articulated and differentiated, the Milanese Art Nouveau style shows as a whole some common points and innovations: recurring is the decoration of the building, in wrought iron or decorative concrete, with a theme of flowers or the animal world; at the structural level, the use of reinforced concrete is notable. Common, on the other hand, is the use of painting on the walls of buildings, often with ceramic tiles, and of caryatids and herms borrowed from the architecture of Milan's noble palaces. In contrast, despite a very rich sampling of Art Nouveau applied arts developed in the city, architecture and interior decoration struggled to conform to the new style and except for rare episodes were still dominated by late eclectic stylistic features.

Reaching its apex in 1906, Milanese Art Nouveau saw its first influences with eclectic architecture, which became increasingly strong until the years of World War I, after which Art Nouveau survived only in minor influences in minor buildings, while the trend of the industrial bourgeoisie spontaneously flowed toward Art Deco.

=== Art movements of the 20th century ===
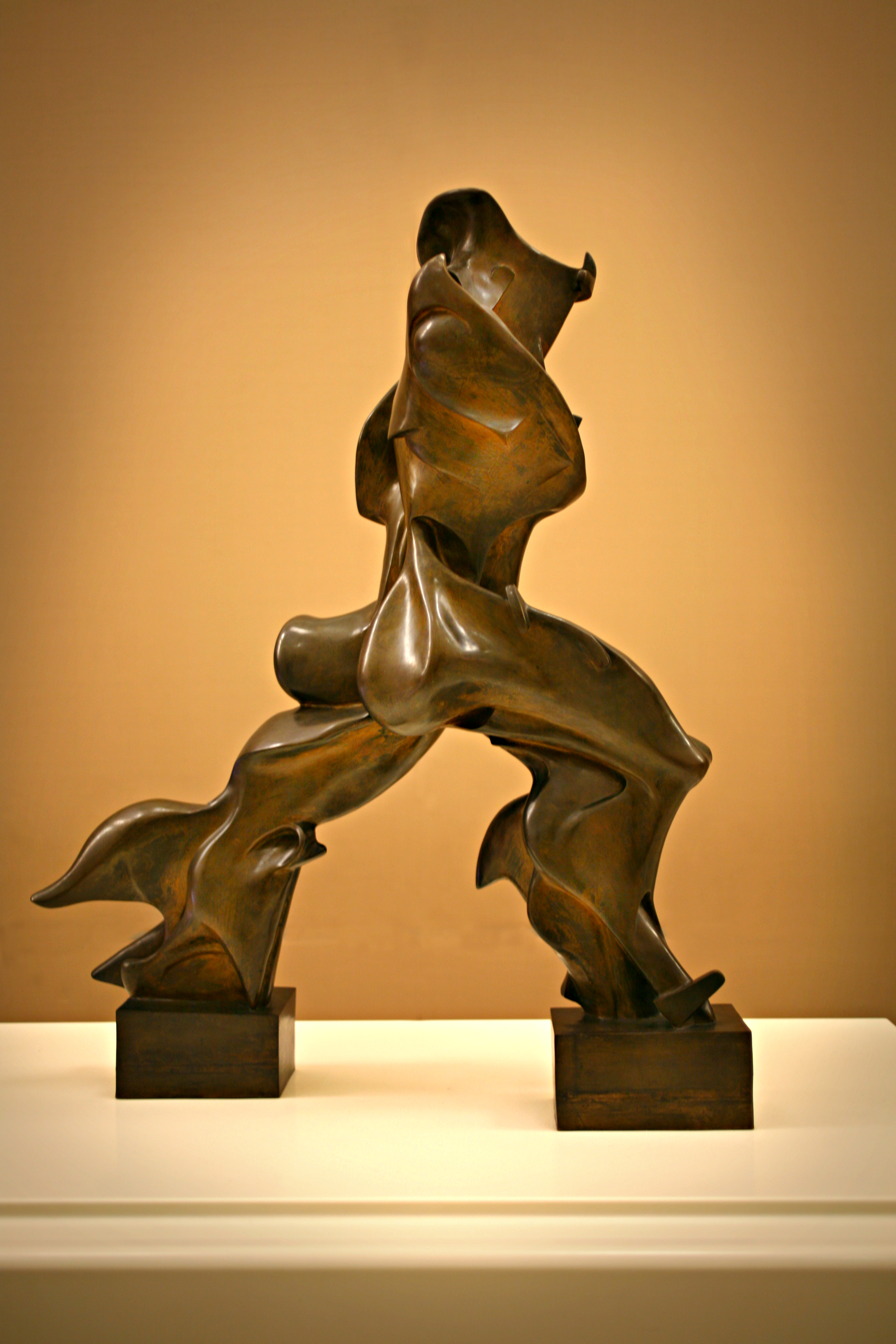
Umberto Boccioni, Unique Forms of Continuity in Space, 1949 model exhibited at the Museo del Novecento in Milan

Milan was the cradle of a number of modern art movements. In February 1910, painters Umberto Boccioni, Carlo Carrà, Giacomo Balla, Gino Severini and Luigi Russolo signed the Manifesto of Futurist Painters in Milan and the Technical Manifesto of Futurist Painting in April of the same year, which contributed, along with other manifestos signed in other Italian cities, to found the artistic movement of Futurism, which was the first European avant-garde.

It had influence on related movements that developed in other countries in Europe (especially Russia and France), the United States of America and Asia. The Futurists explored every form of expression, from painting to sculpture, literature (poetry and theater), music, architecture, dance, photography, film, and even gastronomy. The movement's official name is due to Italian poet Filippo Tommaso Marinetti.

Milan was also the birthplace of the artistic movement called Novecento, which was born in the city at the end of 1922 by Mario Sironi, Achille Funi, Leonardo Dudreville, Anselmo Bucci, Emilio Malerba, Pietro Marussig, and Ubaldo Oppi who, at the Pesaro Gallery in Milan, joined together in the new movement named Novecento by Bucci.

These artists, who felt themselves to be translators of the spirit of the Novecento, came from different backgrounds and artistic movements, but were linked by a common sense of a "return to order" in art after the avant-garde endeavors especially of Futurism: the Novecento thus returned to classical antiquity, purity of form and harmony in composition as its supreme reference. In this sense it also adopted the designation of Simplified Neoclassicism. The Novecento movement also manifested itself in literature with Massimo Bontempelli and especially in architecture with the architects Giovanni Muzio, Giò Ponti, Paolo Mezzanotte and others.

== Major works ==
| Work | Description | Year of completion | Image |
|---|---|---|---|
| Basilica of Sant'Ambrogio | Basilica of Sant'Ambrogio The basilica of Sant'Ambrogio (basilega de Sant Ambroeus in Milanese dialect), whose full name is basilica romana minore collegiata abbaziale prepositurale di Sant'Ambrogio (its original early Christian name was basilica martyrum), is one of the oldest churches in Milan and is located in Piazza Sant'Ambrogio. It represents to this day not only a monument of the early Christian and medieval period, but also a fundamental point in the history of Milan and the Ambrosian Church. It is traditionally considered the second most important church in the city of Milan. | 386 | |
| Milan Cathedral | The Metropolitan Cathedral Basilica of the Nativity of the Blessed Virgin Mary, better known as the Milan Cathedral (Dòmm de Milan in Milanese dialect), is the cathedral of the Archdiocese of Milan. A symbol of the Lombard capital, and located in the square of the same name in the center of the metropolis, it is dedicated to Saint Mary of the Nativity. It is the largest church in Italy, the fourth largest in the world by area, and the sixth largest by volume. It is the seat of the parish of Santa Tecla in Milan Cathedral. | 1418 | |
| Castello Sforzesco | The Castello Sforzesco (Castell Sforzesch in Milanese dialect) is a fortification that stands in Milan just outside the city's historic center. It was erected in the 15th century by Francesco Sforza, who had recently become Duke of Milan, on the remains of an earlier medieval fortification dating back to the 14th century known as Castello di Porta Giovia (or Zobia). In the same area where Porta Giovia Castle stood, in Roman times, there was the Castrum Portae Jovis of the same name, one of the four defensive castles of Roman Milan. Considerably transformed and modified over the centuries, Castello Sforzesco was, between the 16th and 17th centuries, one of Europe's leading military citadels; restored in historicist style by Luca Beltrami between 1890 and 1905, it is now home to cultural institutions and important museums. It is one of the largest castles in Europe as well as one of the main symbols of Milan and its history. | 1360 | |
| Church of Santa Maria presso San Satiro | The church of Santa Maria presso San Satiro is a parish church in Milan. The construction of the church was undertaken at the end of the 15th century at the behest of Duke Gian Galeazzo Sforza and later continued by Ludovico il Moro as part of an ambitious program of renewal of the arts in the duchy, which included calling artists from all over Italy to the Milanese court: in fact, the building was designed according to new Renaissance forms imported into the duchy by Donato Bramante. The church, built by incorporating the older sacellum of San Satiro from which it took its name, is famous for housing the so-called Bramante faux choir, a masterpiece of Italian Renaissance perspective painting. | 1483 | |
| Church of Santa Maria delle Grazie | The church of Santa Maria delle Grazie is a basilica and sanctuary located in Milan, belonging to the Dominican Order and forming part of the parish of San Vittore al Corpo. The architecture of the tribune, built between 1492 and 1493 at the behest of the Duke of Milan Ludovico il Moro as a mausoleum for his family, constitutes one of the highest achievements of the Renaissance in northern Italy. It was the second Italian site after the rock drawings in Valcamonica to be classified as a UNESCO World Heritage Site, along with Leonardo da Vinci's Last Supper fresco located in the refectory of the convent (owned by the City of Milan). | 1497 | |
| The Last Supper | The Last Supper is a wall painting created with a mixed technique using dry paint on plaster (460×880 cm) by Leonardo da Vinci, dated 1495-1498 and preserved in the former Renaissance refectory of the convent adjacent to the sanctuary of Santa Maria delle Grazie in Milan. It is the most famous depiction of the Last Supper, a masterpiece of Leonardo and the Italian Renaissance in general. Despite this, the work - due to the unique experimental technique used by Leonardo that was incompatible with the humidity of the environment - has been in a poor state of preservation for centuries, which was improved as much as possible during one of the longest restorations in history, lasting from 1978 to 1999 using the most advanced techniques in the field. In 2014 it was the 13th most visited Italian state site. | 1498 | |
| Church of San Fedele | The Church of San Fedele (Gesa de San Fedee in Milanese dialect) is a Catholic church in Milan, built in the 16th century by order of St. Charles Borromeo to house the Society of Jesus. Because of the structure's adherence to St. Charles Borromeo's Instructiones, as well as the wide range of quotations from famous architectural models of the past and the many later churches that drew from the church, San Fedele is considered the model for sacred architecture in Counter-Reformation art. | 1579 | |
| Teatro alla Scala | The Teatro alla Scala, often informally referred to as "la Scala," is Milan's main opera house. Regarded as one of the most prestigious theaters in the world, it has for 246 years been home to leading artists in the international field of opera, and, more generally, classical music, often commissioning works that are still on the billboards of major theaters around the world. The theater was inaugurated on August 3, 1778 with Europa riconosciuta, composed for the occasion by Antonio Salieri, and took its name from the church of Santa Maria alla Scala, which was demolished to make way for the Nuovo Regio Ducal Teatro alla Scala. Since the year of its founding, it has been home to the choir of the same name, the orchestra, the ballet company, and since 1982 also to the Philharmonic. The theater complex is located in the square of the same name, next to the Casino Ricordi, now home to the Museo teatrale alla Scala. | 1778 | |
| Galleria Vittorio Emanuele II | Galleria Vittorio Emanuele II is a commercial gallery in Milan that, in the form of a covered pedestrian street, connects Piazza Duomo to Piazza della Scala. Due to the presence of elegant stores and bars, since its inauguration it was a meeting place for the Milanese bourgeoisie, so much so that it was nicknamed the "living room of Milan." Built in the Neo-Renaissance style, it is among the most celebrated examples of European cast-iron architecture and represents the archetype of the nineteenth-century shopping gallery. Called simply "the Galleria" by the Milanese, it is often regarded as one of the earliest examples of a shopping center in the world. | 1867 | |

== Most prominent artists ==
Among the most prominent artist are the following:

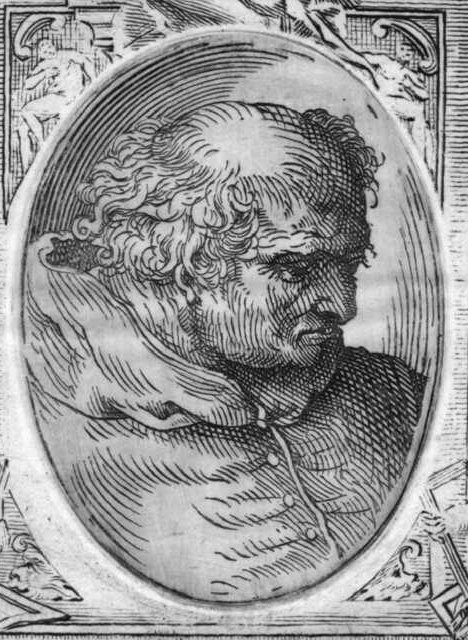
Donato Bramante

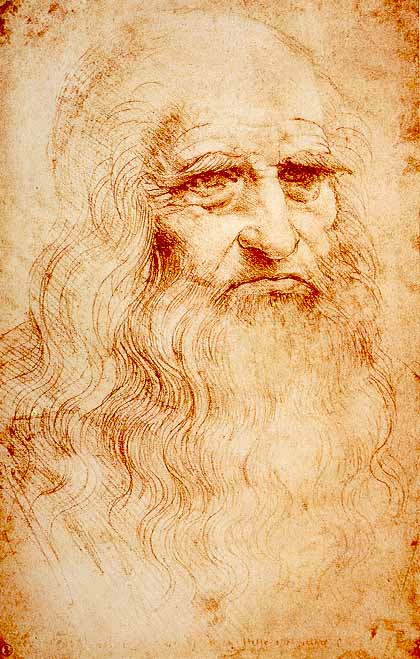
Leonardo da Vinci

=== Architects ===
- Filarete
- Donato Bramante
- Pellegrino Tibaldi
- Francesco Maria Richini
- Giuseppe Piermarini

=== Painters ===
- Michelino da Besozzo
- Vincenzo Foppa
- Leonardo da Vinci
- Bernardino Luini
- Gaudenzio Ferrari
- Caravaggio
- Il Cerano
- Andrea Appiani
- Francesco Hayez

=== Sculptors ===
- Giovanni di Balduccio
- Giovanni Antonio Amadeo
- Agostino Busti
- Giuseppe Rusnati
- Medardo Rosso

=== Schools and movements ===
- Comacine masters
- Leonardeschi

== See also ==
- Villas and palaces in Milan

== Bibliography ==
- Autori vari (2003). Touring Club Italiano:Guida d'Italia - Milano (Guide rosse d'Italia ed.). Milano: Touring Club Editore.
- Autori vari (2006). La storia dell'arte. Vol. Il tardo Cinquecento (vol. 10). Milano: Electa.
- Maria Grazia Balzarini (2000). Il Gotico. Milano: Nodo Libri.
- Bardeschi, Marco Dezzi; Bucci, Federico; Dulio, Roberto (2006). Milano: architettura, città, paesaggio. Roma: Mancosu.
- Rossana Bossaglia, Valerio Terraioli (2003). Il liberty a Milano. Milano: Skira editore.
- Cesare Brandi (2013). Disegno dell'architettura italiana. Roma: Castelvecchi.
- Adele Buratti Mazzotta, ed. (1992). Insula Ansperti: il complesso monumentale di San Satiro. Milano: Amilcare Pizzi.
- Simonetta Coppa, Federica Bianchi (2009). Lombardia barocca. Milano: Jaca Book.
- Etienne Dalmasso (1972). Milano Capitale economica d'Italia. Milano: Franco Angeli Editore.
- Giovanni Denti (1988). Architettura a Milano tra controriforma e barocco. Firenze: Alinea.
- Stefano Della Torre, Richard Schofield (1994). Pellegrino Tibaldi architetto e il San Fedele di Milano. Como: NodoLibri.
- Francesco Paolo Fiore, ed. (1998). Il Quattrocento. Milano: Electa.
- Maria Teresa Fiorio (2006). Le chiese di Milano. Milano: Electa.
- Maria Teresa Fiorio, Valerio Terraroli (2009). Lombardia manierista. Milano: Skira.
- Giuliano Gresleri, ed. (1997). La Galleria Vittorio Emanuele e l'Architetto Mengoni. Imola: La Mandragora.
- Maurizio Grandi; Attilio Pracchi (1991). Milano: guida all'architettura moderna. Bologna: Zanichelli.
- Chiara Gualdoni (2009). Milano. Milano: Skira editore.
- Romano Jodice (1985). L'architettura del ferro: l'Italia (1796-1914). Roma: Bulzoni.
- Mazzocca, Fernando; Morandotti, Alessandro; Colle, Enrico (2001). Milano Neoclassica. Milano: Longanesi & C.
- Oscar Pedro Melano (2004). Milano e l'eclettico Déco, 1900-1950. Milano: Gabriele Mazzotta editore.
- Paolo Mezzanotte, Giacomo Bascapè (1968). Milano nell'arte e nella storia. Milano: Bestetti 1198.
- Francesco Ogliari; Roberto Bagnera (2006). Milano liberty. Pavia: Edizioni Selecta.
- Marco Rossi (1990). Disegno storico dell'arte lombarda. Milano: Vita e Pensiero.
- Marco Rossi, ed. (2005). Lombardia gotica e tardogotica. Milano: Skira.
- Cavagna Sangiuliani di Gualdana, Antonio (1845). Guida di Milano (in Italian). Milano: Bernardoni. p. 794.
- Andrea Speziali, ed. (2015). Italian Liberty : una nuova stagione dell'art nouveau. Forlì: Cartacanta.
- Valerio Terraroli (2004). Lombardia barocca e tardobarocca. Milano: Skira editore.
