= Palazzo Mezzanotte =

Building housing the Italian stock exchange

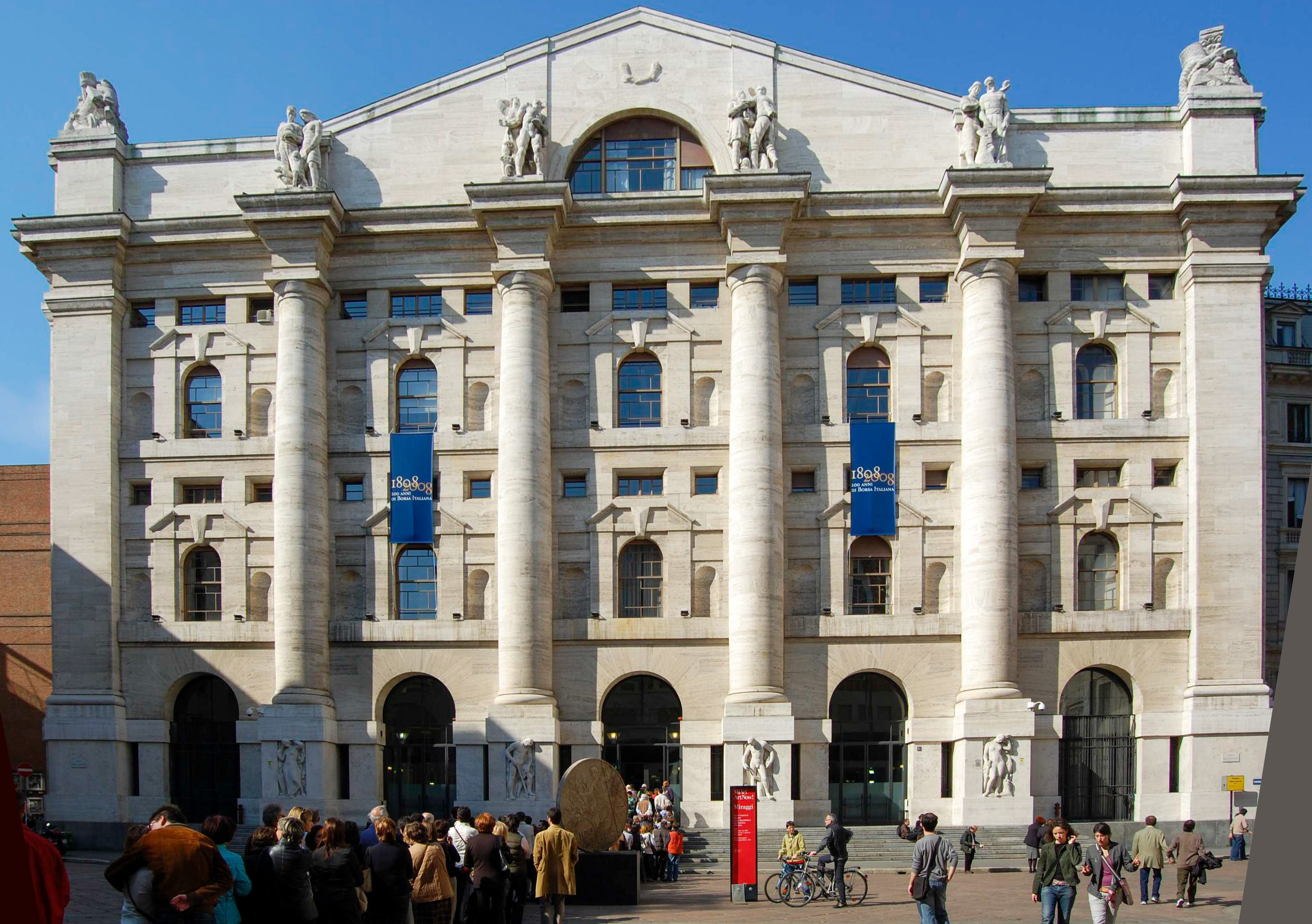
- Facade of Milan Stock Exchange

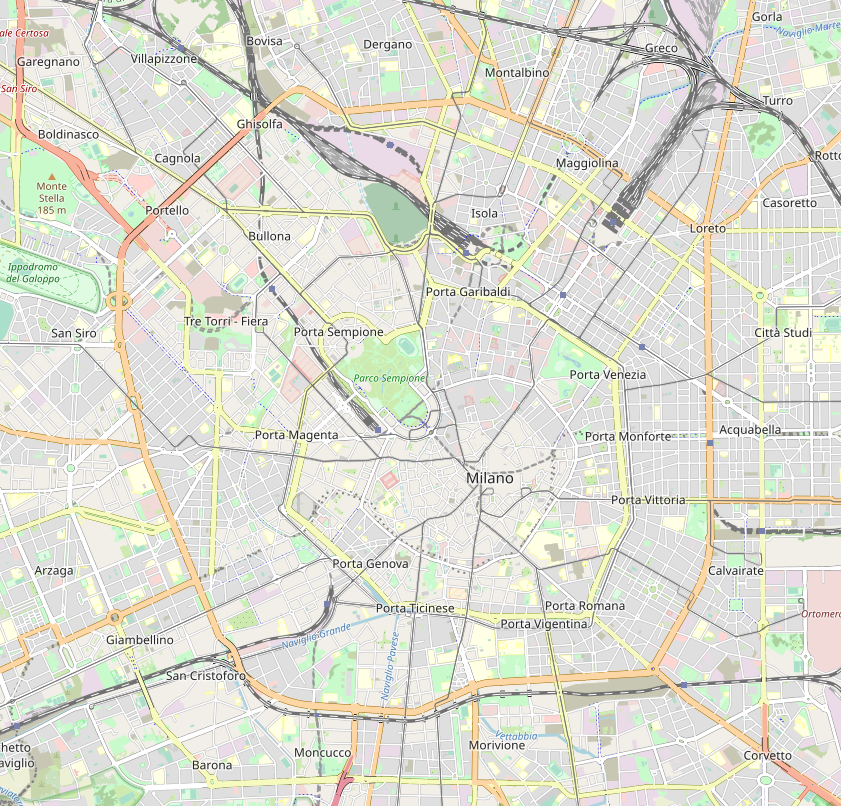
- Location within Milan Location within Italy

General information
- Location: Milan, Italy
- Coordinates: 45°27′54.20″N 9°10′59.49″E

Design and construction
- Architect: Paolo Mezzanotte

Palazzo Mezzanotte ("Midnight Palace"), also known as Palazzo delle Borse ("Stock Exchange Palace") is a 20th-century building of Milan, Italy, and the seat of the Italian stock exchange. It is located in Piazza Affari ("Business Square"), the city square after which the Italian stock exchange itself is nicknamed. The name "Palazzo Mezzanotte" is a reference to Paolo Mezzanotte, the architect who designed the building.

== History ==
The original stock exchange of Milan was established in 1808 in the seat of the Mount of Piety of the city. The following year it was moved to the Palazzo dei Giureconsulti, in Piazza Mercanti, and at the beginning of the 20th century it was relocated again in a newly constructed building in Piazza Cordusio; this building now houses the headquarters of the Poste Italiane postal service, and has thus been renamed Palazzo della Posta ("Post Palace").

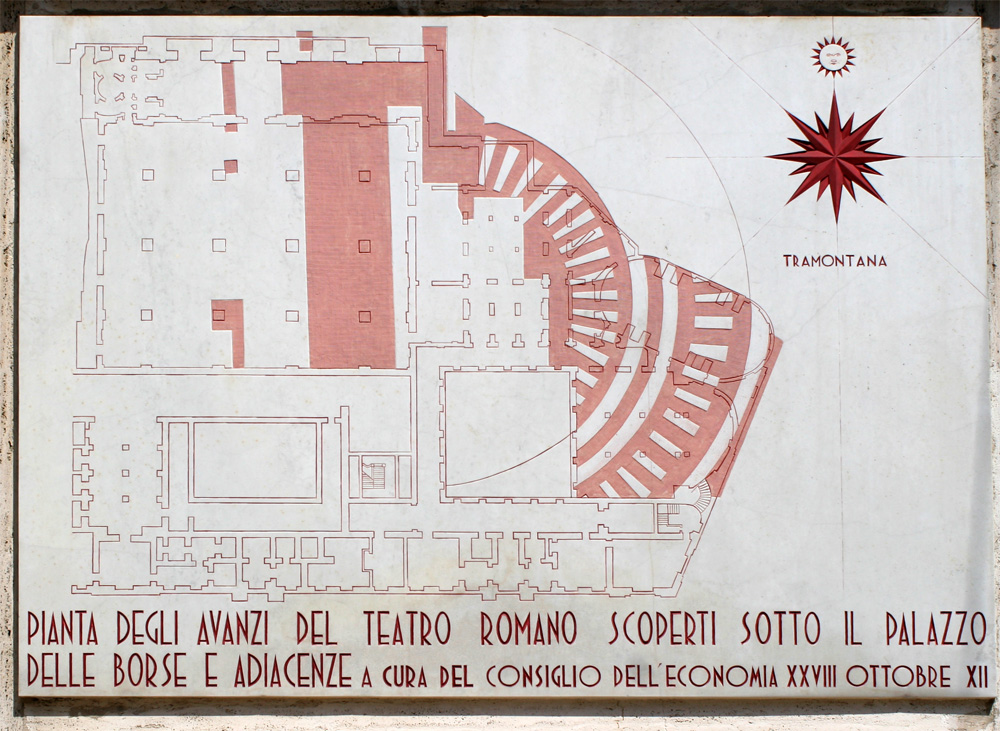
The plaque showing the plan of the Roman theatre found during the excavations for Palazzo Mezzanotte

In 1925, the city authorities of Milan launched a project for a new, larger building for the stocks exchange. Architect Paolo Mezzanotte began his design in 1927, and construction works began in 1929. The ruins of a Roman theatre were discovered during the excavations, and this delayed the construction. A plaque showing the map of those ruins is now affixed on one of the outer walls of the palace.

The building was completed in 1932. At its inauguration, it qualified as the most technologically advanced building in Italy; it was the first building to implement a single call button controlling several elevators, it had air conditioning, and housed the largest electric display of the times (in Italy) where stock quotations where updated in real-time.

The building has a monumental, 36 m high facade, in a style that mixes 20th-century architecture and Neoclassicism; it is realized in marble and travertine and decorated with sculptures by Leone Lodi and Geminiano Cibau.

Within the building, the huge glass ceiling with linear compartments of the grain market hall known as "Bazzi's Cry" was designed by the renowned painter Carlo Bazzi and made by the Milanese art glass company Corvaya e Bazzi; the auction hall, where "called" transactions were conducted, is illuminated from above by a large carved glass canopy depicting the sky dome and constellations, designed by Gio Ponti and made by the Swiss art glass studio Pietro Chiesa (1892–1948).

The main room of the Palace, called "sala delle grida" ("cries room") as businessmen would shout their offers to buy and sell, is lighted by a large net, affixed to the ceiling, which reproduces the constellations in the celestial sphere. Since the 1990s, all business is done remotely via the network, and the room has lost its original function; it is now mostly used to house conferences.
