= Carlo Buzzi =

Italian architect

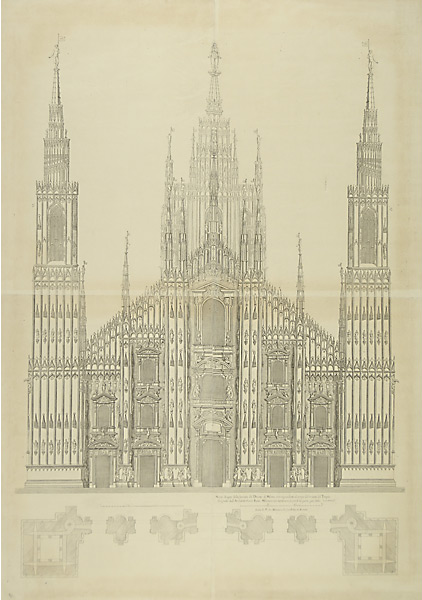
- Sketch of Buzzi's plan for the façade of Milan Cathedral, etched by Cesare Bassani (1647)
- Born: c. 1607; Milan, Duchy of Milan
- Died: 23 September 1658 (aged 50–51); Milan, Duchy of Milan
- Education: Fabio Mangone
- Known for: Architecture
- Notable work: Project for the façade of Milan Cathedral
- Movement: Milanese Baroque

Carlo Buzzi (c. 1607 – 23 September 1658) was an Italian architect, active in Milan.

== Biography ==
There appear to be two prominent artists of the same name in Milan, overlapping somewhat, alive in the late 16th and early 17th century. The present Carlo Buzzi, whose name may also be written as Buti, Buzio, Butio, Albutio, or Albuzio, was an exponent of the Milanese Baroque style of Galeazzo Alessi and Francesco Maria Richini, although he strongly supported the continuation of Gothic forms at Milan Cathedral, of which he was architect between 1638 and 1658, after the death of Fabio Mangone.

The late date for the earliest work on the building (1385) meant that Gothic design had continued into the Renaissance, and controversy raged between ‘Classicists’ and ‘Goths’ over the correct way to finish it. Buzzi made several designs for the façade in a conservative Gothic style, based on the existing side elevations but incorporating the Renaissance window details already constructed. One of these projects was accepted, but a strongly argued preference expressed by Gian Lorenzo Bernini (1656) for an alternative scheme by Francesco Borromini in a Gothicized classical style brought work to a standstill. The façade was ultimately completed (1806–13) to one of Buzzi’s designs (slightly modified) on the orders of Napoleon.

Buzzi worked extensively in and around Milan. His extant works include the octagonal nucleus (1641), later significantly altered, of the sanctuary of Santa Maria del Bosco, Imbersago; a new campanile (1643) for Santo Stefano Maggiore, Milan; the reconstruction (1645) of the Palazzo delle Scuole Palatine, Piazza Mercanti, with an ornate façade consisting of a rusticated upper storey resting on an arcade of paired columns in imitation of the nearby Palazzo dei Giureconsulti (1558–68) by Vincenzo Seregni; and the nave, campanile and façade of Sant'Ambrogio (1648; unfinished), Merate, in severe Roman style.

== Bibliography ==
- Mezzanotte, Paolo (1972). "BUZZI, Carlo". Dizionario Biografico degli Italiani (in Italian). Vol. 15: Buffoli–Caccianemici. Rome: Istituto dell'Enciclopedia Italiana. ISBN 978-88-12-00032-6.
