= Oh bej! Oh bej! =

Christmas market in Milan, Italy

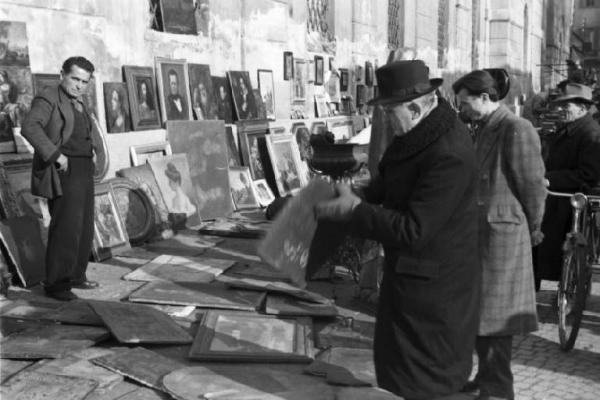
The fair in the 1950s, photograph by Federico Patellani

Oh bej! Oh bej! (Milanese pronunciation: [u ˈbɛj u ˈbɛj] or [ɔ ˈbɛj ɔ ˈbɛj]; lit. 'oh so nice! oh so nice!') is the most important and traditional Christmas fair in Milan, Italy. It is held from 7 December (day of the patron saint of Milan, Ambrose) until the following Sunday. The fair is also informally known as the Fiera di Sant'Ambrogio (Milanese: Fera de Sant Ambroeus; 'Saint Ambrose Fair').

The Oh bej! Oh bej! fair has been held in different areas of Milan; until 1886, it was located in Piazza Mercanti (in the surroundings of the Duomo); from 1886 to 2006, it was held by the Basilica of Sant'Ambrogio; in 2006, it was relocated again, to the area of the Sforza Castle.

The most typical goods that are sold at Oh bej! Oh bej! are sweets and Christmas or winter delicacies, handcrafts such as Christmas decorations, toys, antiques, souvenirs, bric-à-bracs, and more. The fair is usually very crowded; this is partly because, as Saint Ambrose Day is immediately followed by the Immaculate Conception Day (an Italian national holiday), and potentially be followed by a week-end, the Milanese usually have several free days in the fair's days.

== History ==
While celebrations devoted to Ambrose, in Milan, date back to the late 13th century, the actual Oh bej! Oh bej! fair is said to have been established in 1510, on the occasion of Giannetto Castiglione, delegate of Pope Pius IV, visiting Milan on 7 December. According to the legend, Giannetto wanted to ingratiate himself with the Milanese, and thus entered the city carrying boxes full of sweets and toys for the Milanese children. A cheerful crowd followed Giannetto to the Basilica of Sant'Ambrogio, and thereafter the fair was established to commemorate that day. The name Oh bej! Oh bej! is supposedly a reference to the cheerful cries of the Milanese children receiving presents from Giannetto.
