= Piazza Mercanti =

Square in Milan, Italy

Coordinates: 45°27′53.83″N 9°11′16.64″E

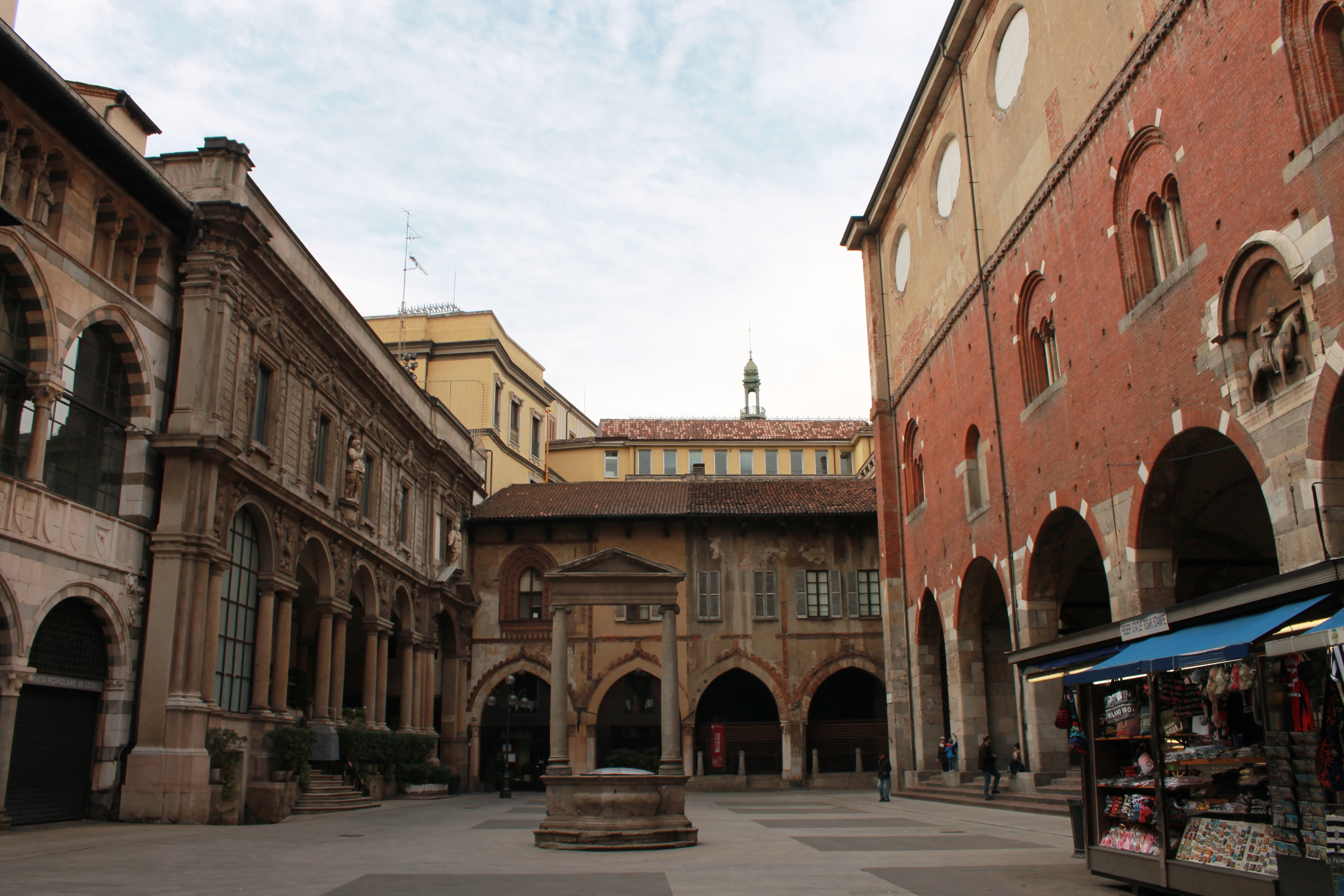
Piazza Mercanti in Milan. On the left, the Loggia degli Osii (farther) and Palazzo delle Scuole Palatine (closer); on the right, the Palazzo della Ragione

Piazza Mercanti ("Merchants Square") is a central city square of Milan, Italy. It is located between Piazza del Duomo, which marks the centre of the modern city of Milan, and Piazza Cordusio, and it used to be the heart of the city in the Middle Ages. At the time, the square was larger than it is now (as part of it has later become what is now Via Mercanti, the street located between Palazzo dei Giureconsulti and Palazzo della Ragione) and known as "Piazza del Broletto", after the "Broletto Nuovo", the palace that occupied the centre of the square (now on the north side). In the 13th century, there were six entry points to the square, each associated to a specific trade, from sword blacksmiths to hat makers.

Until the late 19th century, Oh bej! Oh bej! (the most important and traditional fair of Milan) was held in Piazza Mercanti.

== The palaces ==
The square houses four main buildings:

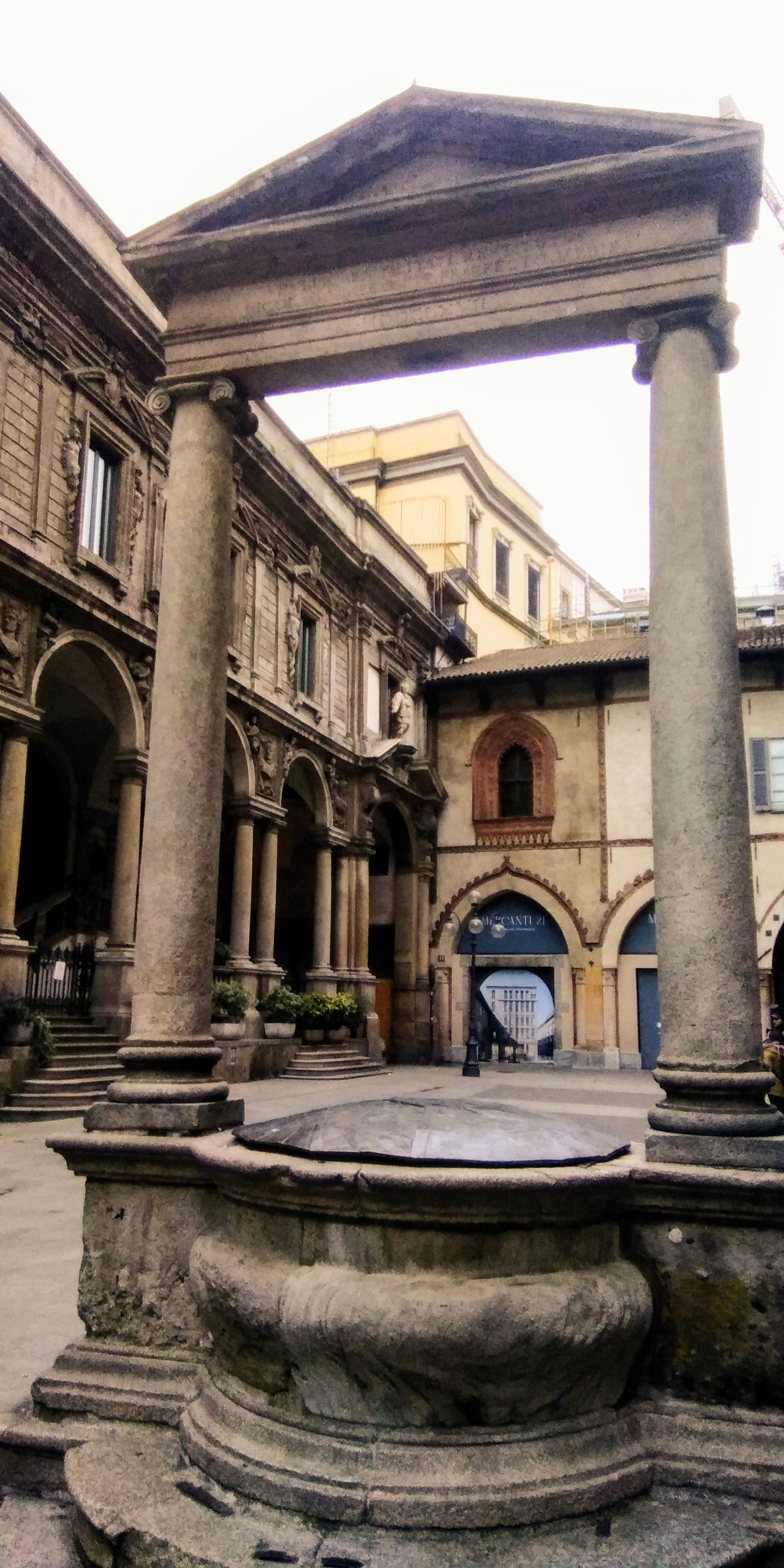
16th century pit surmounted by columns facing the Gothic Casa Panigarola

- "Broletto Nuovo", also known as Palazzo della Ragione, occupies the north-eastern side. It was built in 1233, and served as the "broletto", i.e., the administrative headquarters of the city. In the original layout of the piazza, which extended further to the north-east, the palace was located in the centre;
- Casa Panigarola, also known as "Palazzo dei Notai" (Notary's Palace): Gothic palace built in the 15th century, is on the south-western side;
- Palazzo delle Scuole Palatine: baroque palace built in the 17th century and designed by Carlo Buzzi, is on the south-eastern side; it replaced a former building known as "Scuole del Broletto" ("Broletto Schools");
- Loggia degli Osii: Loggia built in 1316 on the south-eastern side for Matteo I Visconti and designed by Scoto da San Gimignano; this was also an administrative seat, and included the parlera, i.e., the balcony from which the authorities addressed the population.

The 16th century Palazzo dei Giureconsulti, now located in Via Mercanti, used to mark the north-eastern side of the piazza before it was redesigned. It was built in 1561 on a design by Vincenzo Seregni; the tower of the building is much older, dating back to the 13th century (although it was largely restored in the 17th century).

At the centre of the square is a 16th-century pit, surmounted by two 18th-century columns. The pit was originally adjacent to the Palazzo dei Giureconsulti; where it stands now, a large stone was found, known as the "pietra dei falliti" ("bankrupts stone"), where those guilty of bankruptcy would have their naked bottom exposed as a penance.

== Monuments ==
A number of statues and other monuments are found in Piazza Mercanti. Palazzo della Ragione has two renowned reliefs, one of a boar (that is reportedly of Roman origin and associated to the legend of the scrofa semilanuta) and one representing Oldrado da Tresseno, who ordered the construction of the palace itself.

Sculptor Giovan Pietro Lasagna has realized two statues of the square, that dedicated to Ausonius (located on Porta Orefici, i.e., the "Jewellers' Portal", one of the entry points to the square) and that dedicated to Augustine of Hippo (on the façade of the Scuole Palatine).

Another notable statue dedicated to Ambrose, by sculptor Luigi Scorzini, is found on the façade of the Palazzo dei Giureconsulti.

== References in popular culture ==
A sequence of the film Chiedimi se sono felice by the comedian trio Aldo, Giovanni e Giacomo has the trio play a basket game in Piazza Mercanti, using the iron aureola of the statue of a saint as the basket. The statue is an invention of the movie makers: it is not actually found in the square.
