= Palazzo delle Scuole Palatine =

Building in Milan, Italy

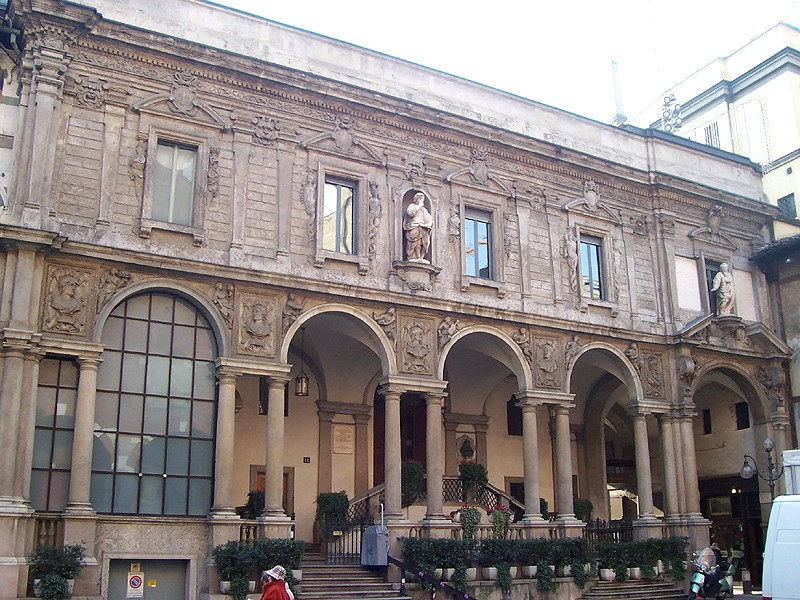
- Palazzo delle Scuole Palatine

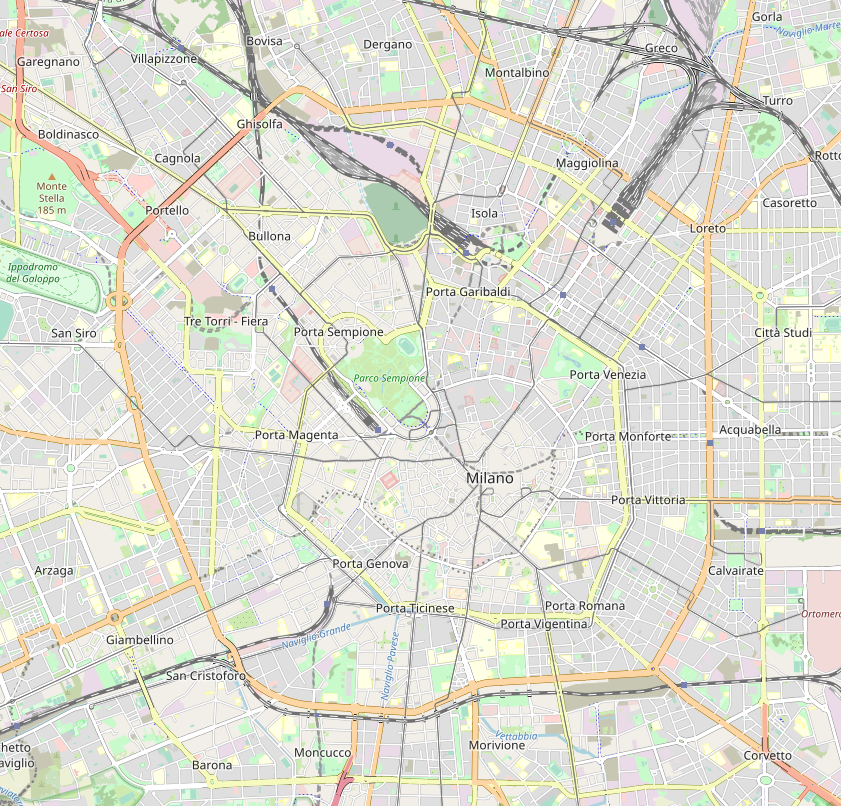
- Location within Milan Location within Italy

General information
- Location: Milan, Italy
- Coordinates: 45°27′53.46″N 9°11′14.46″E

The Palazzo delle Scuole Palatine ("Palace of the Palatine Schools") is a historic building of Milan, Italy, located in Piazza Mercanti, the former city centre in the Middle Ages. It served as the seat of the most prestigious higher school of medieval Milan. Many notable Milanese scholars of different ages studied or taught in these schools; Augustine of Hippo and Cesare Beccaria, among others, served as teachers in the Palatine. The current building dates back to 1644, when it replaced an older one, which had the same function and was destroyed by a fire.

The school was established in Piazza Mercanti under Giovanni Maria Visconti. In 1644, they were destroyed by a fire, and rebuilt based on the prestigious model of the nearby Palazzo dei Giureconsulti, by architect Carlo Buzzi.

The building is decorated with several monuments, including a statue of the Ancient Roman poet Ausonius and a plaque with one of his epigrams celebrating Milan as the "New Rome" of the 4th century. There is also a statue of Augustine by sculptor Pietro Lasagna.

== Sources ==
- O.P. Melano, Milano di terracotta e mattoni, Mazzotta, 2002
- A. Lanza and M. Somarè, Milano e suoi palazzi - Porta Vercellina, Comasina e Nuova, Libreria Milanese, pp. 91–93
