= Casa Panigarola =

Historic building in Milan, Italy

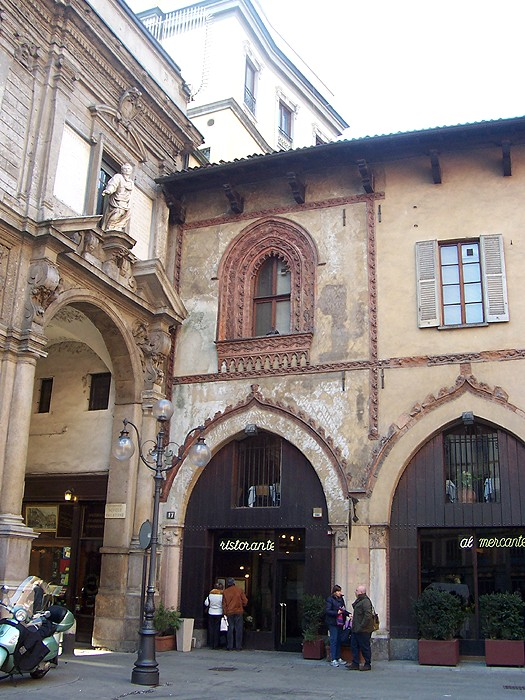

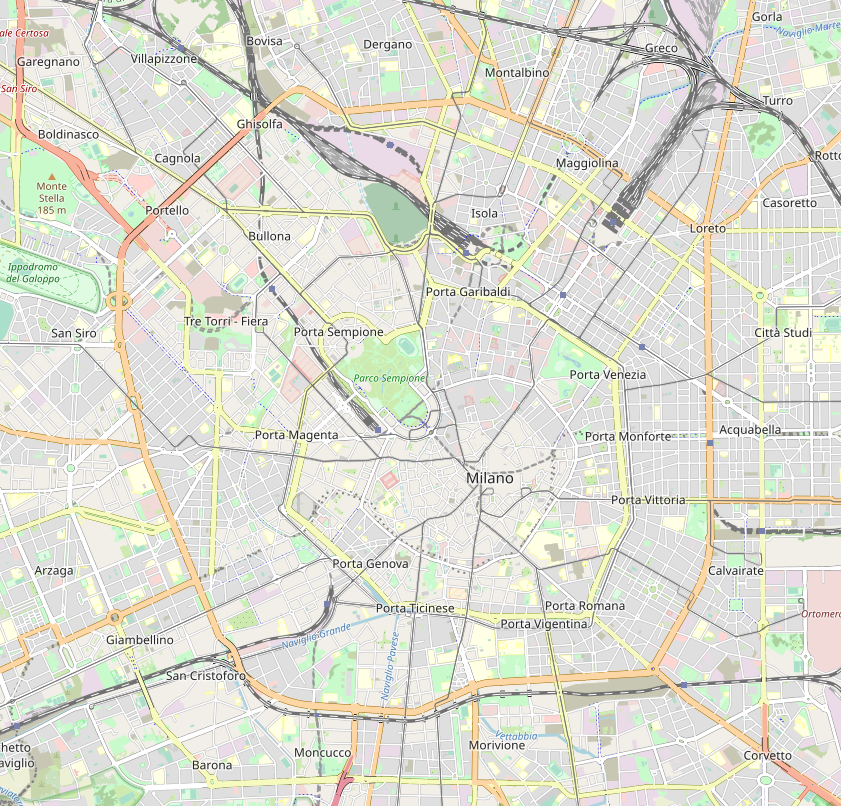
- Location within Milan Location within Italy

General information
- Location: Milan, Italy
- Coordinates: 45°27′53.21″N 9°11′14.3″E

Casa Panigarola (or Casa dei Panigarola), also known as Palazzo dei Notai ("Palace of the Notaries"), is a historic building of Milan, Italy, located in Piazza Mercanti, former city centre in the Middle Ages. It is named after the House of Panigarola, a family of notaries from Gallarate, that owned the building until 1741. The building thus served as a notary seat, and the activities therein were strictly related to those that occurred in the adjacent Palazzo della Ragione, where trials were held.

The palace occupies the west side of the rectangular Piazza Mercanti city square. While its original structure dates back to the age of medieval communes, it was largely rebuilt in the 15th century in Gothic style. The facade was designed by Giovanni Solari in 1466 and largely restored in 1899 by Luca Beltrami. A minor restoration occurred in 1967, under the supervision of Antonio Cassi Ramelli.

In the floor of the portico, there is a notable relief with the biscione, Milan's emblem under the House of Sforza. Another notable decoration of the palace is a ceramic plaque dating back to 1448, signed by Tommaso da Caponago (a 15th-century lawyer), that warns against the perils of recurring to the law to solve conflicts.
