= Paolo Mezzanotte =

Italian architect and engineer (1878–1969)

- Born: 25 April 1878; Milan, Kingdom of Italy
- Died: 9 October 1969 (aged 91); Inverigo, Province of Como, Italy
- Education: Polytechnic University of Milan
- Occupations: Architect, engineer

Paolo Mezzanotte (25 April 1878 – 9 October 1969) was an Italian architect, engineer, architectural historian, and engraver. Active primarily in Milan, he is best known for designing the Palazzo Mezzanotte, the historic headquarters of the Borsa Italiana, completed in 1932.

== Life and career ==
Born in Milan, Mezzanotte graduated in engineering from the Polytechnic University in 1900. He worked on a wide range of public and religious buildings, taught architectural drawing at the Polytechnic, and served on several heritage and artistic commissions in Milan. He also collaborated with architects including Enrico Agostino Griffini and maintained a parallel career as an architectural historian and engraver.

Among his principal works are the church of the Sacred Heart of the Capuchins in Milan (1906–1911), the Casa dei Fasci Milanesi (1927, with his brother Vittorio), and the Palazzo delle Borse (1927–1932).
