= Palazzo dei Giureconsulti =

Coordinates: 45°27′54.25″N 9°11′17.06″E

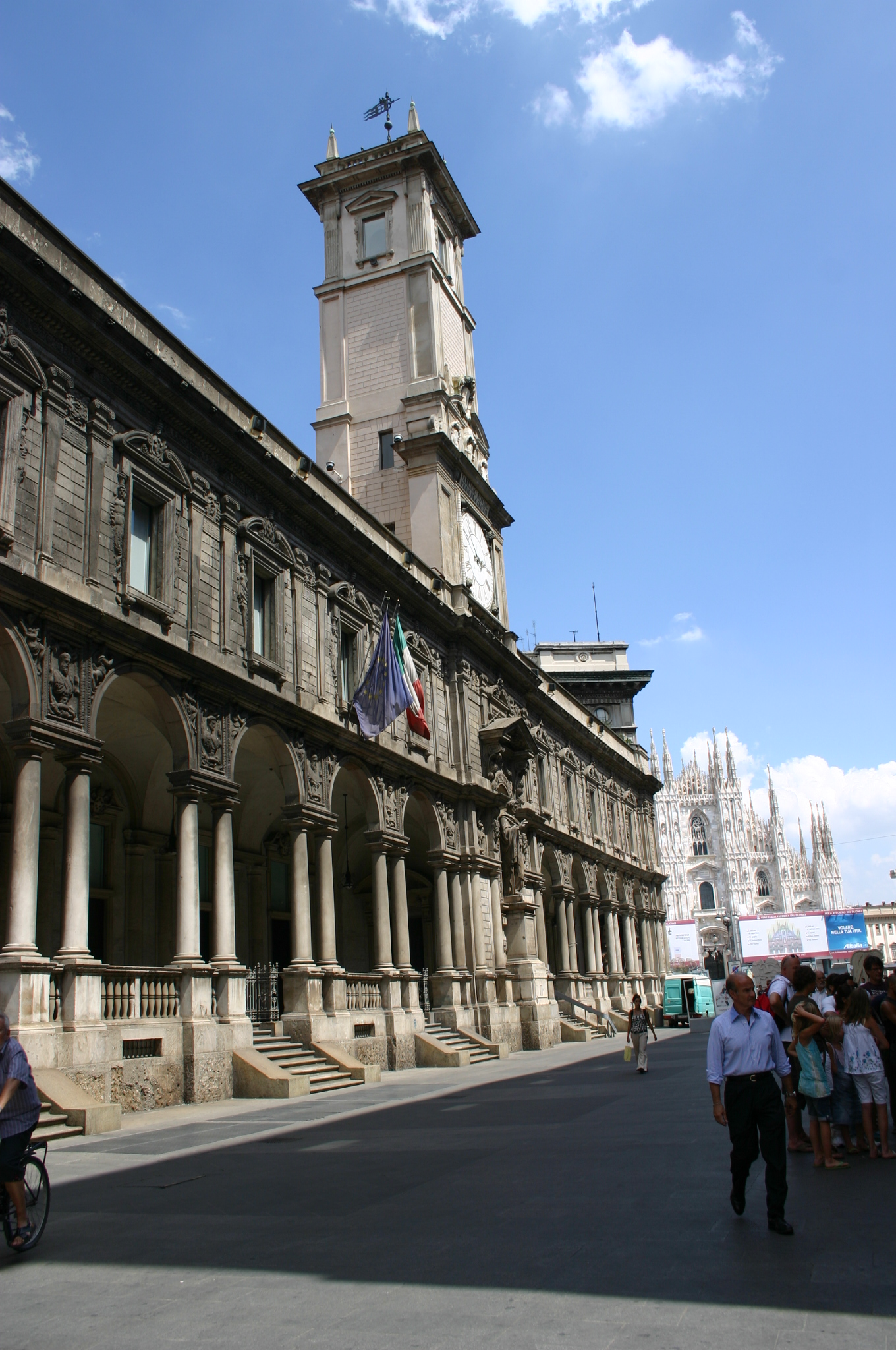
- Palazzo dei Giureconsulti looking east, with the Duomo in the background.
- Interactive map of the Palazzo dei Giureconsulti area

General information
- Location: Milan, Italy
- Construction started: 1562
- Client: Pope Pius IV

Design and construction
- Architect: Vincenzo Seregni

The Giureconsulti Palace (in Italian: Palazzo dei Giureconsulti), also known as Palazzo Affari ai Giureconsulti or simply Palazzo Affari, is a 16th-century building of Milan, Italy. It is located in Piazza Mercanti, former city centre in the Middle Ages.

The construction of the palace began in 1562 on a design by architect Vincenzo Seregni. The palace replaced an older one (dating back to the 13th century), which was demolished. The overall style of the building and its decoration is Manneristic.

A pre-existing tower by Napo Torriani was preserved and adapted to the new architecture as a bell tower; the bell, which was nicknamed "Zavataria" after Zavatario della Strada who donated it, rang to announce such events as public executions. The bell was later replaced by a clock.

The building originally served as the seat of the Collegio dei Nobili Dottori ("College of the Noble Doctors"), a school for aspiring politicians and lawyers. After the 18th century it was used for other functions, including as a stock exchange, as the seat of the telegraph company, as the seat of the Popolare di Milano bank, and finally as the seat of the Chamber of Commerce (from 1911). Today, the building is still the property of the Chamber of Commerce.

The palace was severely damaged by the bombings of World War II but was thoroughly restored in the 1980s by Gianni Mezzanotte. During this restoration, the palace was enhanced with hi-tech equipment, such as modern communication lines and multimedia appliances, to create a prestigious multi-functional venue to accommodate events, conferences, and such. It was at this time that the new denomination of "Palazzo Affari" was adopted, although the Palace is still largely known by its former name.
