= Vincenzo Seregni =

Italian architect

- Born: 1519; Seregno, region of Lombardy, Italy
- Died: 1594 (aged 74–75); Milan, Italy
- Known for: Architecture
- Movement: Mannerism

Vincenzo Seregni (1519–1594), also known as Vincenzo da Seregno or Vincenzo dall'Orto, was an Italian mannerist architect.

== Biography ==
He was born in Seregno, and died in Milan. Seregni was active in Lombardy, mainly in Milan. Since 1537, he had worked with the Fabbrica del Duomo of Milan. In 1555, after the death of Cristoforo Lombardo, il Lombardino, he was appointed as their main architect until 1567, When at the request of the archbishop Carlo Borromeo, he was replaced with Pellegrino Tibaldi.
