= Marco Solari =

Italian architect and engineer (c. 1355 – 1405)

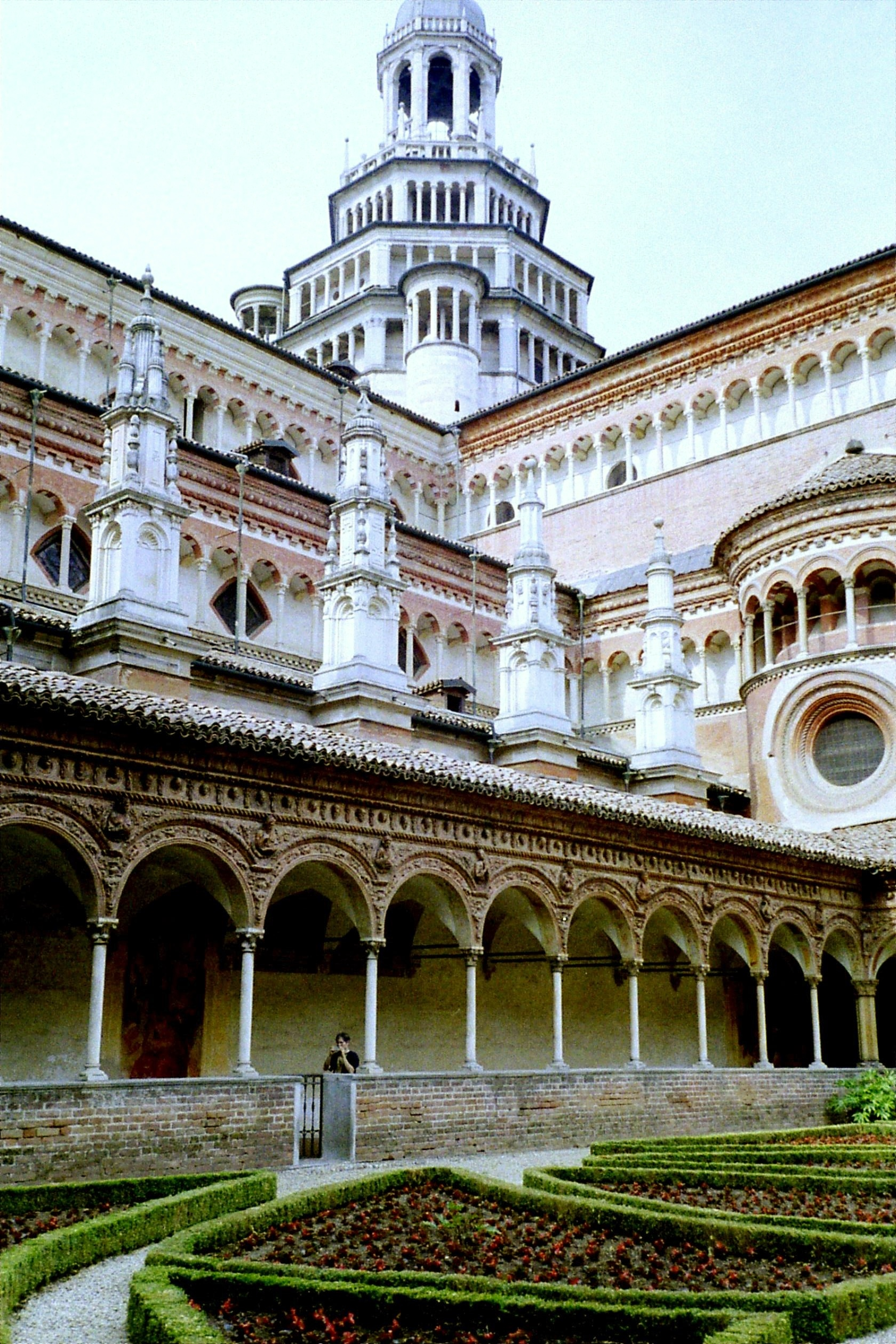
The Certosa di Pavia

Marco Solari (c. 1355 – 1405) was a Swiss–Italian architect, engineer, and sculptor.

== Biography ==
Marco Solari, often named Marco da Carona, was born in the village of Carona, in what today is the Swiss canton of Ticino. He is the progenitor of the Solari da Carona family, a masonic Lombardian dynasty.

Solari is known as one of the chief architects of the Certosa di Pavia. Gian Galeazzo Visconti, hereditary lord and first Duke of Milan, first commissioned Solari as a chief architect of the Certosa di Pavia in 1396.

Solari is also known for his work as a master on the Duomo of Milan, starting in 1399.

== Genealogy ==
Marco (active 1387–1405), Architect and Sculptor
Alberto	Giovanni (Milan c. 1400 – 1482) Architect of Certosa di Pavia (1428–62) and the Duomo di Milano (1452–69)	Pietro
Guiniforte (or Boniforte) (Milan 1429–1481) Architect of the Certosa di Pavia (1462–81) and the Duomo di Milano (1459–81)	Francesco (active 1446–1469) Architect and Sculptor	Bartolomeo or Bertola
Maddalena born 1476 wife of Giovanni Antonio Amadeo	Francesco	Pietro Antonio (Milan circa mid 15th century – Moscow 1493) Architect and Sculptor	Cristoforo, known as il Gobbo (the Hunchback) (1467/1470 – 1524) Architect & Sculptor	Andrea (c. 1460 – c. 1520) Milanese Painter
