= Giovanni Solari =

Italian architect and engineer (died 1481)

Giovanni Solari (c. 1400 – 1481) was an Italian architect and engineer.

== Life ==
He was born in Milan, the son of the architect Marco Solari, who was chief of the works of the Duomo of Milan. Giovanni Solari directed the construction of the Certosa di Pavia from 1428 to 1462 and that of the Duomo from 1452 to 1469. He was succeeded in Pavia by his son Guiniforte Solari. His other son Francesco was master of Giovanni Antonio Amadeo.

Giovanni Solari also worked as military engineer for Duke Galeazzo Maria Sforza. He died in Milan in 1481.
