= Cristoforo Mantegazza =

Italian sculptor

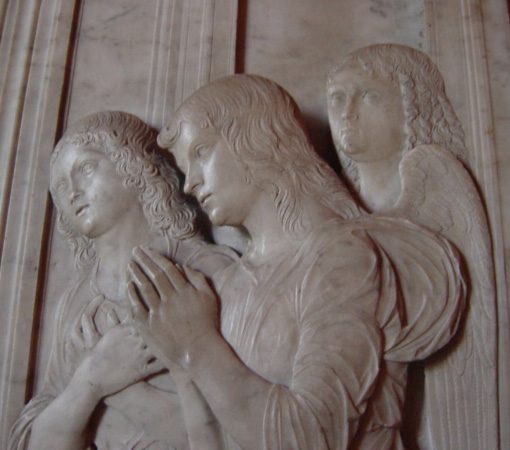
Relief of angels, attributed to Mantegazza

Cristoforo Mantegazza (c. 1430 – 1482) was an Italian sculptor who was active from 1464.

He was born in Pavia. Among his other works, he collaborated with his brother Antonio on the façade of the Certosa of Pavia (relief with the Expulsion from the Garden of Eden), one of the masterworks of northern Italy's Renaissance. For a certain period, he also directed the construction of that building.
