= Santa Maria alla Fontana, Milan =

Church in Milan, Italy

Church of Saint Mary at the Fountain (Chiesa di Santa Maria alla Fontana)
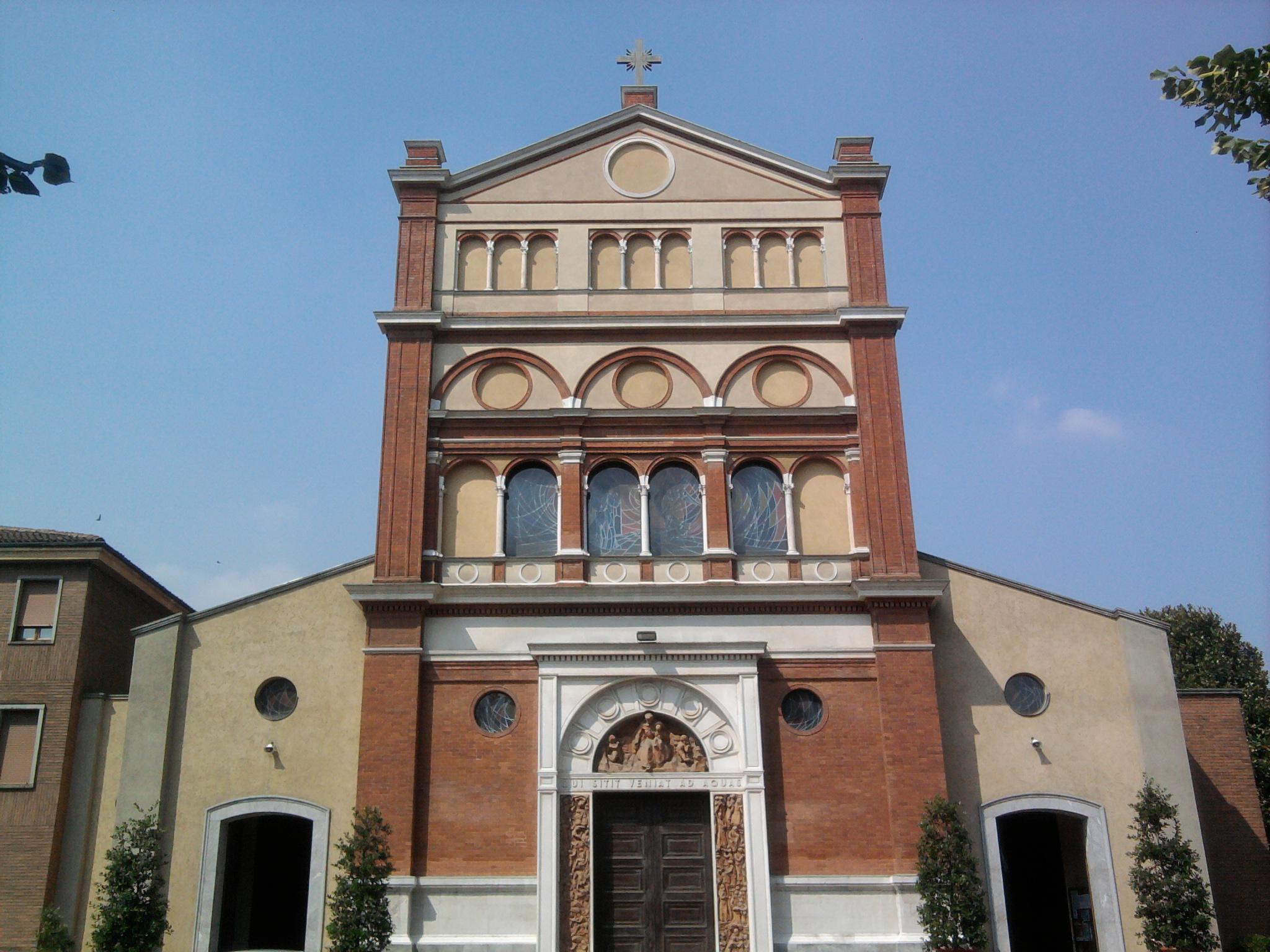
- Façade of the church.

Religion
- Affiliation: Roman Catholic
- Province: Milan
- Status: Active

Location
- Location: Milan, Italy
- Interactive map of Church of Saint Mary at the Fountain (Chiesa di Santa Maria alla Fontana)
- Coordinates: 45.492535°N 9.187883°E

Architecture
- Architect: Giovanni Antonio Amadeo
- Type: Church
- Groundbreaking: 1507

Chiesa di Santa Maria alla Fontana is a church in Milan, Italy. Built in 1508, it was traditionally attributed to Leonardo da Vinci, Bramante or Cristoforo Solari (under the commission of Charles II d'Amboise, the French governor of the city, who was allegedly healed by a spring on the site of the future church in 1507): a document found in 1982, however, revealed that it was designed by Giovanni Antonio Amadeo.
