= Francesco Solari =

Italian sculptor (c. 1415 – 1469)

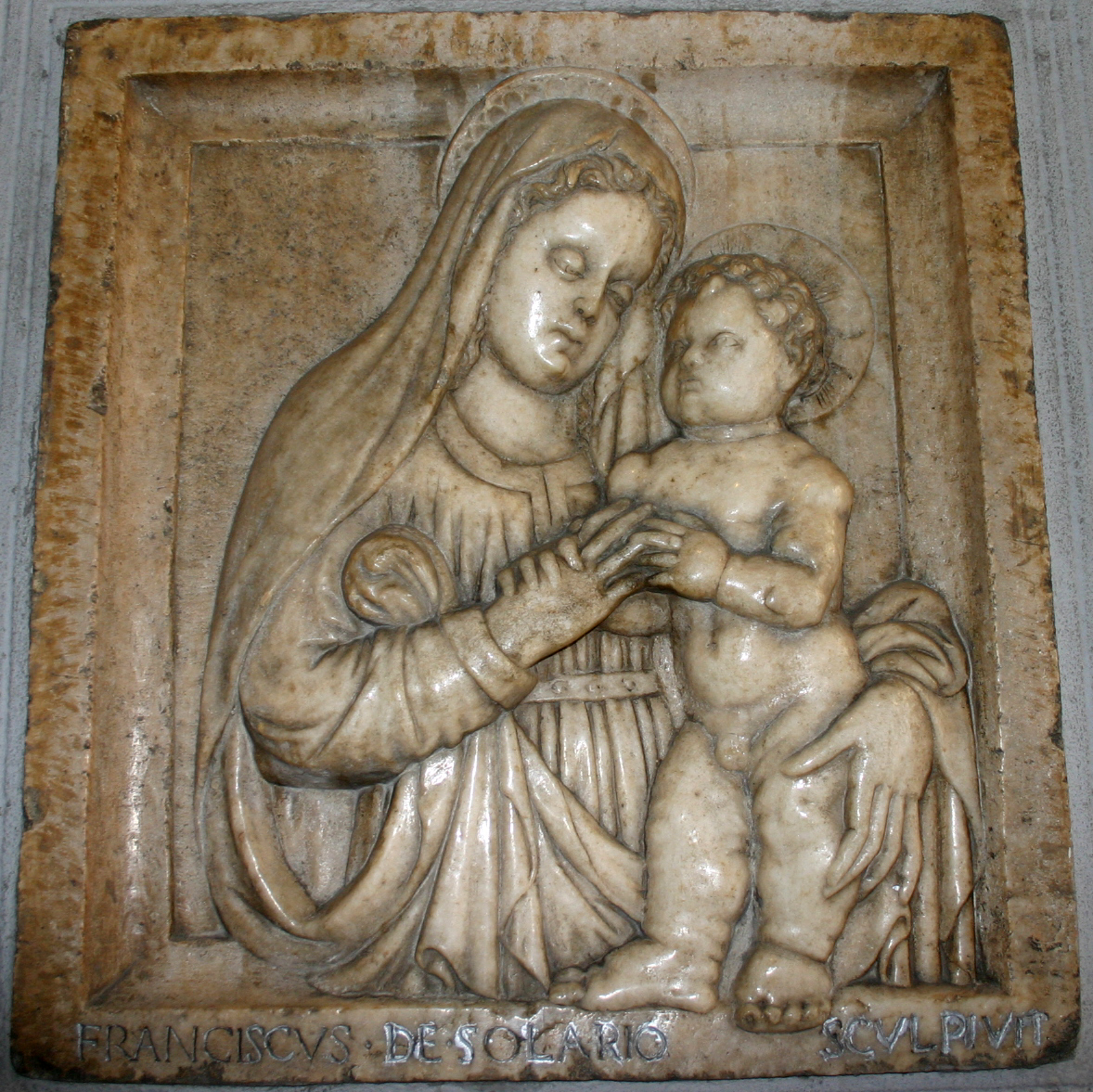
Madonna with Child, church of Sant'Angelo, Milan.

Francesco Solari (c. 1415 – 1469) was an Italian sculptor, architect and engineer.

He was born in Milan, the son of Giovanni Solari and the brother of Guiniforte Solari.

Around 1445, he is known to be working in decorations for the church of the Villa in Castiglione Olona, the Duomo of Milan and the Certosa of Pavia, where Guiniforte was director of the works. Starting from a least 1464, he was master to Giovanni Antonio Amadeo.

He died in Milan in 1469.
