= Bernardino de Rossi =

Italian painter

Bernardino de Rossi, who worked at Pavia, was one of the artists called to Milan in 1490 to decorate the Porta Giovia Palace of Lodovico Sforza. In the church of Santa Maria della Pusterla, Pavia, is a picture of the 'Virgin, with Saints and Donors,' signed and dated by him in 1491. Between the years 1498 and 1508 he decorated the Certosa of Pavia with wall paintings, of which the frescoes of the 'Eternal,' the 'Prophets,' and the 'Virgin Annunciate' remain. In 1511 he executed some frescoes for the church at Vigano, belonging to the Carthusians of Pavia, which have now disappeared. No certain dates can be given of his birth or death.
