= Certosa di Pavia =

Monastery and complex in Lombardy, Italy

Coordinates: 45.257°N 9.148°E

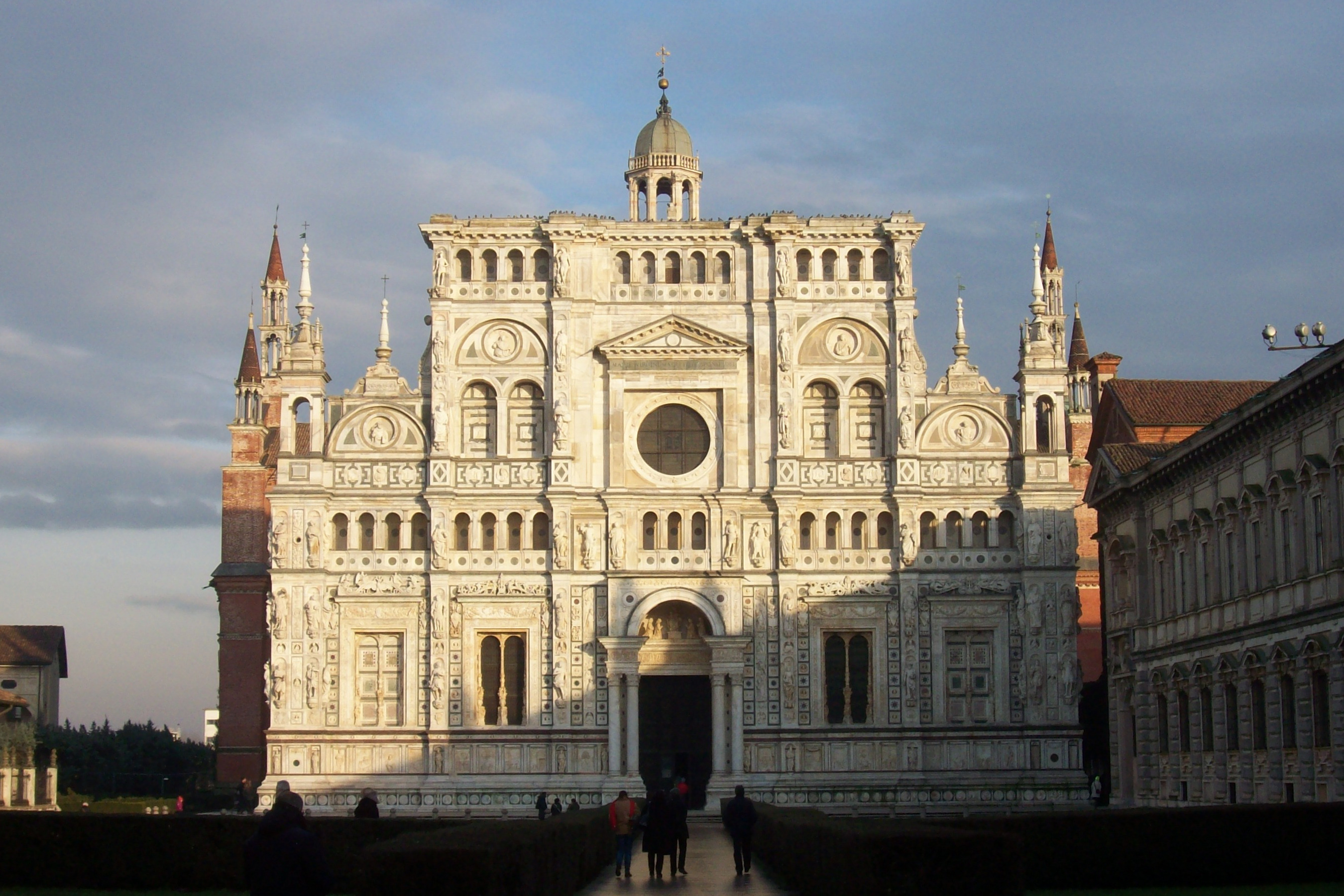
- Façade.

Religion
- Affiliation: Catholic
- Province: Pavia
- Year consecrated: 1497
- Status: Active

Location
- Location: Certosa di Pavia, Italy
- Interactive map of Certosa di Pavia

Architecture
- Type: Church
- Style: Gothic, Renaissance, Mannerism, Baroque

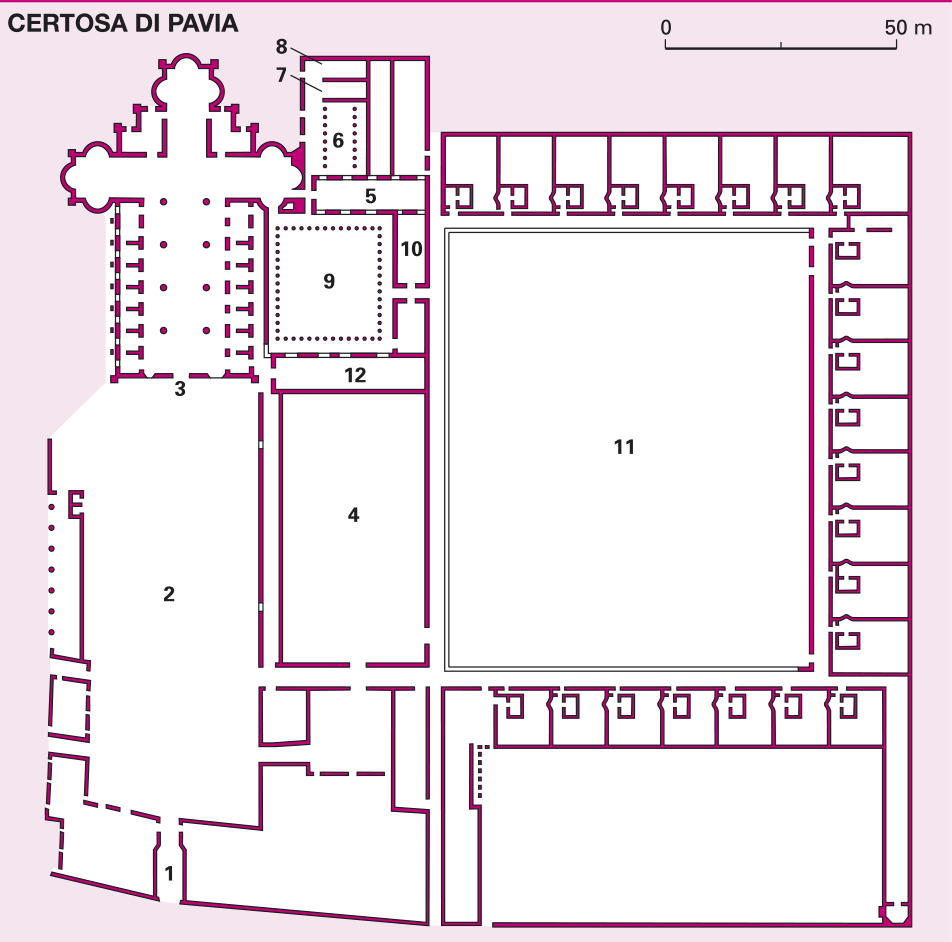
Plan of the Certosa di Pavia. (1) Vestibule, (2) Forecourt, (3) Fifth of the Church, (4) Guesthouse (or Ducal Palace), (5) New sacristy, (6) Vestibule cloister, (7) Brothers’ Chapter, (8) Fathers’ Chapter, (9) Small cloister, (10) Library, (11) Large cloister, (12) Monks' refectory.

The Certosa di Pavia is a monastery complex in Lombardy, Northern Italy, situated near a small village of the same name in the Province of Pavia, 8 km (5.0 mi) north of Pavia. Built from 1396 to 1495, it was once located at the end of the Visconti Park a large hunting park and pleasure ground belonging to the Visconti dukes of Milan, of which today only scattered parts remain. It is one of the largest monasteries in Italy.

Certosa is the Italian translation of Charterhouse: a monastery of the cloistered monastic order of Carthusians founded by St. Bruno in 1044 at Grande Chartreuse. Though the Carthusians in their early centuries were known for their seclusion and asceticism and the plainness of their architecture, the Certosa is renowned for the exuberance of its architecture, in both the Gothic and Renaissance styles, and for its collection of artworks which are particularly representative of the region.

== History ==
Gian Galeazzo Visconti, hereditary lord and first Duke of Milan, commissioned the building of the Certosa from the architect Marco Solari, laying the foundation stone on 27 August 1396, as recorded by a bas-relief on the façade. The location was strategically chosen midway between Milan and Pavia, the second city of the Duchy, where the Duke held one of his courts, at the end of the Visconti Park, which connected the Certosa to the castle of Pavia.

The Visconti Park, at the top, near the northern walls of the park, is the Certosa.

The Certosa is also the result of the political aspirations of Gian Galeazzo. In a coup in 1385, Gian Galeazzo had deposed his uncle Bernabò Visconti, replacing him as lord of the former Visconti domains including Milan. However, like his father Galeazzo II, Gian Galeazzo resided and maintained his court in Pavia, the former capital of the Lombard kings and of the kingdom of Italy. Gian Galeazzo aspired to re-establish a new kingdom in Northern Italy, matching these historical examples.

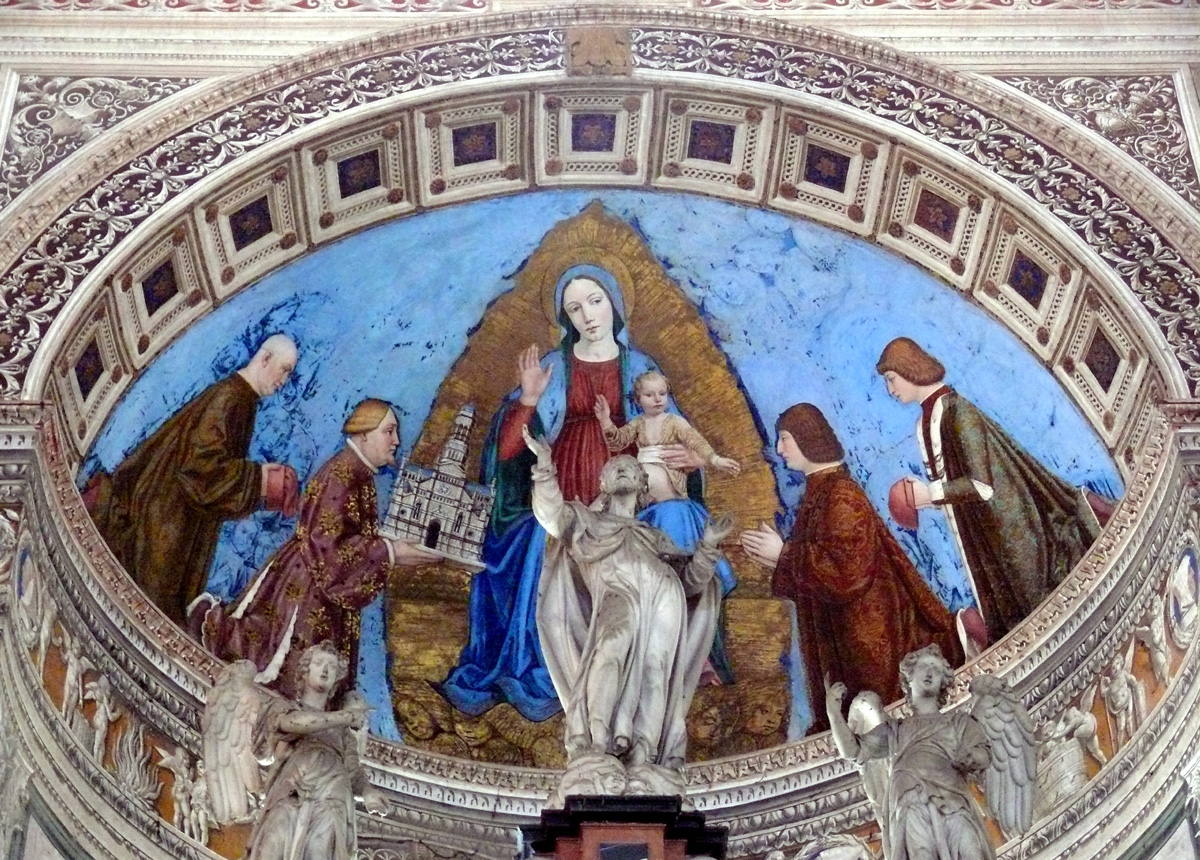
Ambrogio da Fossano, Duke Gian Galeazzo donates the Charterhouse to the Madonna.

In 1386, the people of Milan decided to rebuild Milan Cathedral. However, relations between Gian Galeazzo and the heads of the Fabbrica del Duomo (the consortium of masons and builders chosen by the citizens of Milan) were often tense: the lord intended to transform Milan cathedral into a dynastic mausoleum of the dynasty, putting the funeral monument of his father Galeazzo II in the central part of the cathedral. This raised strong opposition from both the Fabbrica and the Milanese, who zealously guarded their autonomy. Ultimately Gian Galeazzo chose to build a new church: the Certosa of Pavia, to serve as a mausoleum for the Visconti dynasty. Unscrupulously, he assigned many employees of the Fabbrica del Duomo, such as Giacomo da Campione or Giovannino de 'Grassi for this new projects. For the Duke, the Duomo became the church for burial of nobles, patricians, people, artisan and merchant guilds of Milan, while the Certosa would service the Duchy.

Giovanni Cristoforo Romano, Benedetto Briosco, tomb of Gian Galeazzo Visconti.

The church, the last edifice of the complex to be built, was to be the family mausoleum of the Visconti. It was designed as a grand structure with a nave and two aisles, a type unusual for the Carthusian Order. The nave, in the Gothic style, was completed in 1465.

Given the absence of marble and stone quarries near the Certosa, around the middle of the fifteenth century, stone material became scarce for construction. The Carthusians enjoyed substantial income from the vast agricultural lands donated by Gian Galeazzo Visconti and his successors the Sforza. Unlike other large Lombard fabbrici, the Cathedral of Pavia, never acquired their own marble quarries, but always relied on private suppliers, often relying mainly on the Veneranda Fabbrica del Duomo di Milano. By 1463 the Milanese yard supplied the marble for the capitals of the cloisters, and in 1473 a contract between the Fabbrica del Duomo and the monks of the Certosa, stipulated the Fabbrica undertook to guarantee a continuous supply of marble and building stone to the Certosa. Control over the marble was entrusted to Guiniforte Solari, who at the time was responsible for both construction sites. The materials, which, similarly to those for the Milan Cathedral, enjoyed the ducal exemption from duties, reached the Certosa via the Navigliaccio and were disembarked in Binasco, from where they continued by cart to the construction site, however, after the restoration of the section navigation between Binasco and Pavia (1473) it was possible to unload the marbles and stones directly at the Certosa. Also in 1473 the work of coating and decoration of the façade of the monastery began, for which the Carthusians decided to use, a unique case in the Lombard area, the Carrara marble, then considered of greater value than that of Candoglia and the cost of which was higher than the other materials available in the Ossola area.

By 1476 the Carthusians formed relations with some families of merchants and quarrymen of Carrara, such as the Maffioli, tenants of the quarries of the Marquis Malaspina. The precious marble, after being embarked in Carrara, circumnavigated Italy and arrived by ship at the mouth of the Po, from where it then went up to Pavia. The traffic of Carrara marble towards the Certosa was so voluminous that the Carthusians themselves came to resell it to other Lombard shipyards and in particular to the Veneranda Fabbrica del Duomo di Milano.

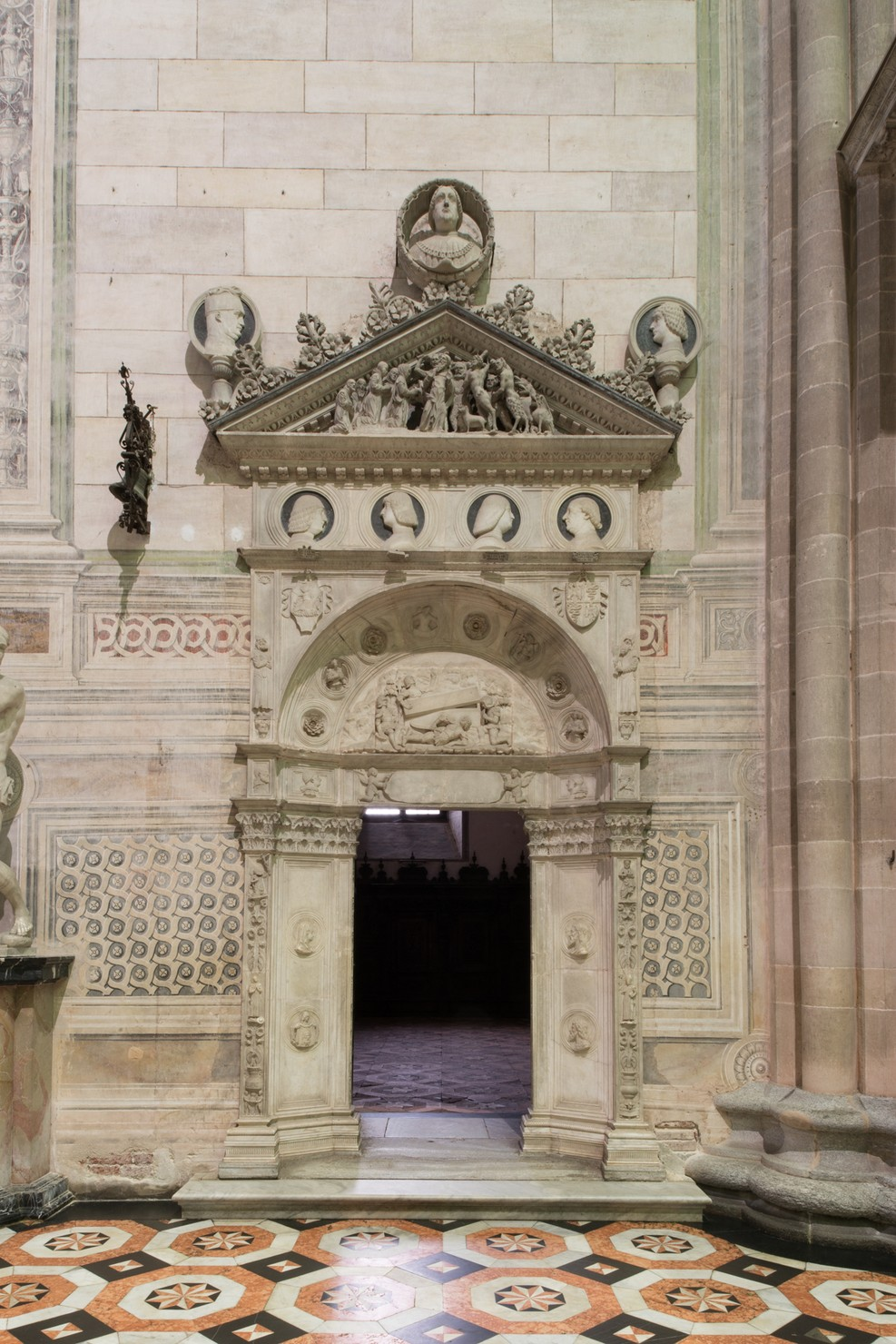
Portal of the sacristy with portraits of the dukes of Milan (1480–90).

However, since the foundation, the Renaissance had spread in Italy, and the rest of the edifice was built according to the new style, redesigned by Giovanni Solari, continued by his son Guiniforte Solari, and including some new cloisters. Solari was followed as director of the works by Giovanni Antonio Amadeo, (1481–1499). The church was consecrated on 3 May 1497. The lower part of the façade was not completed until 1507.

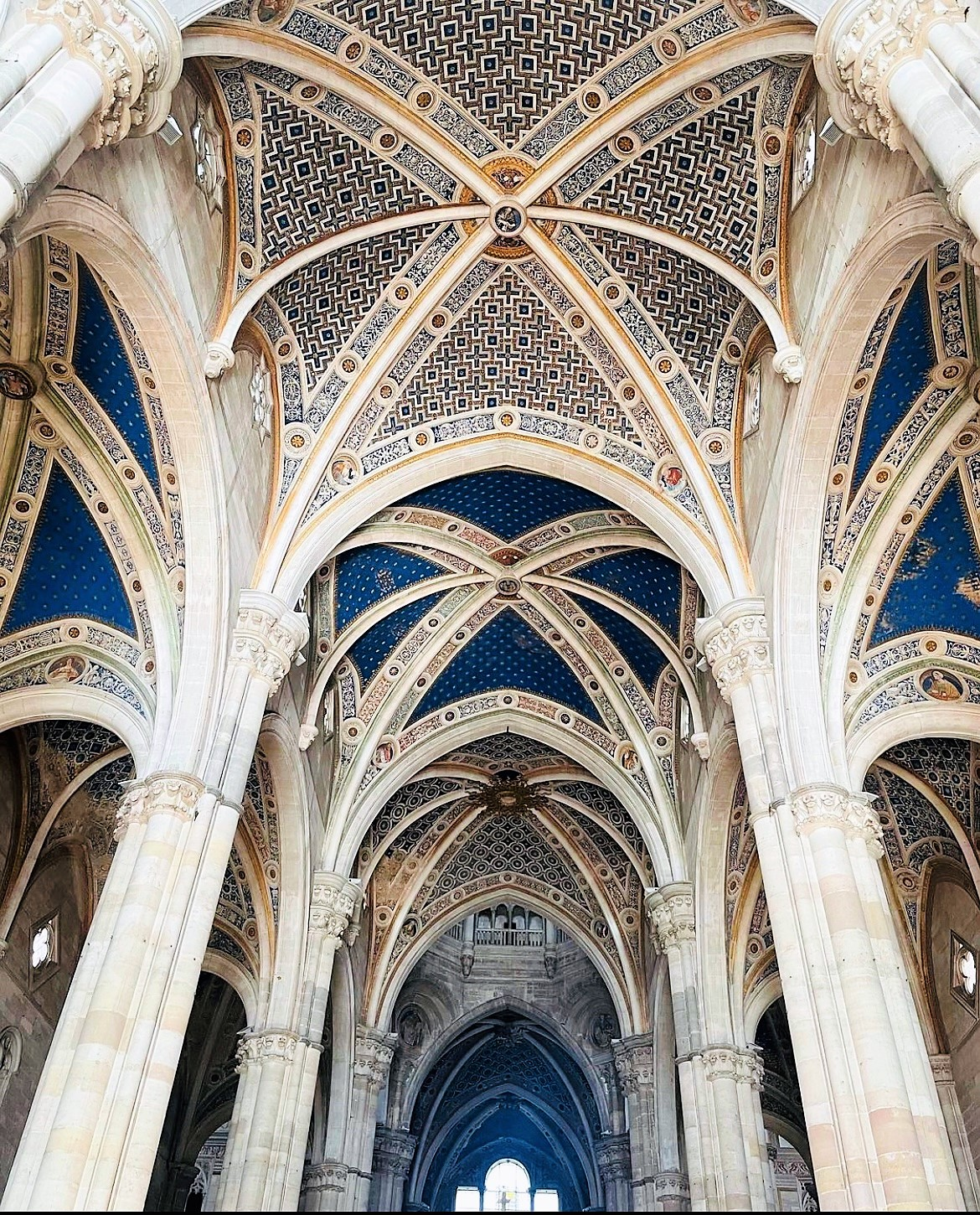
The central nave.

The construction contract obliged the monks to use part of the revenue of the lands held in benefice to the monastery to continue to improve the edifice. Consequently, the Certosa includes a huge collection of artworks of all centuries from the 15th to the 18th.

The Certosa initially only held 12 Carthusian monks, who lived in total cloistered life, and bound by a contract that provided for the use of part of their proceeds (fields, land, income, etc.) for the construction of the monastery itself. In the eighteenth century the monastery was the owner of large estates (in part already donated by Gian Galeazzo and his successors) scattered in the fertile countryside between Pavia and Milan, such as Badile, Battuda, Bernate, Binasco, Boffalora, Borgarello, Carpiano (it was the property of the monks also the castle of Carpiano and the church of San Martino), Carpignano, Milan, Giovenzano, Graffignana, Landriano, Magenta, Marcignago, Opera, Pairana, Pasturago, Quintosole, San Colombano (where they also controlled the castle of San Colombano) Torre del Mangano, Trezzano, Velezzo, Vidigulfo, Vigano Certosino, Vigentino, Villamaggiore, Villanterio, Villareggio and Zeccone, which added up to 2,325 hectares (5,745 acres)of irrigated land.

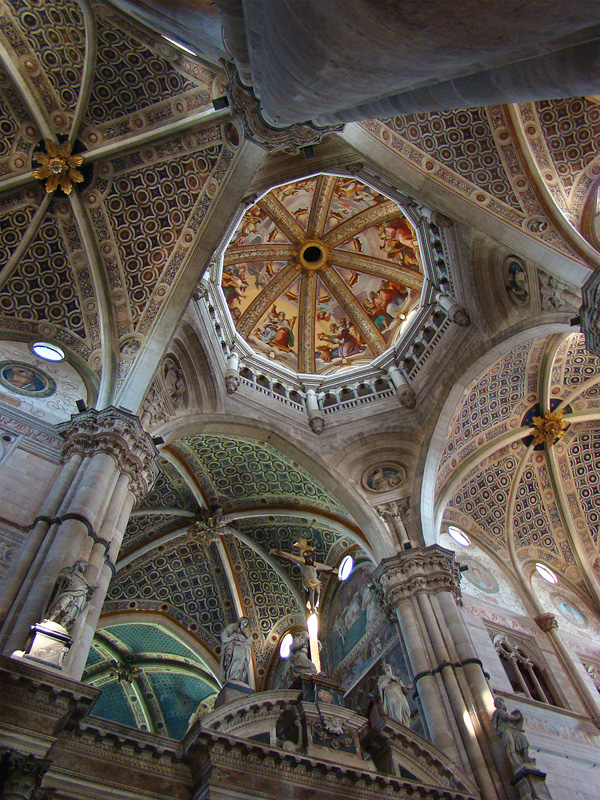
The interior of the church.

In addition, the Certosa also owned a large palace, with a garden and oratory in Milan, in the parish of San Michele alla Chiusa, a palace and the church of Santa Maria d'Ognissanti in Pavia and, from the second half of the 17th century, of a large farm specialized in the production of wine, with a building (called Certosa Cantù), in Casteggio.

In 1560, the Prior General of the Carthusians, a certain Piero Sarde, authorized the installation of suitable equipment for the printing of missals and choirbooks, and on 28 August he invited all the Carthusian monasteries of Italy to supply themselves exclusively with the products of the new printing house (the first book Breviarium Carthusiensis was printed in 1561).

In 1782, the Carthusians were expelled from the Certosa by the Emperor Joseph II of Austria, and replaced in 1784 by the Cistercians and in 1789, by the Carmelites.

In 1796, in retaliation for the revolt in Pavia, the lead covering of the church roof was removed by Napoleon's army, as well as the liturgical silverware and the large canopy, covered with gold flakes and stones precious, used for the Corpus Domini procession. In 1810 the monastery was closed until the Carthusians reacquired it in 1843. In 1866 it was declared a National Monument and sequestrated by the Italian State, although some Benedictines resided there until 1880. The monks currently living in the monastery are Cistercians admitted to it in the 1960s.

In August 1946 the illegally exhumed body of Benito Mussolini was discovered in the complex. Two Franciscan friars were charged with assisting in the concealment of the body.

== The church ==
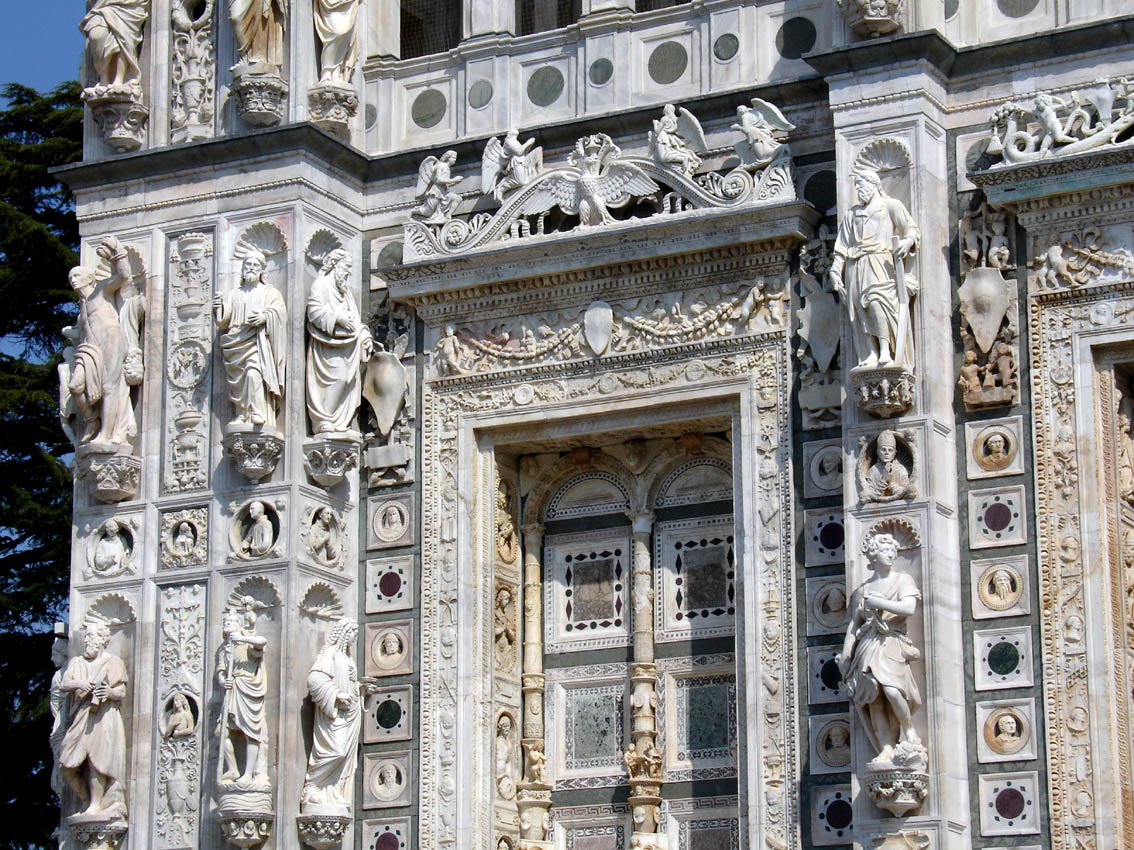
Detail of the façade.

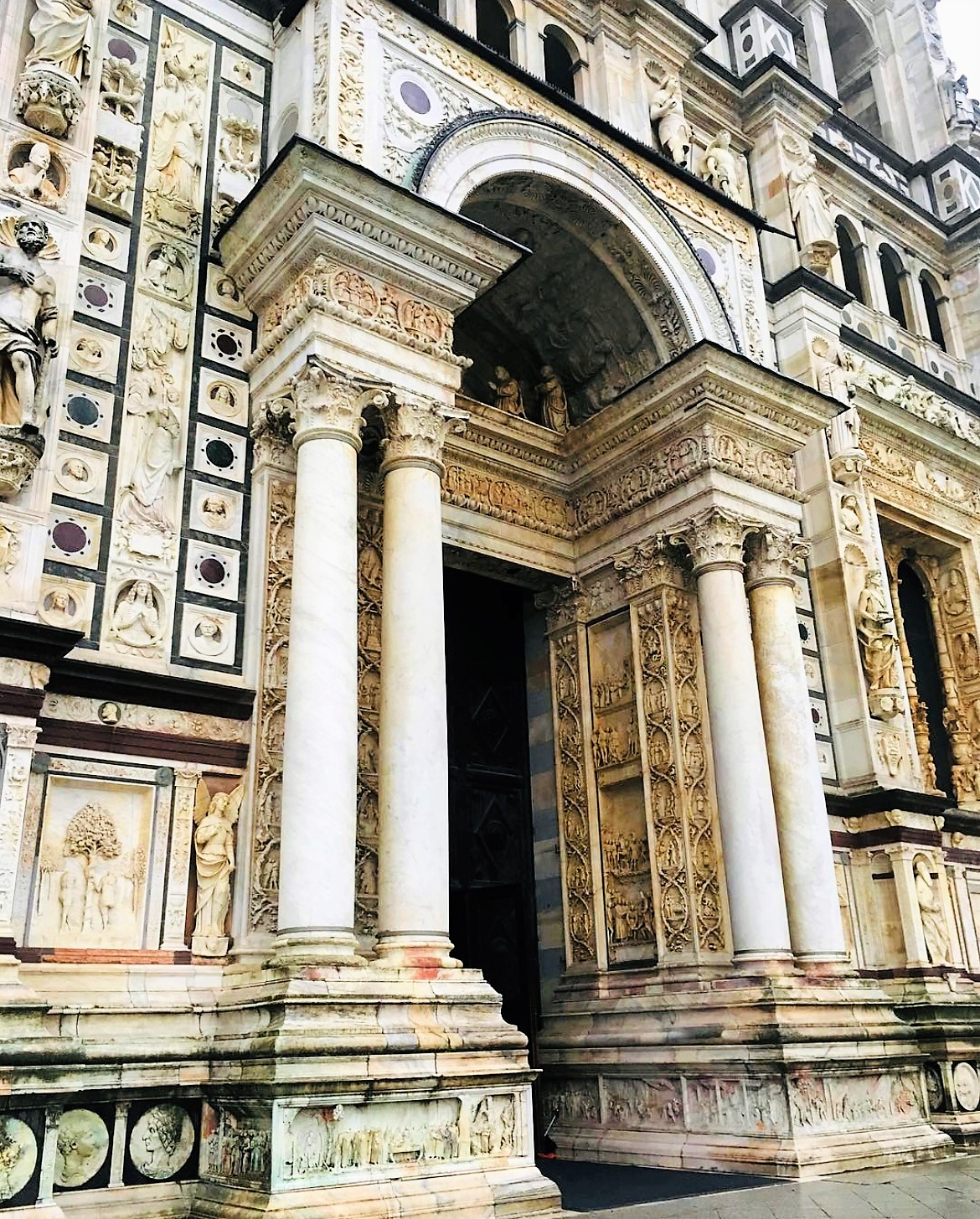
The portal.

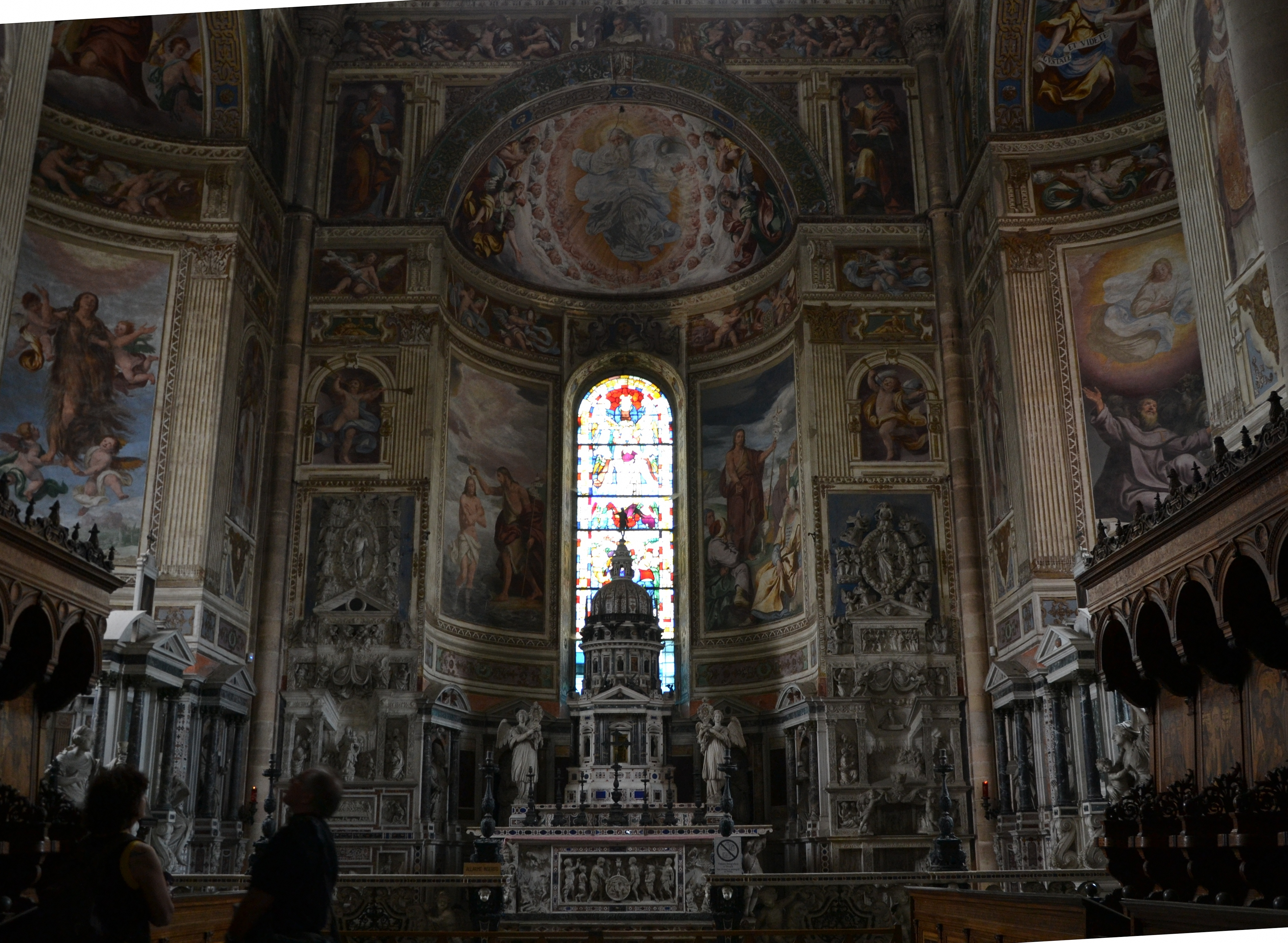
The main altar.

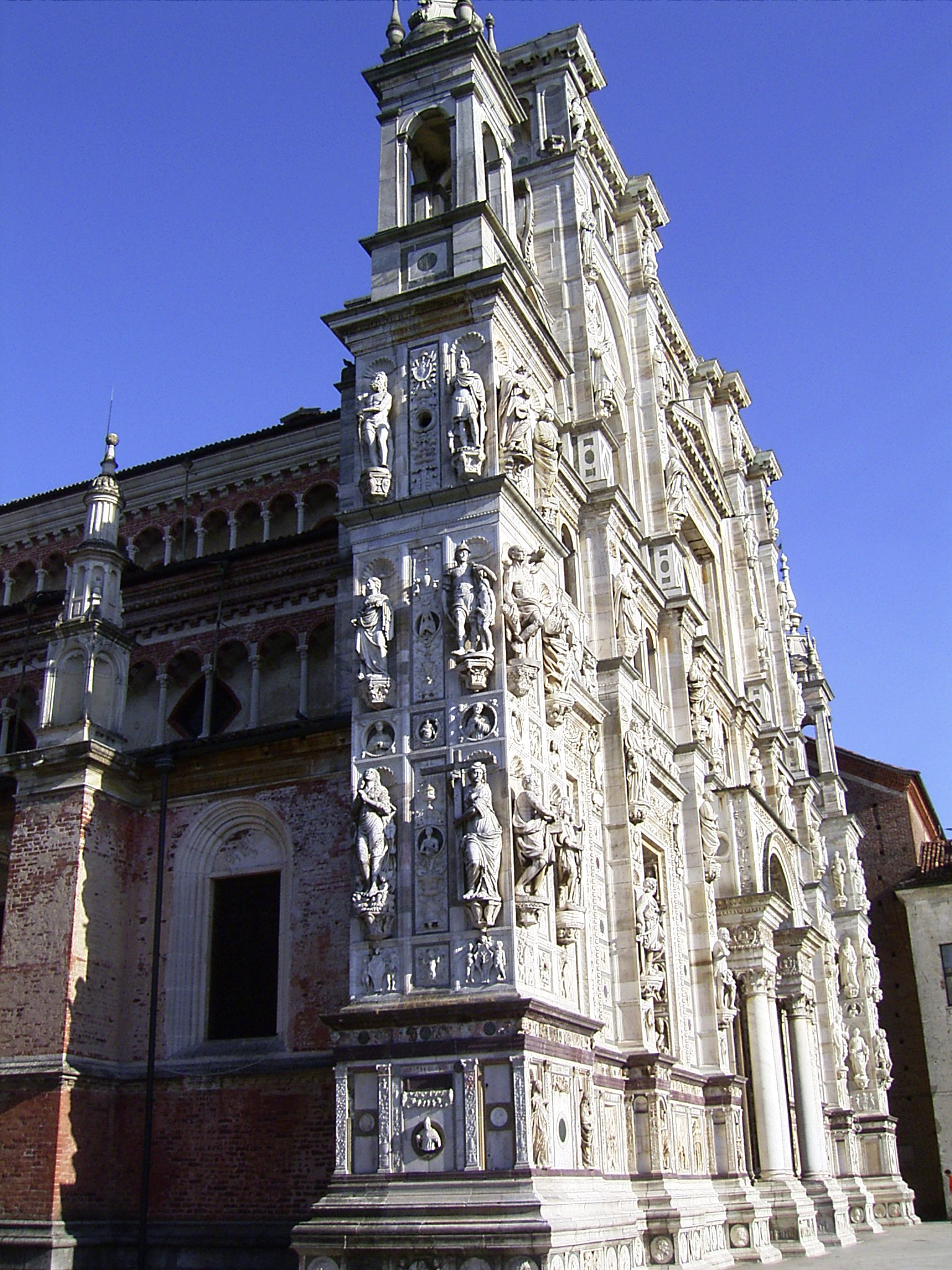
Lateral view of the façade.

Access to the monastic complex is through a Renaissance-era vestibule, frescoed both inside and out. In the faded entrance lunette, two angels hold the coat of arms of the client Gian Galeazzo, with the Visconti snake and the imperial eagle. The upper decoration, drawn by Bernardino de 'Rossi in 1508, is better preserved. Inside, a marble arch with plant motifs bears tondi with the effigies of Gian Galeazzo and Filippo Maria Visconti. On the sides, the saints Christopher and Sebastian by Bernardino Luini, a follower of Leonardo. The whole interior is covered with Renaissance motifs in bright colors and decorated with the GRA-CAR monogram (Gratiarum Chartusia, Charterhouse of Grace). The church is built on a Latin cross plan, with a nave, two aisles and transept, typical of Gothic architecture. The chancel terminates with an apse. It is covered by crossed vaults on Gothic arches and is inspired, on a reduced scale, by the Duomo of Milan. The vaults are alternatively decorated with geometrical shapes and starry skies. The transept and the main chapel end with square-plan chapels with smaller, semi-circular apses on three sides.

The façade of the church is famous for its exuberant decorations, typical of Lombard architecture, every part being decorated with reliefs, inlaid marble and statues. Sculptors who worked on it include Cristoforo Mantegazza and Giovanni Antonio Amadeo himself and Benedetto Briosco. In addition to applied sculpture, the façade itself has a rich sculptural quality because of the contrast between richly textured surfaces, projecting buttresses, horizontal courses and arched openings, some of which are shadowed, while those in the small belfries are open to the sky. The façade, created by superimposing simple rectangles, is loaded with decorations, a typical procedure of Lombard Renaissance architecture and is made of Carrara marble and to a lesser extent Candoglia marble, stone of Varenna, Saltrio stone and Egyptian red porphyry (probably derived from architectural finds from the Roman age).

The sober form of the roughly finished brick front can be seen in a fresco by Ambrogio Bergognone in the apse of the right transept, painted in 1492–1495, when work was commencing on the new façade, portraying Gian Galeazzo Visconti offering the model of the Certosa to the Blessed Virgin. Its profile, with roofs on three levels, has been compared to the churches of Santa Maria del Carmine in Pavia and San Petronio in Bologna; among the architects in close correspondence at all three projects, Borlini ascribes the form of the original façade at the Certosa to Giacomo da Campione, who was working at Pavia while his uncle Matteo was completing San Giovanni in Monza.

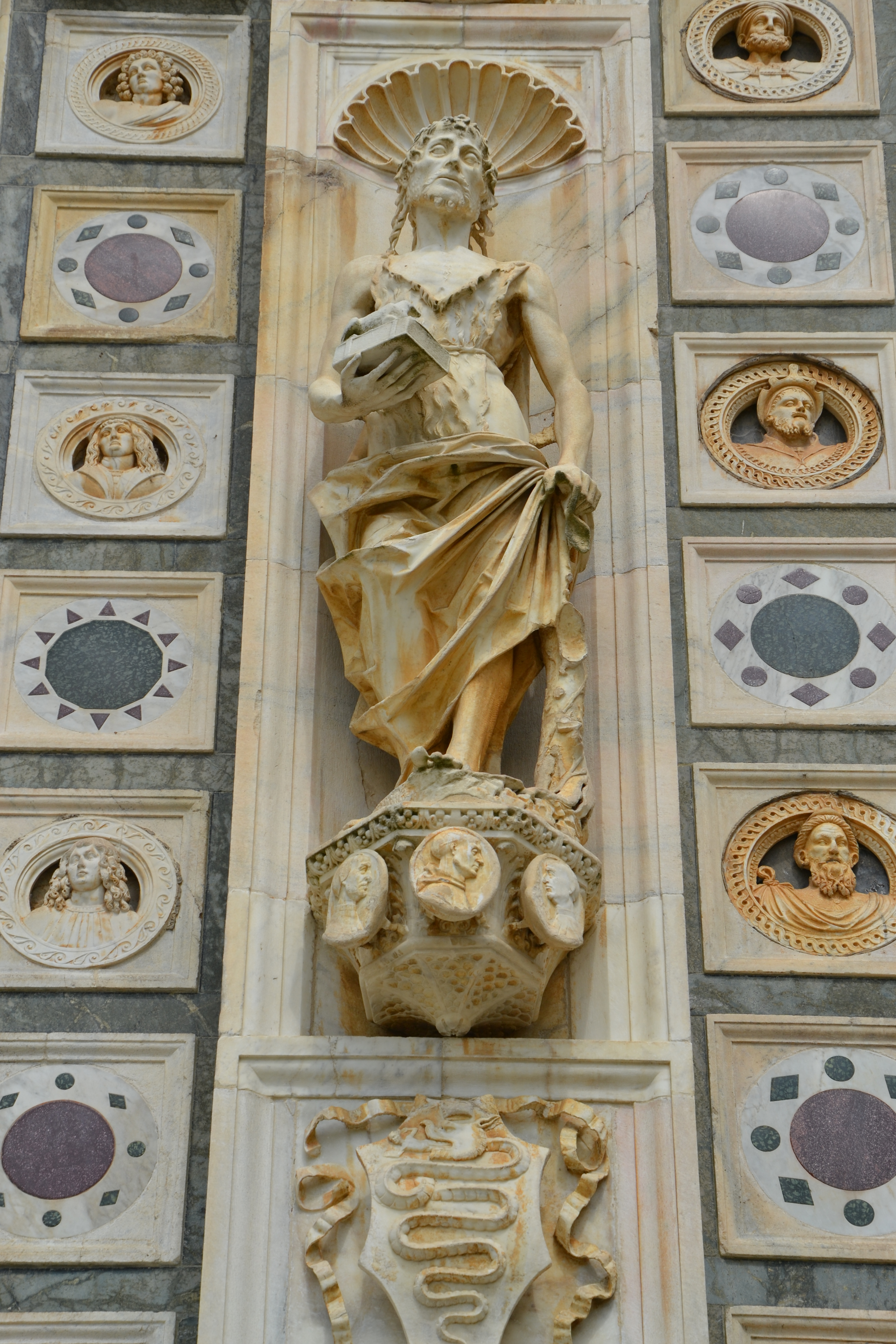
Antonio and Cristoforo Mantegazza, Saint John Baptist, façade.

The architect Giovanni Solari, in building the double row of arcades down the flanks of the church, modified its appearance. After his death he was succeeded in Pavia by his son Guiniforte Solari, but work came to a halt with the death of Guiniforte in 1478.

In 1492 Gian Giacomo Dolcebuono took up the construction, assisted on site, for he was concurrently occupied with the cathedrals at Pavia and at Milan and other churches, by his inseparable collaborator on both cathedrals, Giovanni Antonio Amadeo. In their hands the project was thoroughly redesigned. Scores of artists were involved. The classicist style portal is by Benedetto Briosco (1501). The porch has a large arch of classicist form resting on paired Corinthian columns which are each surmounted by a very strongly modelled cornice on which the arch rests, the construction being derived from the Classical, used by Brunelleschi, and employed here for a bold and striking effect. The decoration is of bas-reliefs illustrating the History of the Certosa. Above the central arch is a shallow balcony of three arches, above which rises the central window.

This campaign was interrupted in 1519 as work was going forward by the condition of French occupation in Lombardy after the War of the League of Cambrai. French troops were encamped round the Certosa. Notations of work on the façade did not resume until 1554, when a revised design under the direction of Cristoforo Lombardo was approved for the completion of the façade above the second arcade; there marble intarsia was substituted for the rich sculptural decorations of the lower area. Some final details were added by Galeazzo Alessi.

== Paintings ==
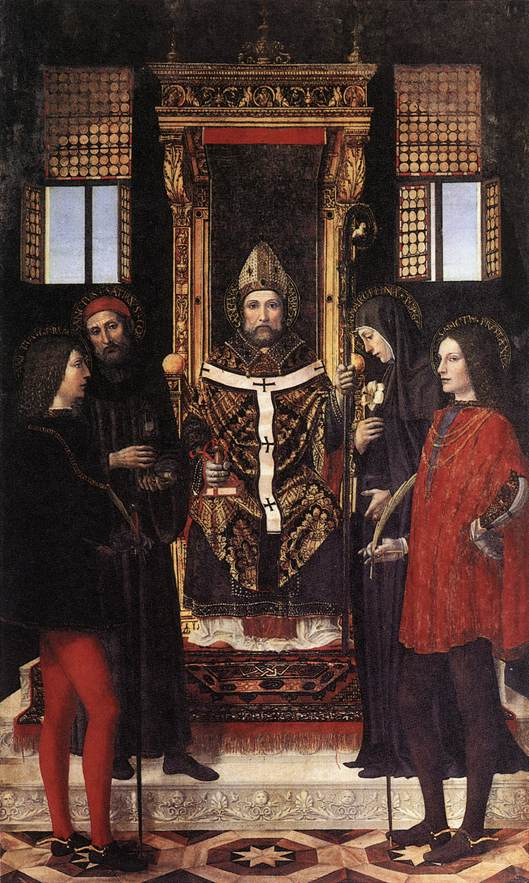
Panel of St. Ambrose by Ambrogio Bergognone

The frescoes that adorn the walls and vaults of the transept are due, as has been said, to Ambrogio Bergognone assisted by a group of unknown masters, including the very young Bernardo Zenale. A strong imprint of Bramante emerges from these works, in the balance of the proportions and the precision of the perspectives. In the right apse of the transept, Bergognone's fresco with Gian Galeazzo Visconti presents the Virgin with the model of the Charterhouse, between Filippo Maria Visconti, Galeazzo Maria Sforza and Gian Galeazzo Sforza, made between 1490–1495, while the apse on the left represents the coronation of Mary between Francesco Sforza and Ludovico Sforza, with which the latter wanted to celebrate his dynastic succession, obtained not without controversy after the death of his nephew Gian Galeazzo Sforza. The two altarpieces facing each other at opposite ends of the transept are Giovanni Battista Crespi's Baroque masterpieces, the Madonna and ss. Charles and Hugues de Grenoble painted in 1617–18, as well as the Madonna and Saint Bruno.

The Certosa has painted masterpieces by Bergognone including the panels of St. Ambrose (1490), and San Siro (1491) and, most significantly, the Crucifixion (1490). Other works by Bergognone are now found in other museums of Europe.

The second chapel on the left houses the famous Altarpiece by Pietro Perugino, commissioned by Duke Ludovico Sforza from the famous Umbrian painter in 1496. It develops over two floors: above the Eternal Father, below the three tables with the Archangel Michael, the Adoration of the Child and St. Raphael and Tobias. The Eternal Father alone is original by Perugino; the lower plates were given in 1856 to the National Gallery in London. In place of the two tables scattered on either side of the Eternal Father, the two panels with the Doctors of the Church by Bergognone were inserted at the top, made for another Altarpiece of the Certosa which was subsequently dismembered. The altar frontal, in semi-precious stones and polychrome marble, is the work of Tommaso Orsolino from 1648. The chapel houses a wooden relic of the True Cross.

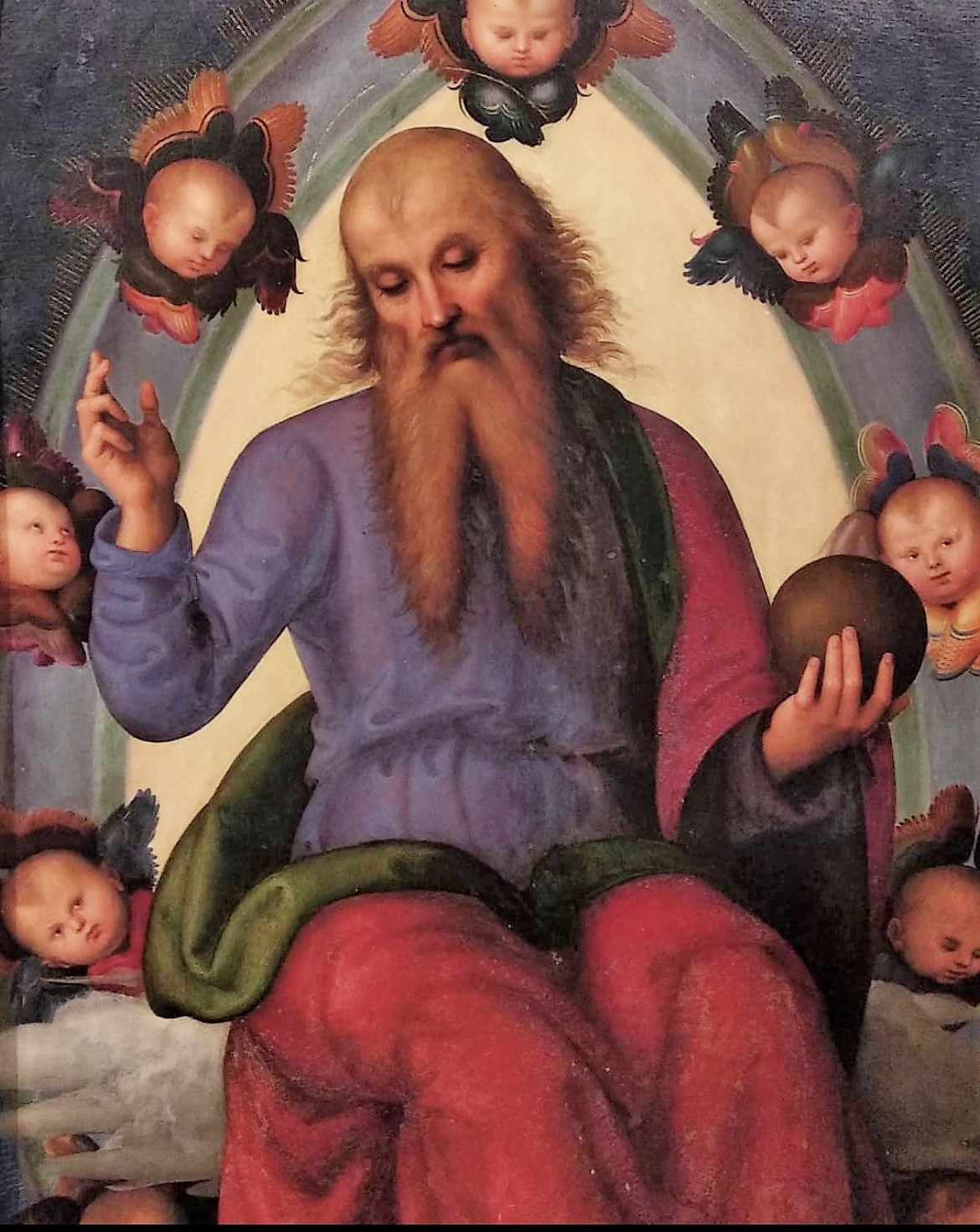
Perugino, God the Father blessing, upper panel of the Certosa di Pavia Altarpiece (1496).

Other paintings in the church include a Holy Father, panels by Giovanni Battista Crespi, Il Morazzone, Guercino, Francesco Cairo and Daniele Crespi, and a remnant of a polyptych by Perugino. Originally depicting the Madonna and Saints, it is now disassembled and scattered among museums: the only portion in the Certosa is God the Father with cherubim. An Annunciation has disappeared; three panels, the Virgin Adoring the Infant Christ, St. Michael and St. Raphael with Tobias are on display at the National Gallery of London, in the United Kingdom.

In the southern transept is the tomb of Gian Galeazzo Visconti, begun in 1494–1497 by Giovanni Cristoforo Romano and Benedetto Briosco, but completed only in 1562. The northern transept houses the tomb of Ludovico Sforza, 7th Duke of Milan, and his wife Beatrice d'Este. The sculptures on the tomb were carried here in 1564 from the Milanese church of Santa Maria delle Grazie, the statues generally being considered the masterwork of Cristoforo Solari.

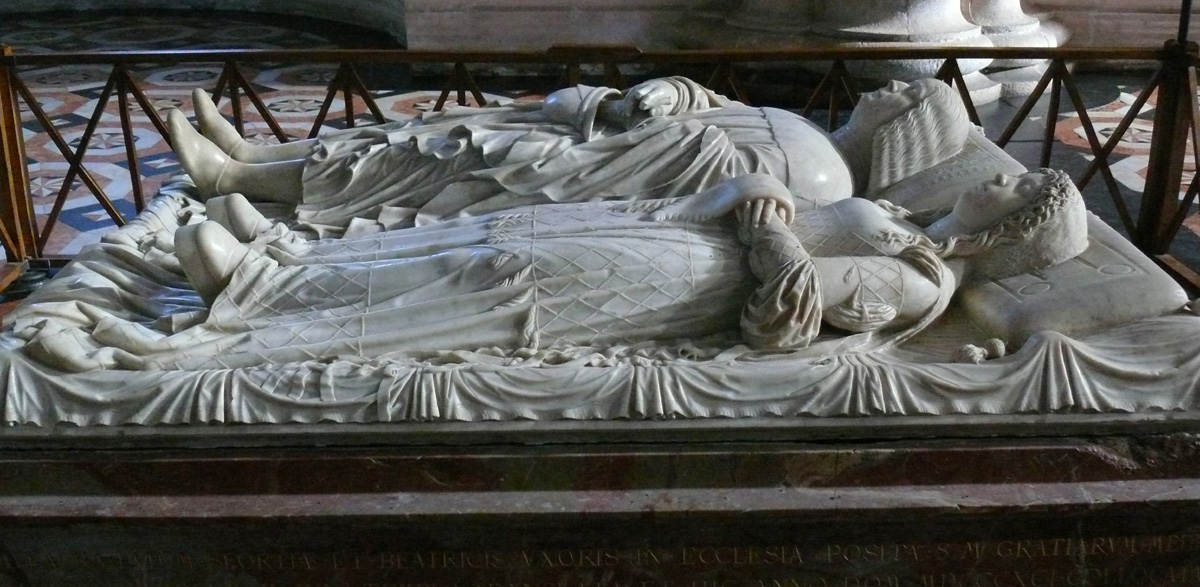
Cristoforo Solari, tomb of Ludovico Sforza and Beatrice d'Este.

In the Cappella di San Michele (St Michael's Chapel) are frescoes by Carlo Francesco Nuvolone. The first chapel on the left is in Baroque style. The altarpiece with Mary Magdalene at Christ's feet is by Giuseppe Peroni from Parma (1757), while the fresco decoration is by Federico Bianchi, a pupil of Ercole Procaccini (1663). The altar is made of Egyptian granite, bronze, semi-precious stones and polychrome marble and is the work of Carlo Sacchi. The third chapel, dedicated to St. John the Baptist, to whom the cycle of frescoes by the Genoese Giovan Battista Carlone is dedicated. The fourth chapel, whose altar is equipped with alabaster columns, preserves a frontal with the Massacre of the Innocents, by Dionigi Bussola from 1677, while the altarpiece by the Cremonese painter Pietro Martire Neri (1640–41) depicts the Adoration of the Magi . The chapel preserves two frescoes: Madonna with Child and Saint Jerome by Ambrogio da Fossano. In the fifth chapel, the Altarpiece by Francesco Cairo (inserted in a rich baroque altar in alabaster and polychrome marble), represents Saint Catherine of Siena together with her homonymous Saint Catherine of Alexandria. The chapel is illuminated by a large window, with a stained glass window made around 1485 by an anonymous Lombard master on a cartoon by Vincenzo Foppa depicting Saint Catherine of Alexandria.

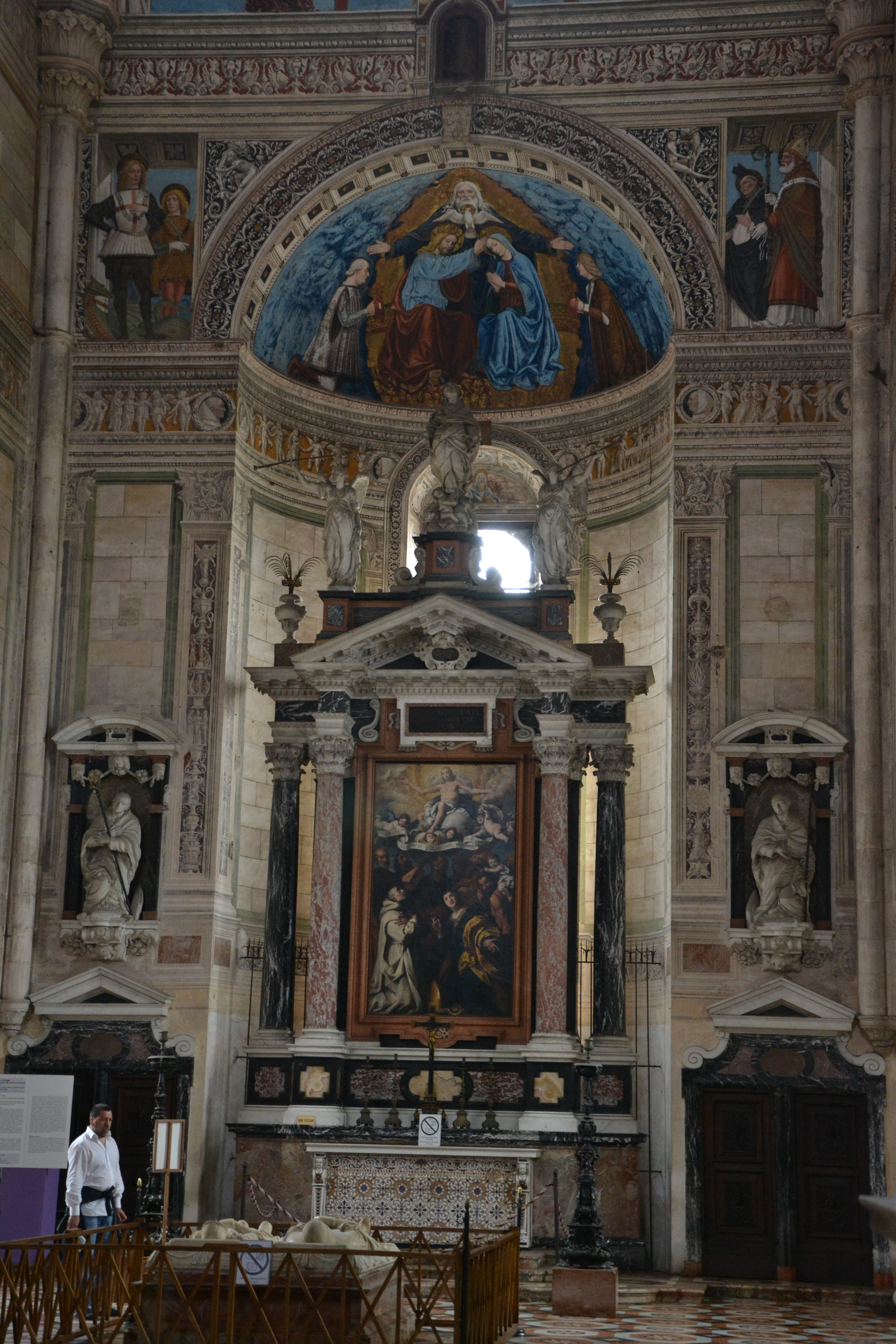
Bergognone, Coronation of the Virgin between Francesco Sforza, Ludovico Sforza and Saints Fortunatus, George and Peter of Verona (apsidal basin), below, altarpiece by Giovanni Battista Crespi.

The sixth chapel on the right houses the Madonna and Child with Saints Peter and Paul, a Baroque masterpiece by Guercino. The seventh chapel on the left preserves an altarpiece depicting the Virgin of the Rosary, a masterpiece by the Milanese Baroque master Pier Francesco Mazzucchelli, painter in the service of Cardinal Federico Borromeo, who creates a work of refined elegance in delicate tones, in the elongated shapes and in the sweet expressions of the characters. The second chapel on the right houses another Renaissance masterpiece commissioned by Ludovico Sforza: the polyptych with the Madonna and Saints Hugh of Langres and Hugh of Canterbury by Macrino d'Alba made in 1496. If the chancel vault still features Renaissance frescoes, the vast cycle of frescoes that covers the chancel walls was commissioned in 1630 from Daniele Crespi. It is a composite cycle, with scenes drawn from the New Testament, hagiographies of Carthusian and other saints, skilfully inserted into Gothic architecture through a complex system of decorative squares, framing large sacred scenes and smaller panels with isolated figures of evangelists, doctors of the Church, prophets, sibyls, Carthusians and blessed saints. The dome was frescoed in 1599 by Pietro Sorri and Alessandro Casolani with the figures of God the Father with the Lamb and the Kings of the Apocalypse.

== Stained glass and other works ==
The Certosa possesses an important collection of stained glass windows, executed to cartoons by masters active in Lombardy in the 15th century, including Zanetto Bugatto, Vincenzo Foppa, Bergognone and Hans Witz.

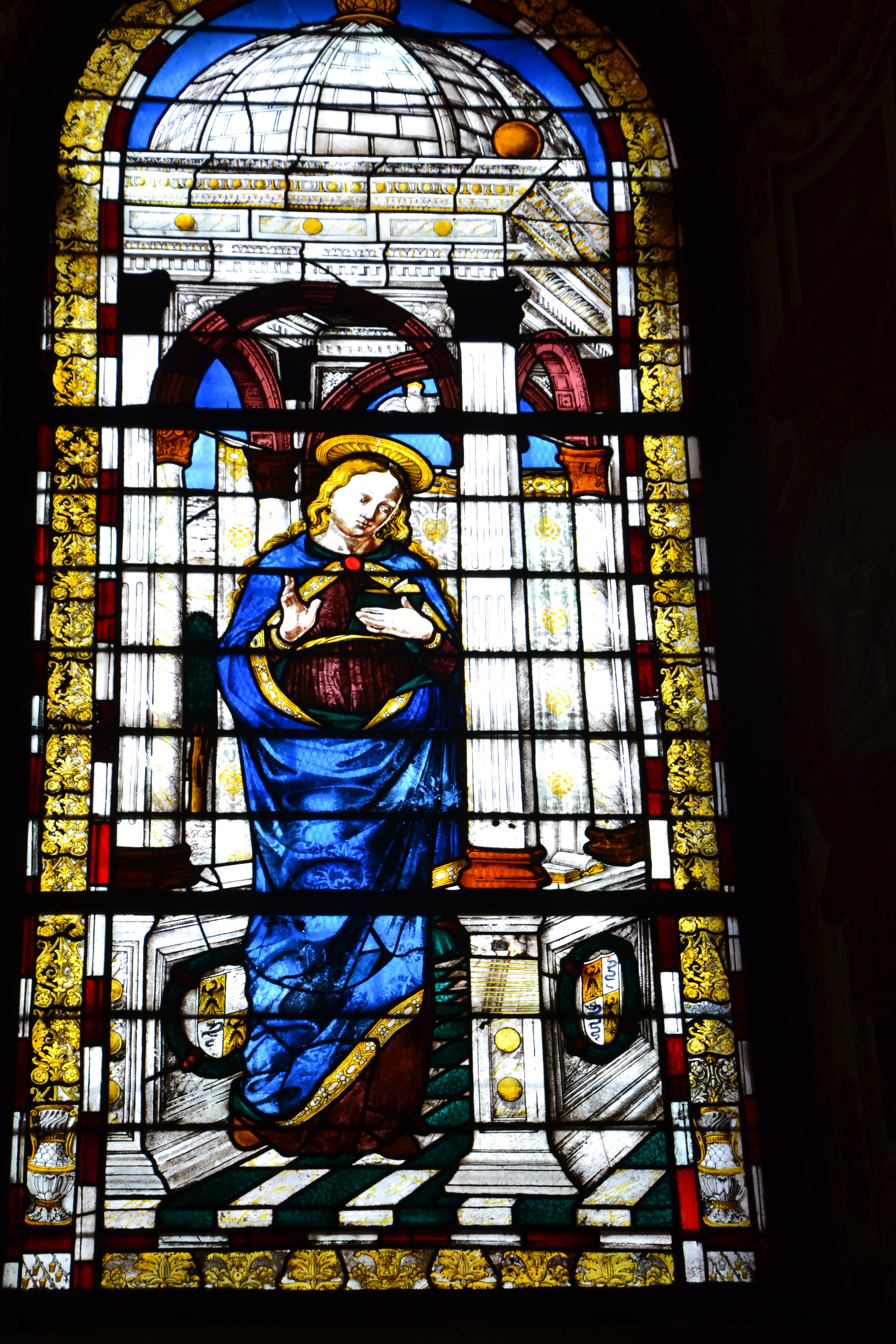
Vincenzo Foppa, Madonna, about 1475–1480.

In the presbytery there is the large Renaissance carved wooden choir, commissioned by Ludovico il Moro. It is remarkable both from the point of view of the inlay, and for the quality of the designs from which the inlays were taken, probably produced by the same artists who created the pictorial decorations such as Bergognone and Zenale. The 42 dossals depict saints or biblical characters, each of which shows architectural or natural scenarios with elaborate and imaginative Renaissance-style constructions. The execution was entrusted by the Duke in 1486 to Bartolomeo de Polli, a Modenese already active at the court of Mantua, and completed by the Cremonese inlayer Pantaleone de Marchi, in time for the consecration of the church, which took place in 1497.

The great high altar is surmounted by a colossal ciborium in the form of a temple with a central plan with a large dome, built in Carrara marble, with inserts in polychrome marble and precious stones such as lapis lazuli, carnelian, jasper and onyx, and bronze finishes. It was built in 1568 by the sculptor Ambrogio Volpi. The small temple of this altar is enriched by thirteen bronze statuettes by Angelo Marini. The altar cross, the candelabra and the large candlestick (2.03 meters high) are by Annibale Fontana.

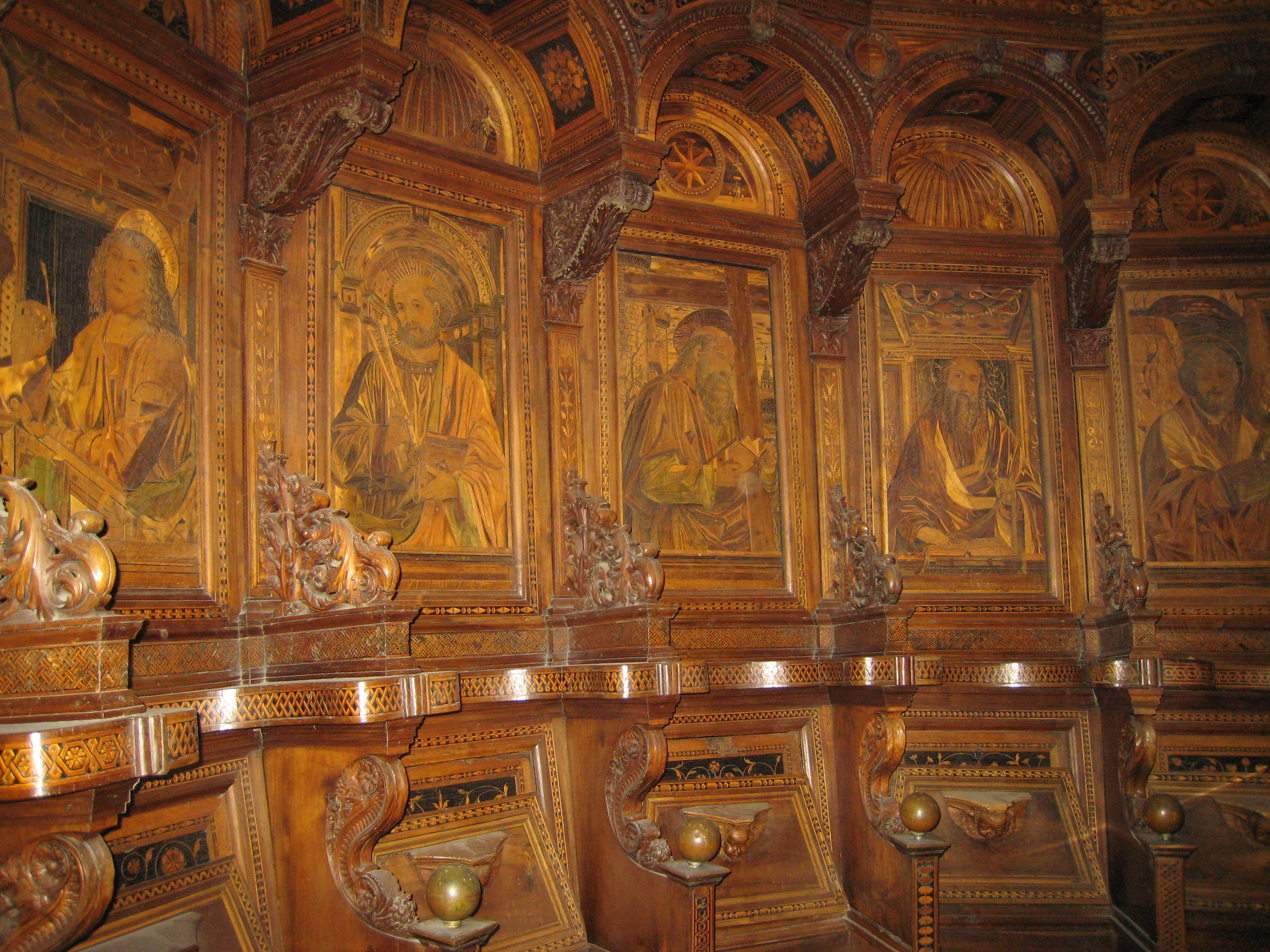
Detail of the wooden choir, 1497.

The sacristy contains, among other treasures, a triptych in ivory and hippopotamus' ivory by the Embriachi workshop run by Baldassarre degli Embriachi, originally placed in the suite of rooms used by Gian Galeazzo Visconti on his visits. This is one of only three very large pieces by the workshop, who mostly made much smaller marriage caskets. The work, a late Gothic carving masterpiece, measures 2.45 meters at the base for a maximum height, including the pinnacles, of 2.54 meters. It is composed of minute compositions and adorned with small tabernacles with statuettes of saints inside; in the central compartment there are 26 panels illustrating the legend of the Magi according to the apocryphal gospels; in the compartment on the right and on the left, 36 bas-reliefs (18 on each side) depict episodes from the life of Christ and the Virgin. In the median cusp, inside a tondo supported by angels, the figure of God dominates, while the base of the triptych presents a piety, flanked by 14 aedicules with as many statuettes of saints. There are also two external polygonal pillars made up of 40 small tabernacles adorned with statuettes.

== The new sacristy ==
It is accessed through the bottom of the right transept, and was decorated in the Baroque period. Originally, the room, built in 1425, housed the chapter and the library of the monastery and was only transformed into a sacristy at the end of the 16th century.

The single large rectangular room was frescoed in 1600 by the Sienese painter Pietro Sorri, who, inspired by Michelangelo's Sistine Chapel, covered the great vault with biblical episodes, monumental figures of prophets in niches, and graceful cherubs revolving in goblets. Compared to the Roman model, however, Sorri's work conveys playfulness and lightness to the viewer through the use of bright, clear chromatic chords and the sumptuousness of settings and settings. The wooden cabinets, adorned with statuettes attributed to Annibale Fontana, are a remarkable work of sculpture. On the altar, the triptych of the Assumption is by Andrea Solario, one of the main representatives of the Leonardesque school that flourished in Milan after the master's departure.

== The Small and Grand Cloisters ==
An elegant portal, with sculptures by the Mantegazza brothers and Giovanni Antonio Amadeo, leads from the church to the Small Cloister (in Italian: Chiostro Piccolo.) This has a small garden in the center. The most striking feature is the terracotta decoration of the small pilasters, executed by Rinaldo de Stauris between 1463 and 1478. Some arcades are decorated by frescoes by Daniele Crespi, now partially ruined. Also noteworthy is the late-14th century lavabo in stone and terracotta, with scenes of the Jesus with the Woman of Samaria at the Well.

Similar decorations also characterize the Grand Cloister (Italian: Chiostro Grande), which measures c.125x100 meters. The elegant cells of the monks open to the central garden. The arcades have columns with precious decorations in terracotta, with tondos portraying saints, prophets and angels, alternatively in white and pink Verona marble. There were once also paintings by Vincenzo Foppa, now disappeared.

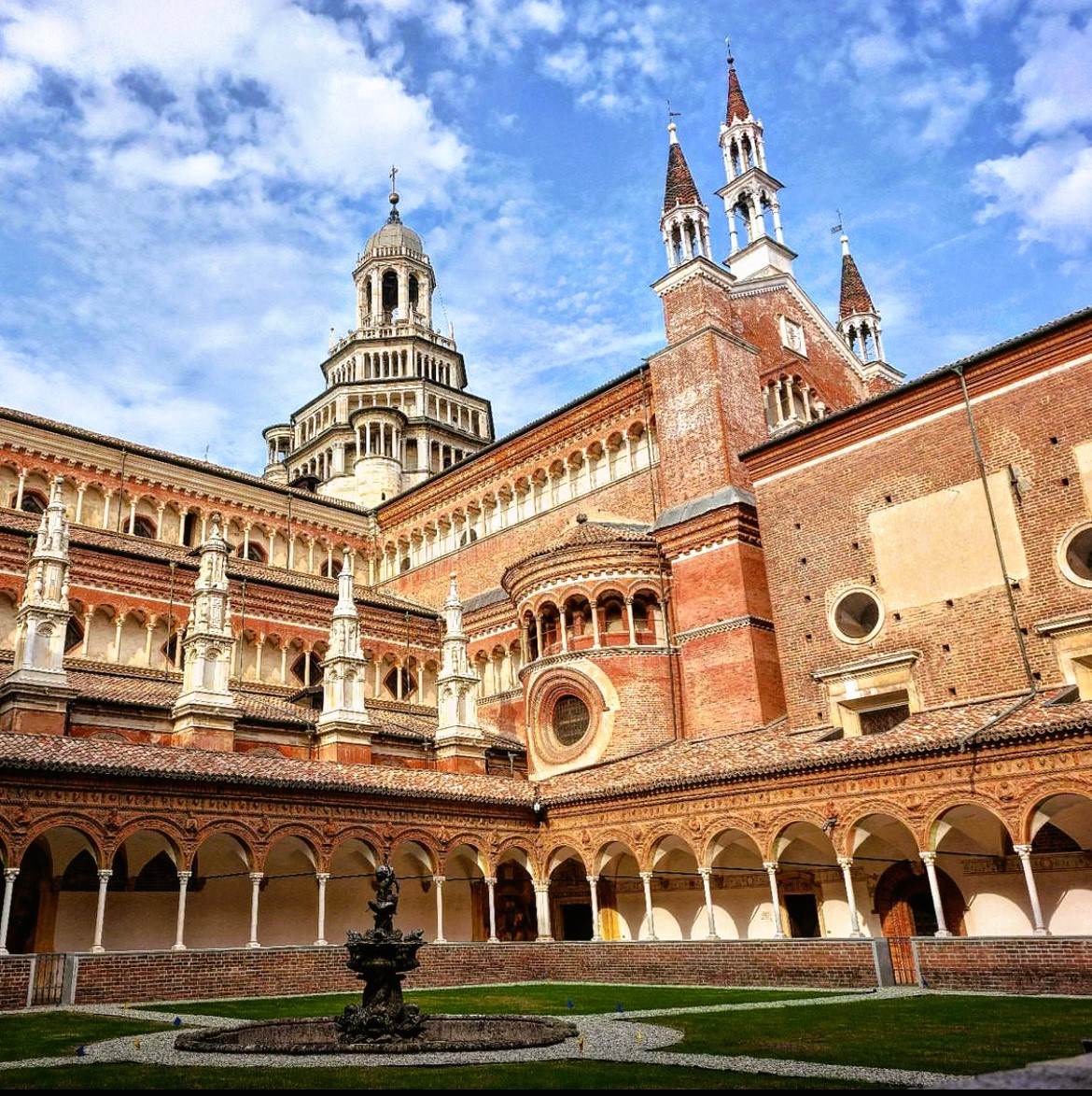
The Certosa di Pavia as seen from the Small Cloister.

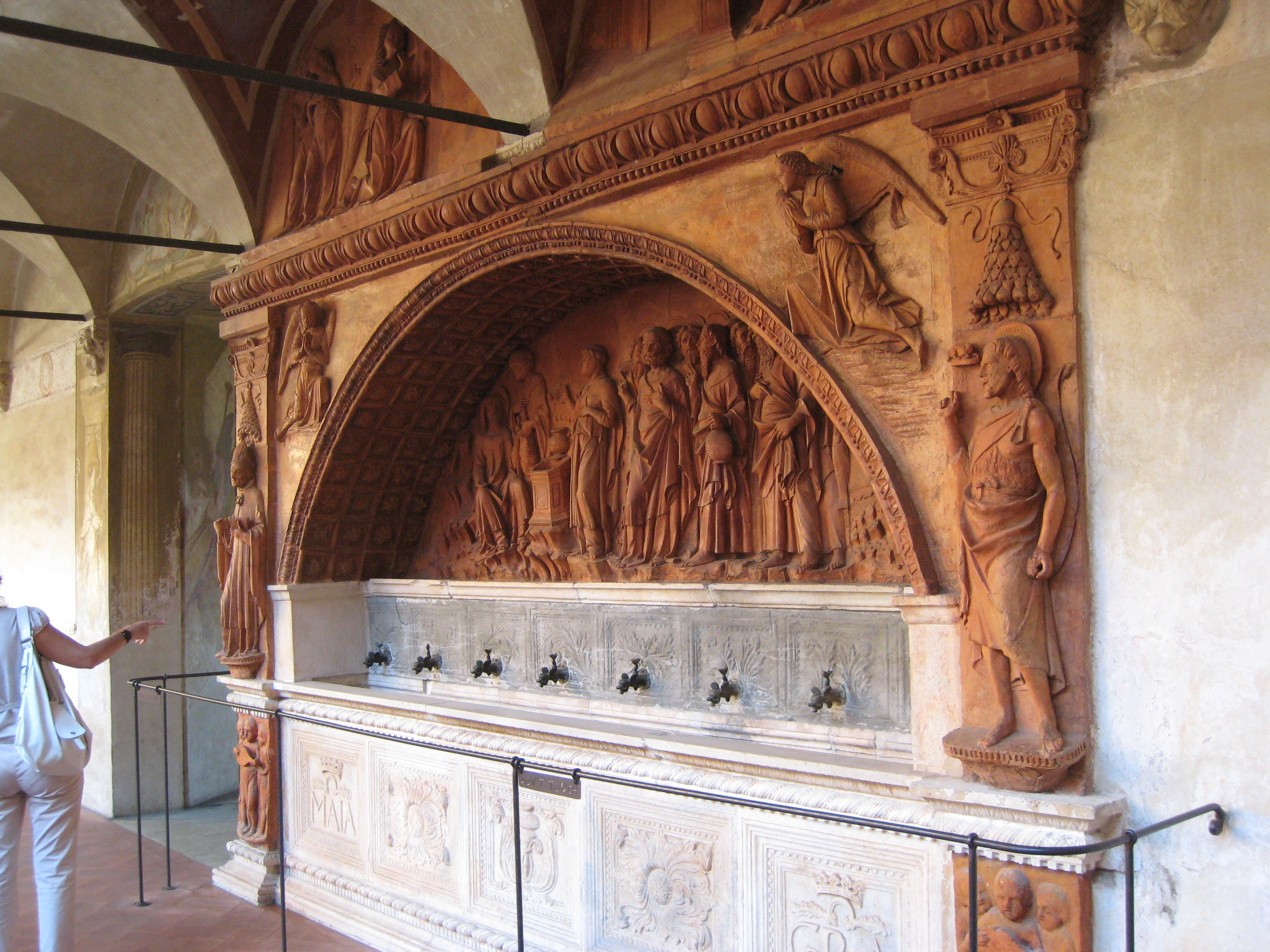
The washbasin of the small cloister (about 1450–1475).

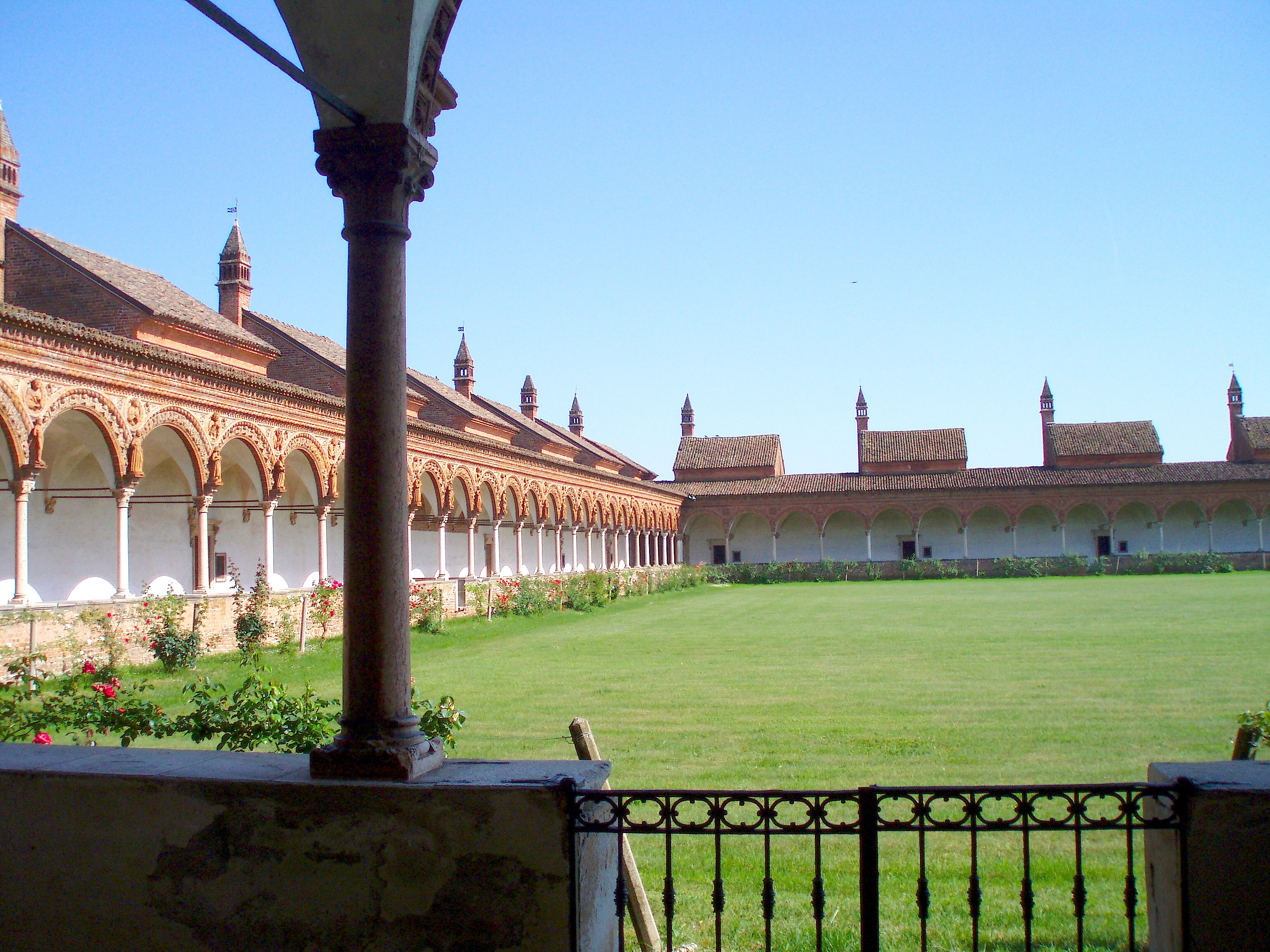
The Grand Cloister.

== Library ==
Since its foundation, the monks had a library, including liturgical texts necessary for daily celebrations, and others, of scientific and humanistic subjects. We know that a first library was set up between 1426 and 1427, but at the end of the sixteenth century its premises were used as a sacristy and constituted the new sacristy of the church and the library was moved to its current smaller location, located on the shorter side of the cloister, where the monastery's infirmary used to be. The library was implemented by the prior Matteo Valerio in the first half of the seventeenth century, who also enriched it with secular texts and manuscripts.

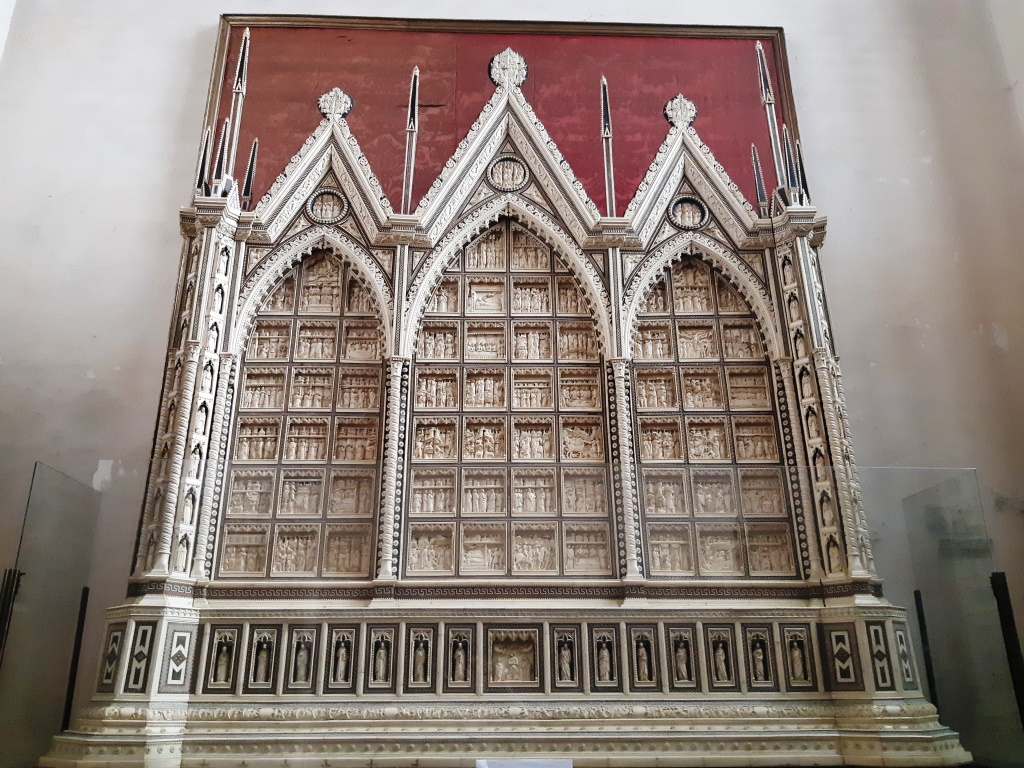
The triptych in ivory by the Embriachi workshop, 1400–1409.

In 1782, with the suppression of the Certosa, its important catalogue was partly divided between the Libraries of Milan and Pavia, even if some volumes were dispersed. There remained in the library of the monastery 13 illuminated choirbooks by Evangelista della Croce, Benedetto da Corteregia of Bergamo, Vallombrosian monk of the monastery of San Lanfranco, and Guarnerio Beretta dating back to the 16th century, with texts and music of the songs of the masses ordered according to the sequence of the year liturgical.

== Refectory ==
The refectory was one of the first rooms to be built and during the first years of construction it was used as a church, being a very large rectangular room, as indicated in the progress of the works drawn up in 1451 at the request of Francesco Sforza. On the west wall of the hall is a small fresco, the oldest in the monastery, in the late Gothic style depicting a Madonna and Child by Zavattari. The lowered vault has the oldest decoration, including a Madonna and Child and Prophets in Spectacles attributed to Ambrogio da Fossano, while in the center is the sun or radiant ray, emblem of the Visconti dynasty. The marble pulpit was carved in the early 16th century with the classical arch and statuary balustrade. From there, readings were taken during meals. In 1567, Ottavio Semini crafted the fresco of the Last Supper.

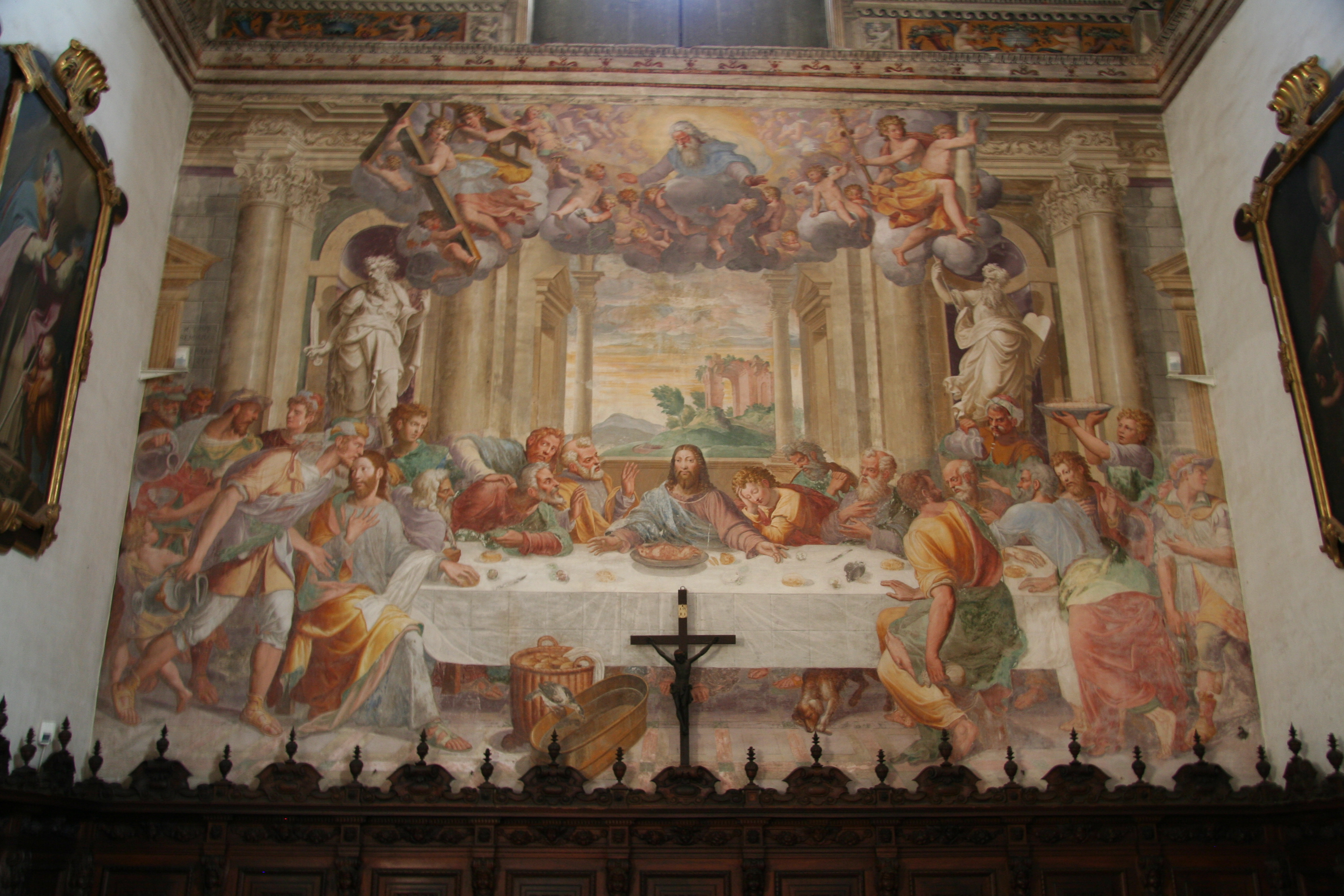
Ottavio Semino, The Last Supper (1567).

== The museum of the Certosa of Pavia ==
The museum of the Certosa of Pavia is located in the rooms of the Ducal Palace, the summer residence of the Visconti and Sforza dynasty then used as a guesthouse. The building, modified in 1625 by an intervention on the facade by the architect Francesco Maria Richini, has a linear succession of windows between semi-columns that give brightness to the entire structure. It houses works from the monastic complex or connected to it. The gallery on the ground floor, the recently refurbished plaster cast gallery, houses more than 200 large and small scale casts.

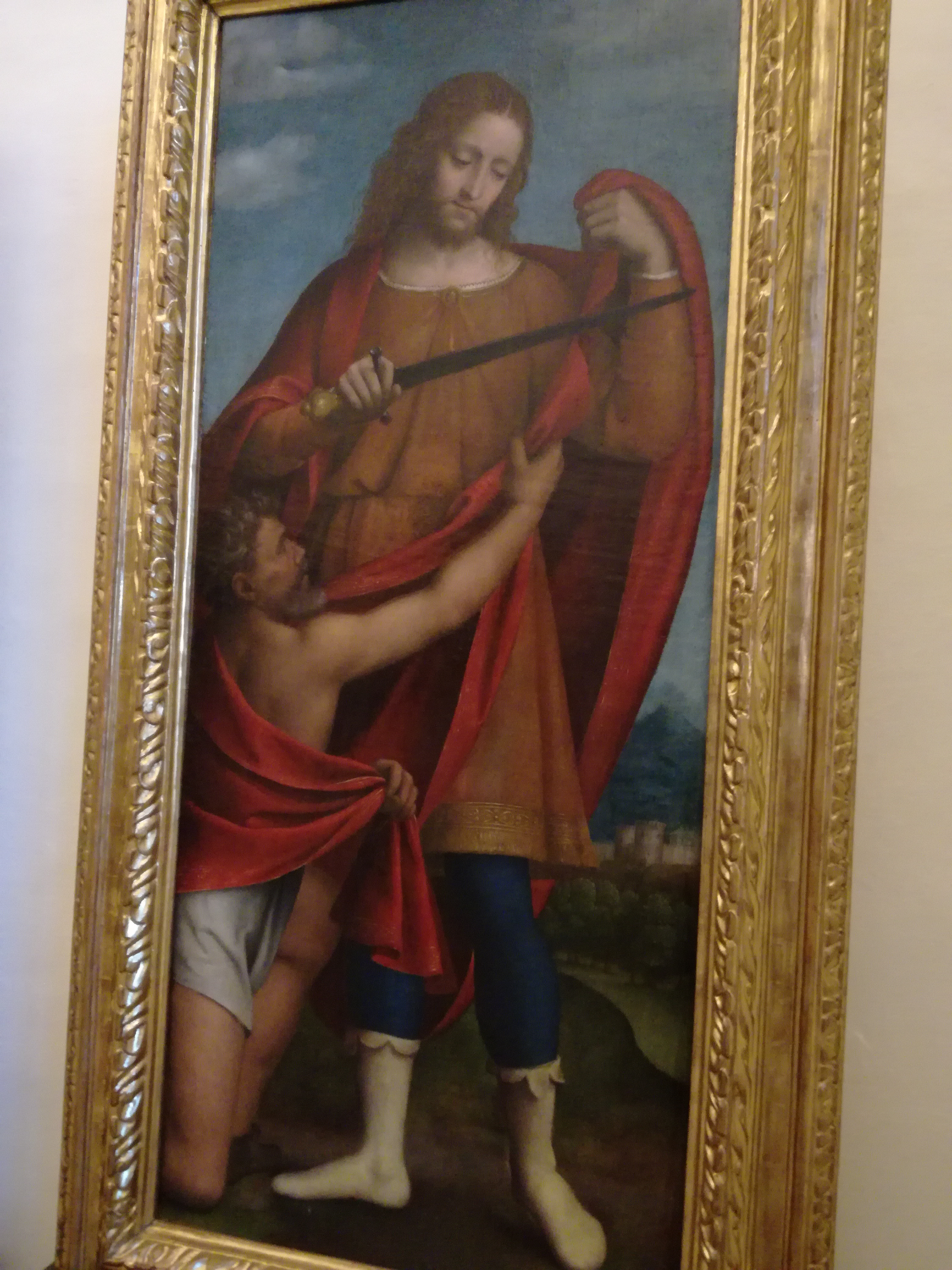
Bernardino Luini, Saint Martin.

The gipsoteca collects more than 200 large and small scale casts and some sculptures, including the lamented Christ by Antonio della Porta (early 16th century. In the years from 2002 to 2006, most of these casts were restored and placed, with a new layout by the Superintendence for Architectural and Landscape Heritage of Lombardy, in the ground floor gallery of the Ducal Palace. Upstairs, the historical setting of 1911 by Luca Beltrami has been maintained and, except for some adjustments, the extraordinary high-reliefs in marble by Bambaia, the sculptures, dating back to around 1480, by Giovanni Antonio Amadeo and Antonio Mantegazza are preserved. Here are also preserved polychrome stone sculptures by Lombard artists of the second half of the fifteenth century, wall paintings of the sixteenth century detached from their original locations, panel paintings, such as the Altarpiece by Bartolomeo Montagna, the Ecce homo by Bramantino, Saint Martin and Saint Ambrose by Bernardino Luini. There are also other paintings on canvas by Guglielmo Caccia, by Vincenzo Campi, by Giovanni Agostino da Lodi, by Giuseppe Procaccini, by Stefano Maria Legnani, by Giuseppe Vermiglio.

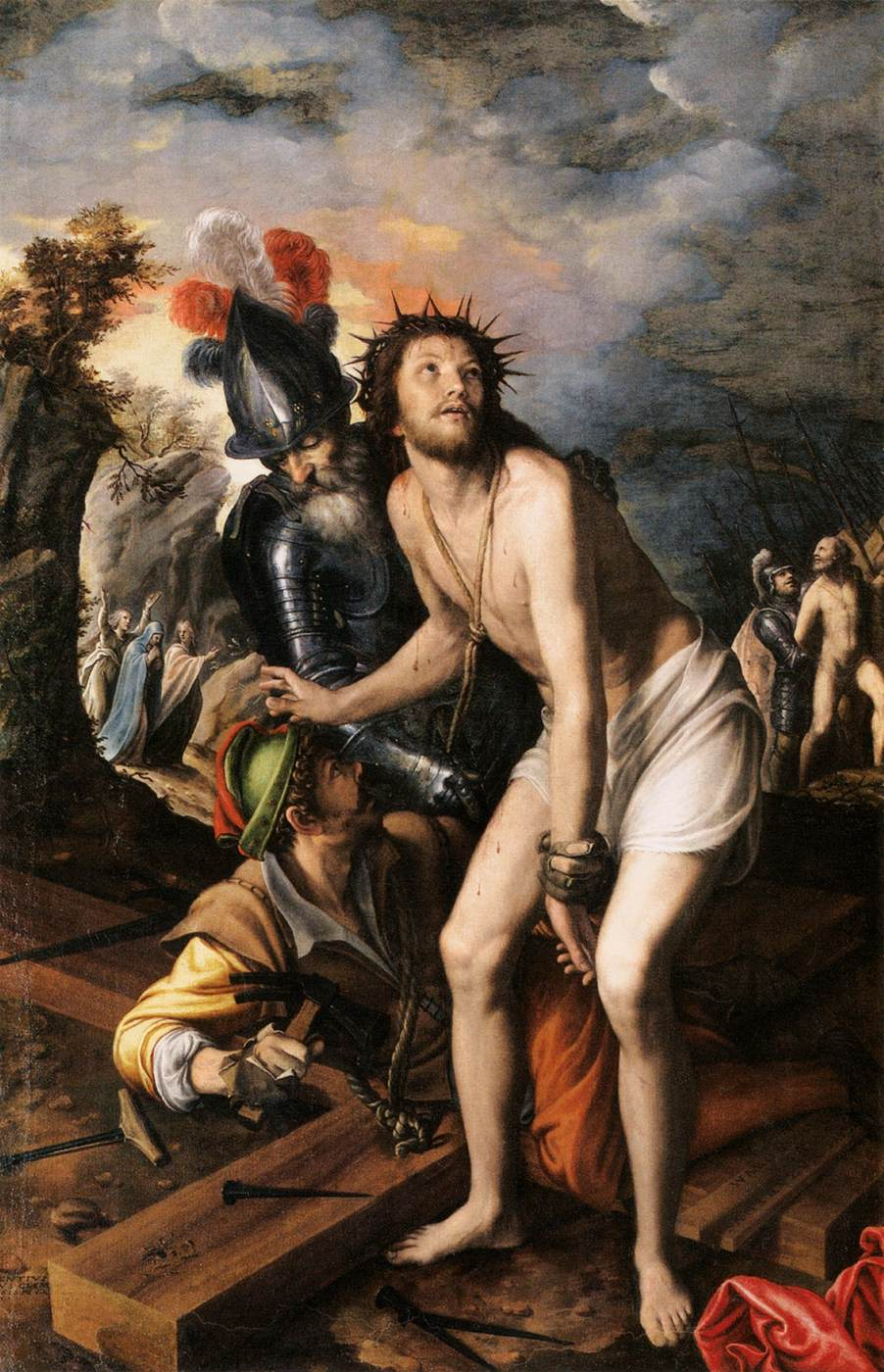
Vincenzo Campi, Christ at the cross (1575).

Room C preserves the portraits of Gian Galeazzo, his second wife Caterina and numerous members of the dynasty. Then there is the study, frescoed in the second half of the 16th century with a trompe-l'oeil landscape, punctuated in squares by monumental monochrome figures with serpentine legs, called telamons, while the vault, decorated with spectacular grotesques painted with a brush tip. on a white background, it houses in the center, within an elliptical frame, the representation of the Dream of Constantine. Next to it is room D, originally intended as an oratory of the guesthouse, the vault of which is decorated with frescoes by Giovan Mauro della Rovere known as Fiammenghino. Then there is room F, with masterpieces by Bartolomeo Montagna, Ambrogio Bergognone and Bernardino Luini. There are also other rooms with sculptures, paintings and frescoes from the monastery and its construction site.

== Burials ==
- Ludovico Sforza Neither Ludovico nor his spouse Beatrice are actually buried here, this being a cenotaph, i.e. an empty funeral monument
- Beatrice d'Este
- Gian Galeazzo Visconti
- Isabella, Countess of Vertus

== See also ==
- Late medieval domes
- Italian Renaissance domes
