= Giovanni Antonio Amadeo =

Italian sculptor (c. 1447 – 1522)

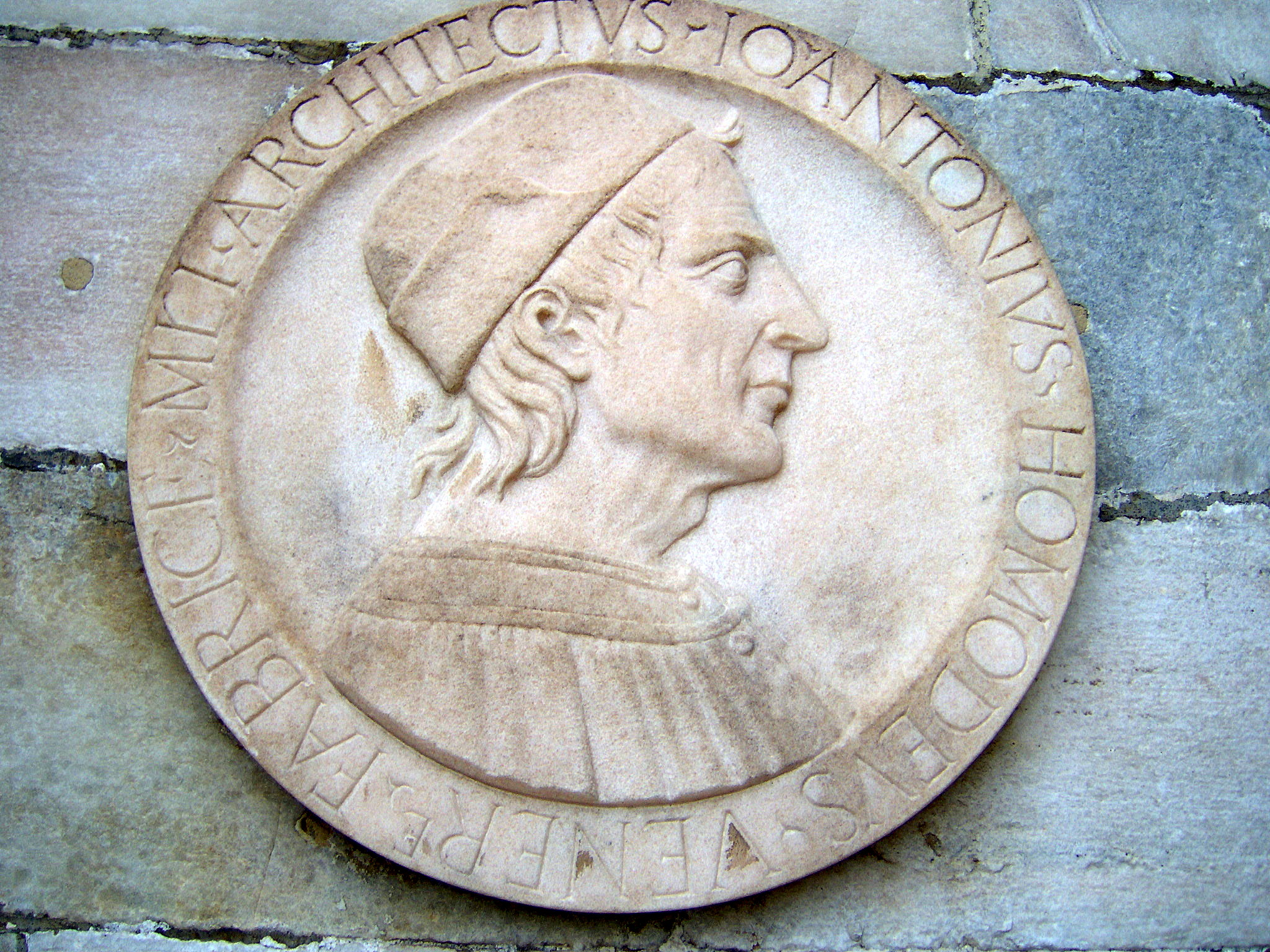
Amadeo, Milan Cathedral

Giovanni Antonio Amadeo (c. 1447 – 27 or 28 August 1522) was an Italian Renaissance sculptor of the Early Renaissance, architect, and engineer. He dominated late fifteenth-century Lombard architecture and sculpture.

== Biography ==
Amadeo was born in Pavia, son of Aloisio. Starting from 1460, he trained under the master Francesco Solari.

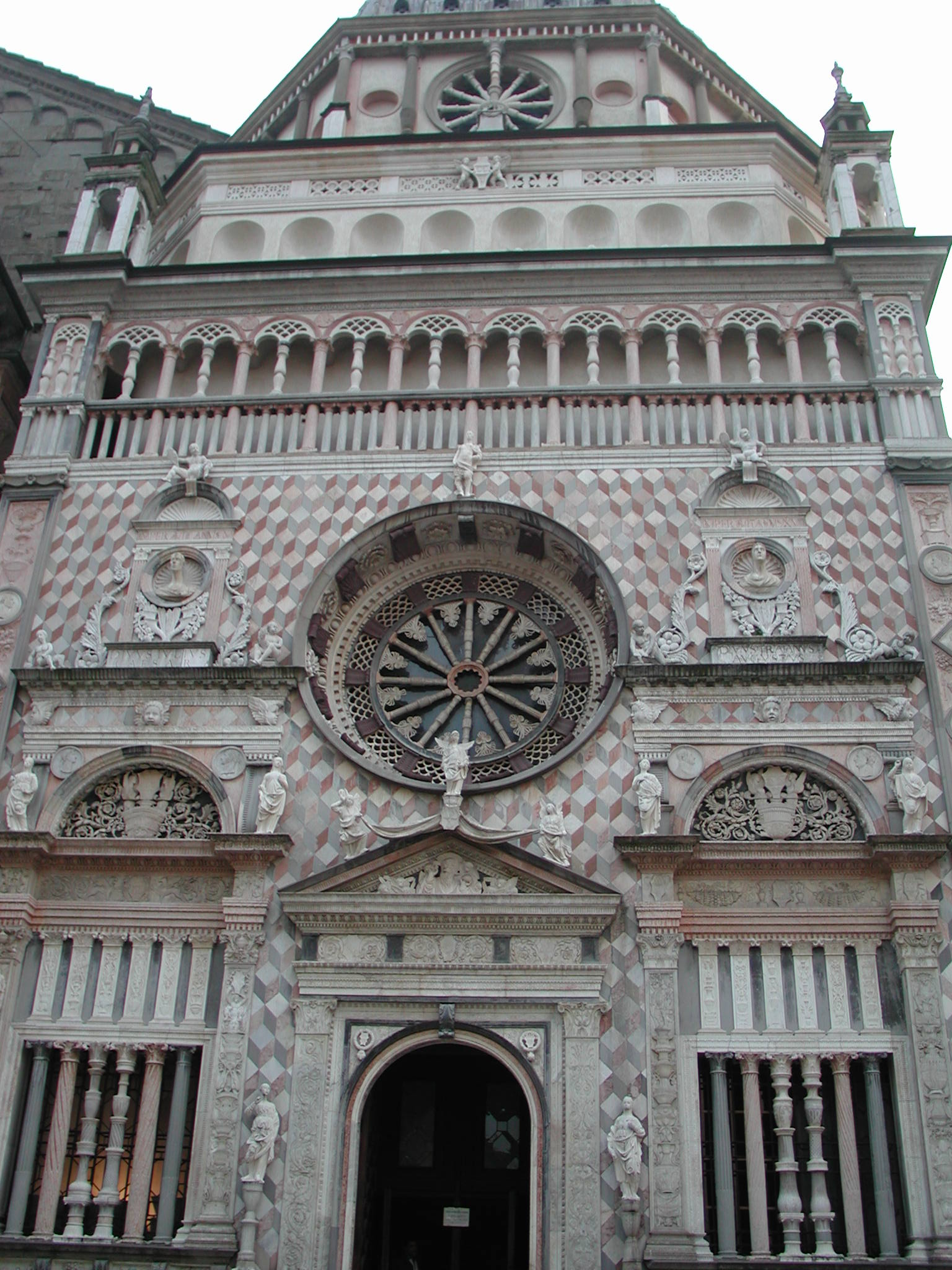
The Colleoni Chapel in Bergamo

In 1466, he was engaged as a sculptor, with his brother Protasio, by Duke Galeazzo Maria Sforza to work at the famous Certosa, near Pavia. While engaged at the Certosa, he executed the beautiful door leading from the church into the cloister, still known as "the door of Amadeo". During 1473–1476, Amadeo realised half of the bas-reliefs in the right side of the façade.

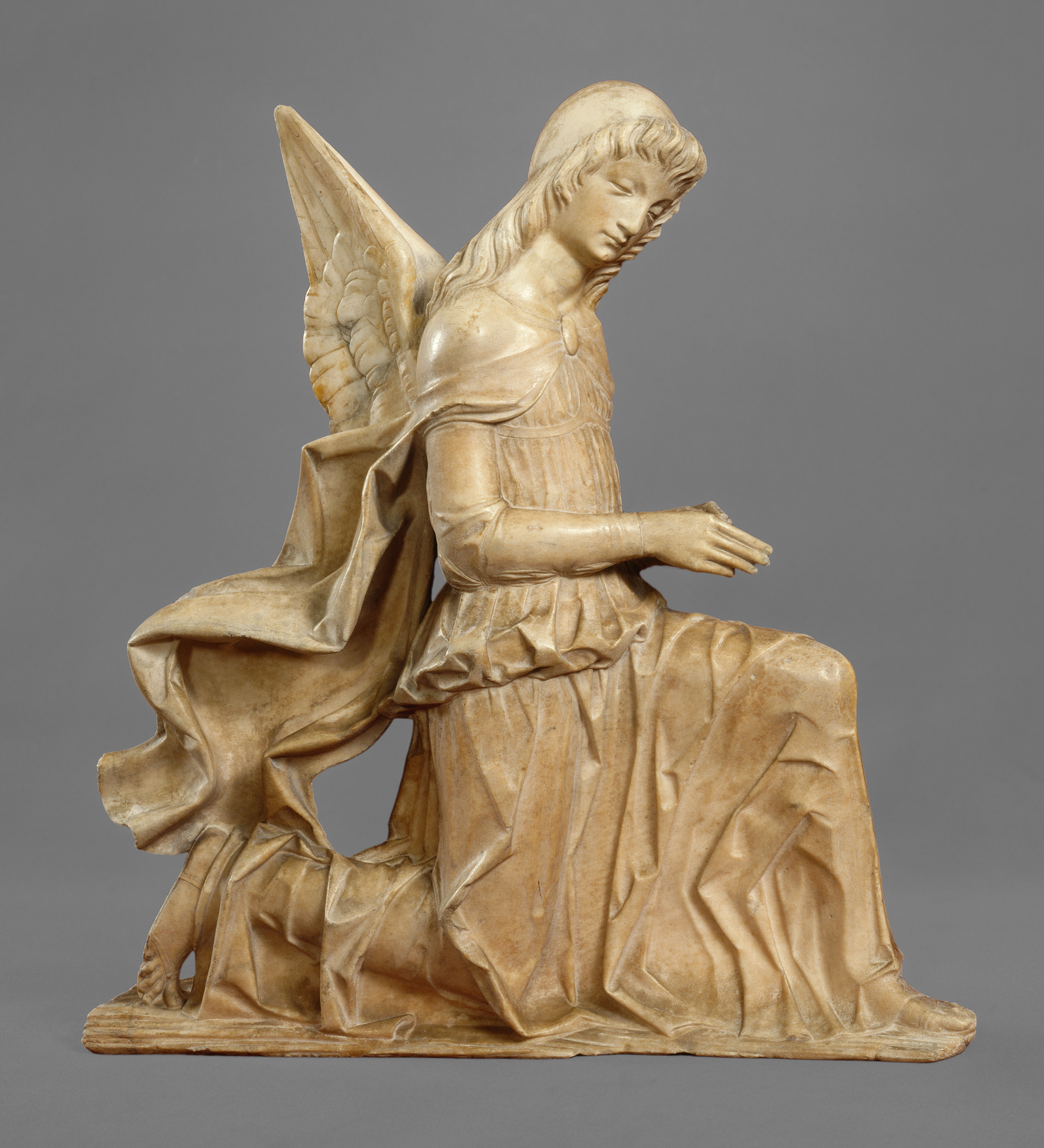
Kneeling Angel, c. 1447–1552, National Gallery of Art

In 1470 he was commissioned by Bartolomeo Colleoni to complete his funerary chapel, the Cappella Colleoni in Bergamo, which had been begun by Guiniforte and Francesco Solari. Amadeo added polychrome decoration and many sculptures in the ancient style including medallions, small columns, busts, reliefs of "Histories from the Old Testament" and "Histories of Hercules".

Amadeo also designed the funerary monument to Medea Colleoni, which was intended for the church of Santa Maria della Basella in Urgnano. The condottiero's tomb was realised in collaboration with other artists, with Amadeo providing the reliefs of the lower sarcophagus and of the smaller upper sarcophagus, as well as seven statues of the Virtues. He returned to Pavia in October 1478.

In 1480, he finished the arch of the Persian Martyrs in the Olivetani Monastery of Cremona (four marble reliefs remain today, dated 1484). Also attributed to him are two statues of Justice and Temperance in Cremona, and reliefs in the National Antiquity Museum of Parma.

On the death of Guiniforte Solari in 1481, Amadeo had been temporarily appointed to succeed him as head architect of the Certosa and was commissioned to make a fresh design for the façade, with the assistance of Benedetto Briosco, Antonio della Porta, and Stefano di Sesto. But it was not till 1490, when he was confirmed in his office, that he made the design which was accepted, and which was subsequently carried out by him and his successors.

Amadeo ran a sizeable workshop and undertook a number of projects for members of the Sforza family. In 1485, he collaborated with his brother-in-law Pietro Antonio Solari in the Ospedale Maggiore of Milan, a project of which he was made director ten years later.

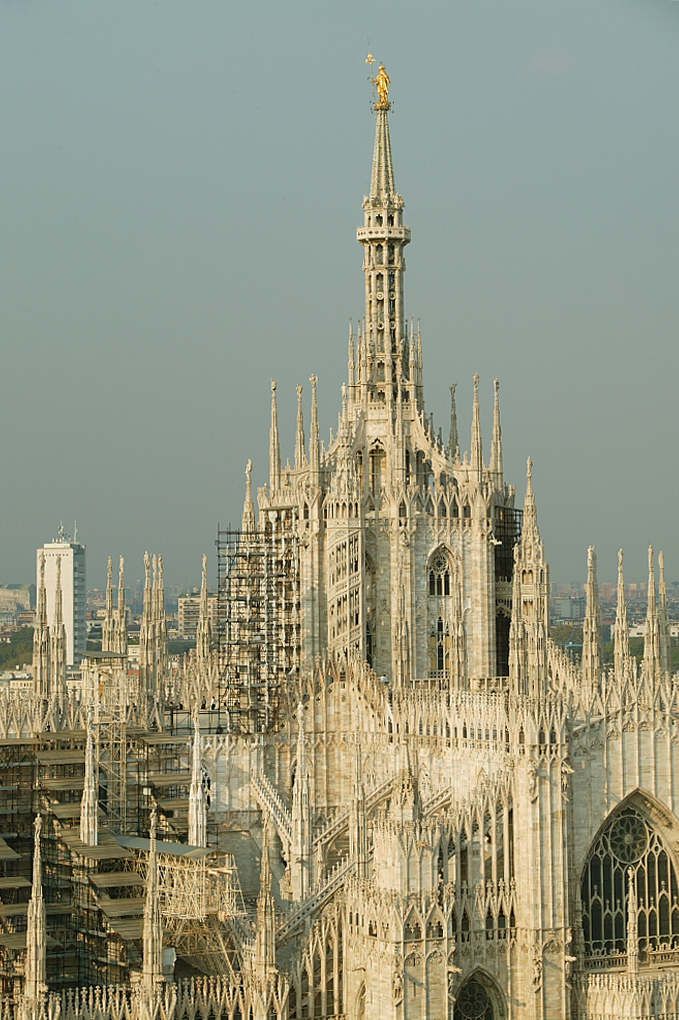
The octagonal crossing tower (tiburio) of Milan Cathedral, designed by Amadeo

Amadeo was then active in the decoration of the Milan Cathedral, and carried out work on the central vault and lantern. He collaborated with Donato Bramante on the facade of Santa Maria presso San Satiro in Milan. In 1488 Amadeo was commissioned by Cardinal Ascanio Sforza, to become director of works of the new Pavia Cathedral, again with Bramante having a minor role. In 1489, he helped design and build the Arca di San Lanfranco for the church of that name in Pavia. In this period he worked also as Ducal engineer for Ludovico il Moro, designing fortifications at Chiavenna and Piattamale, as well as repairing of roads and bridges in Valtellina and (in the 16th century) hydraulic works; for Ludovico, he also realized a Loggia in the Ducal Palace of Vigevano, as well as some statues for the Milanese Cathedral. From 1495, Amadeo directed the works of the church of Santa Maria presso San Celso at Milan.

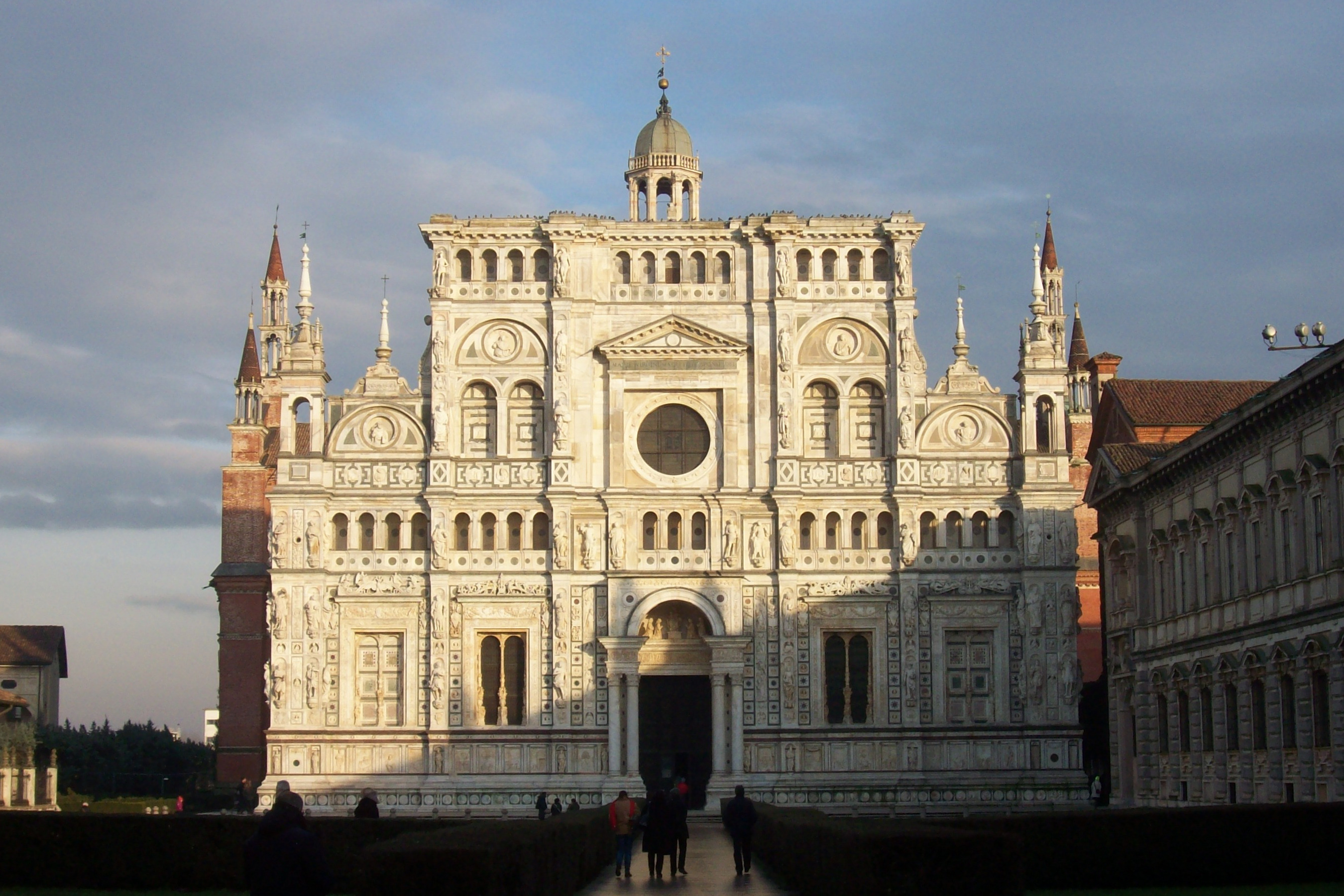
Certosa di Pavia.

From 1497, he directed works at the Milan Cathedral, finishing the tambour in 1500.

In the 16th century, Amadeo designed the church of Santa Maria di Canepanova, also in Pavia. In 1501, he sculpted reliefs with "Stories of the Carthusians" and "Life of St. Bruno" for the Certosa of Pavia. In 1982 it had been proven that the Sanctuary of Santa Maria alla Fontana in Milan, attributed for many years to Leonardo da Vinci was in fact designed by Amadeo. In 1508, he also presented a model for the spire of the Milan Cathedral, which was not executed.

The notable façade of the Cathedral of Lugano, considered a masterpiece of Renaissance architecture, has also been attributed to Amadeo.

He died in Milan on 28 August 1522.

== Sources ==
- Ticozzi, Stefano (1830). Dizionario degli architetti, scultori, pittori, intagliatori in rame ed in pietra, coniatori di medaglie, musaicisti, niellatori, intarsiatori d'ogni etá e d'ogni nazione. Vol. 1. Gaetano Schiepatti. p. 46 – via Google Books.
- "Early Renaissance Artists", Encyclopedia of Art History
