= Guiniforte Solari =

Italian sculptor (c. 1429 – c. 1481)

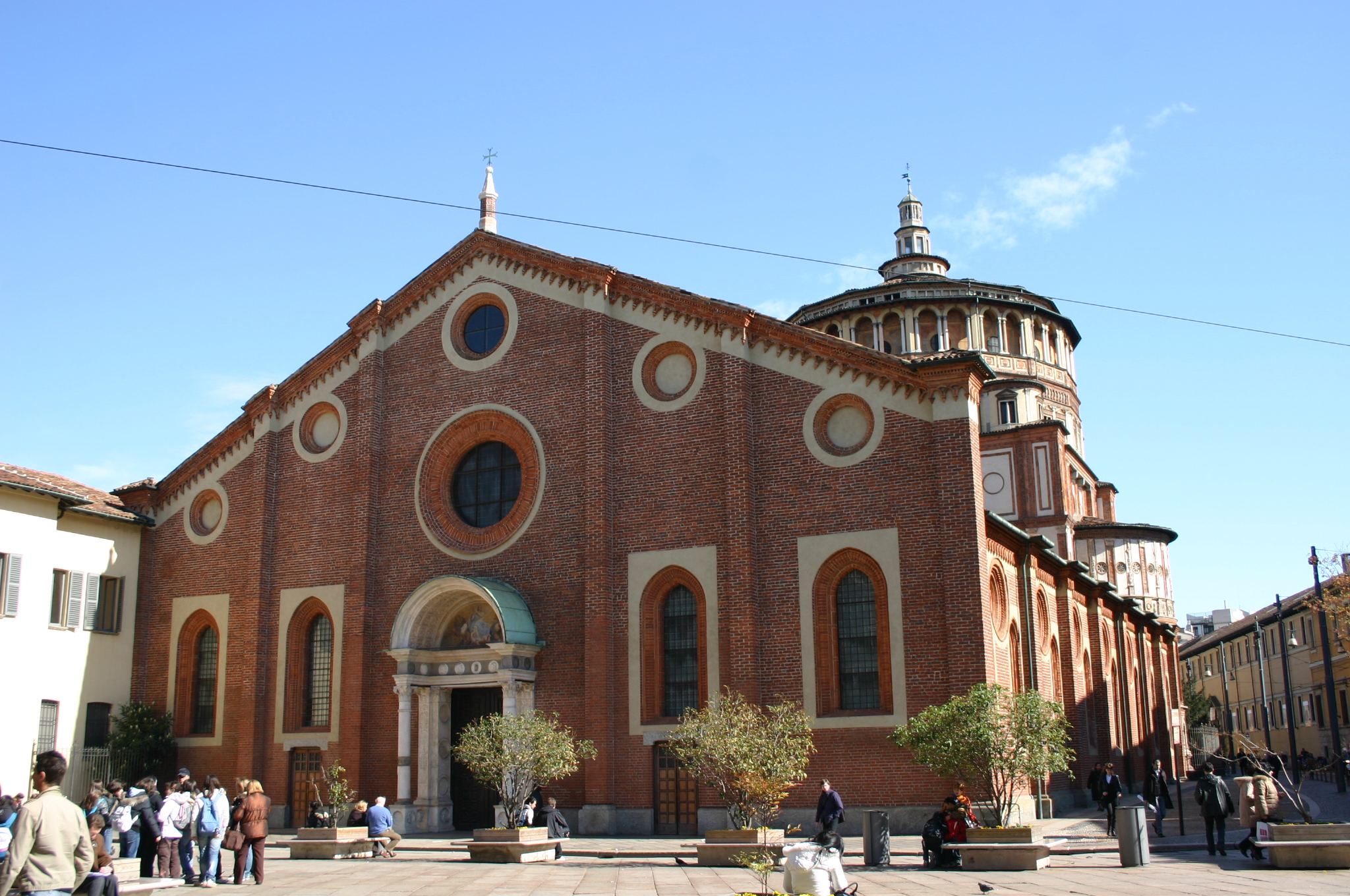
Church of Santa Maria delle Grazie (Milan)

Guiniforte Solari (c. 1429 – c. 1481), also known as Boniforte, was an Italian sculptor, architect and engineer.

== Life ==
Born in Milan, he was the son of the architect Giovanni Solari, and brother of Francesco Solari.

Guiniforte was chief engineer of the Duchy of Milan during his life. He is especially remembered for his disputes with Filarete, who had been called by Duke Francesco I Sforza to modernize the Lombard architecture according to the new Renaissance styles. However, Solari represented the local Gothic tradition.

Buildings which he worked on include the Duomo, the church of Santa Maria delle Grazie and the Ospedale Maggiore in Milan, and the Certosa of Pavia. Also attributed to him is the Portinari Chapel, in the church of Sant'Eustorgio, Milan.

He died in Milan around 1481. His son Pietro was also a distinguished sculptor and architect.
