= Carlo Urbino =

Italian painter

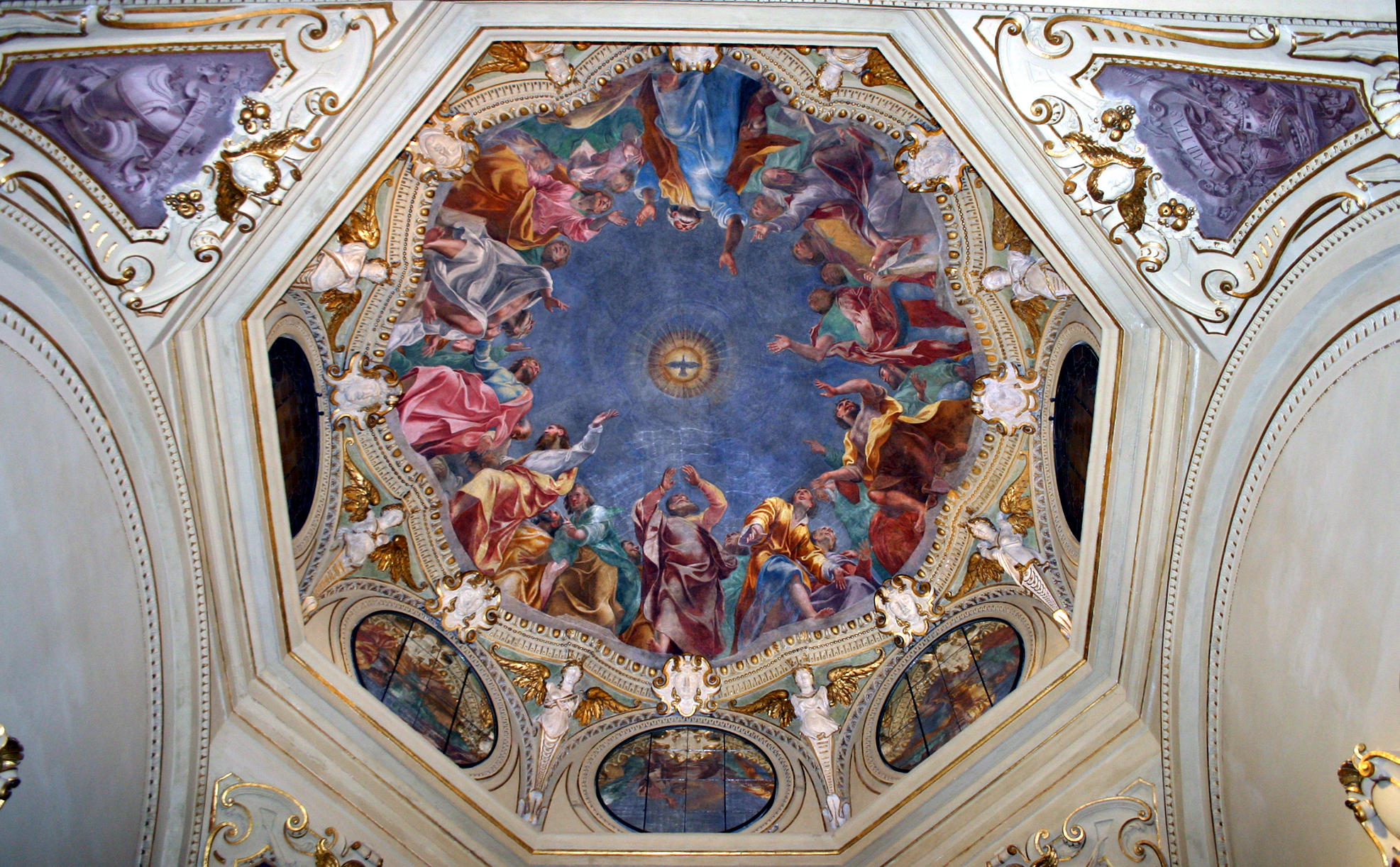
Fresco from the Chapel of Pentecost in the church of San Marco in Milan

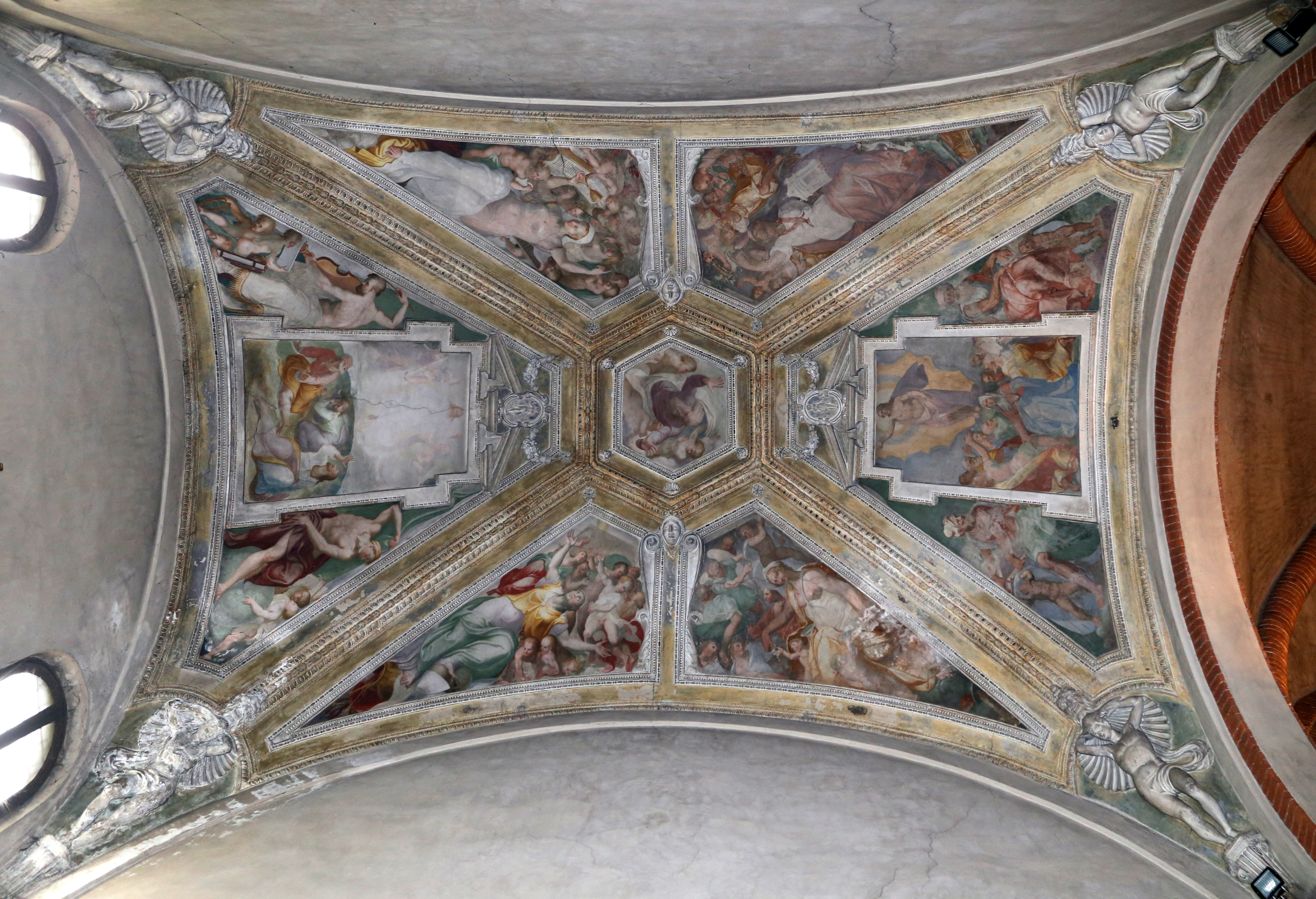
Fresco from the Chapel of Saint Vincent Ferrer in the church of San Eustorgio in Milan

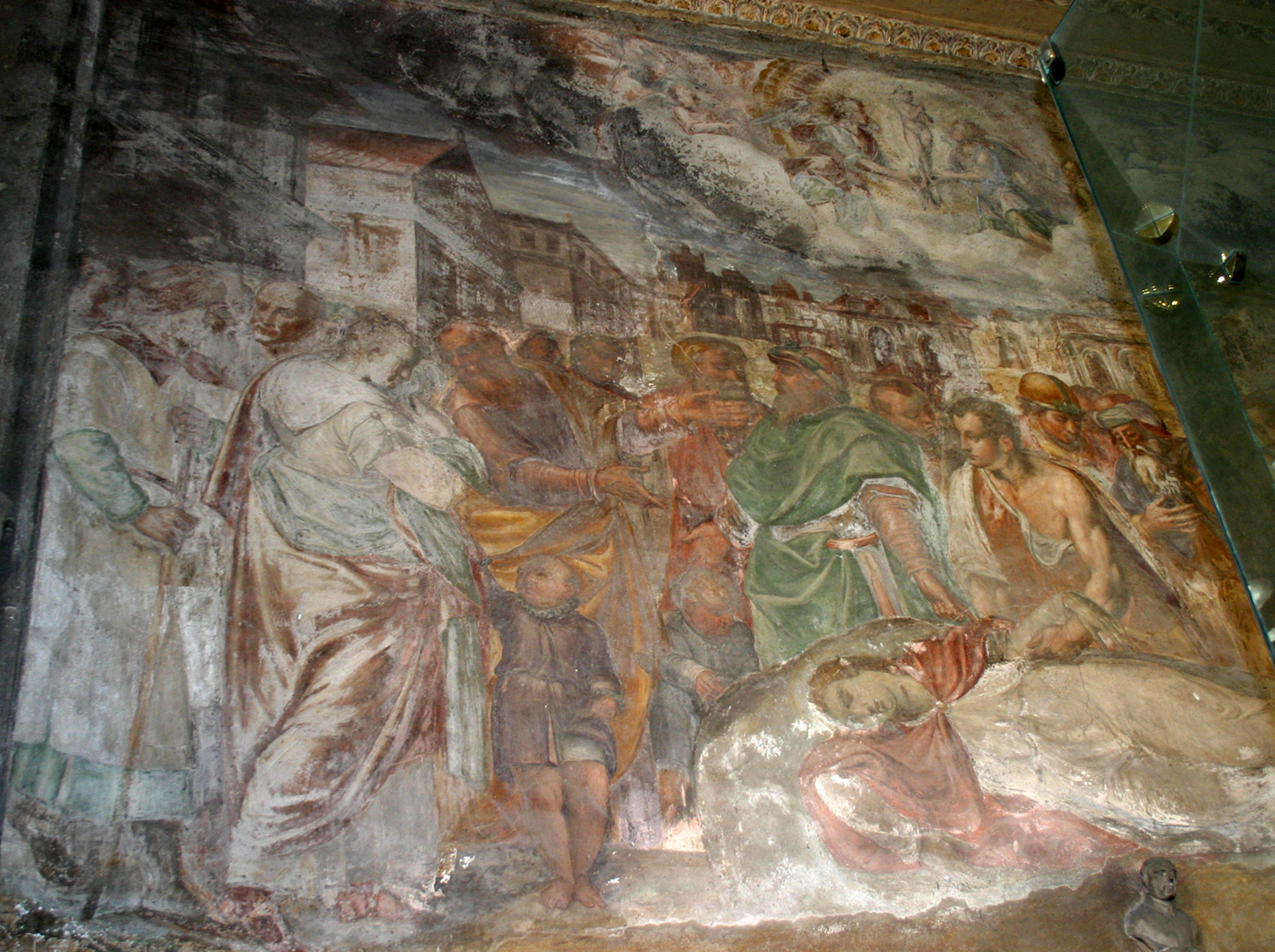
Fresco of the recovery of the body of Saint Aquilinus in the church of San Lorenzo in Milan

Carlo Urbino (1525/30–1585) was an Italian painter of the Renaissance.

He was born in Crema. His style recalls the mannerist work of the Campi family: Antonio, Bernardino, and Giulio . He trained in the Veneto and is known to have participated in drawings for a treatise on the science of armaments by Camillo Agrippa. In 1556, he painted the canvas of Christ and Mother and an Assumption of the Virgin for Santa Maria presso San Celso in Milan. He helped decorate a Chapel in Santa Maria della Passione. Later he worked with Bernardino Campi, for example in the Transfiguration (1565) in the church of San Fedele in Milan. The canvas of Doubting Thomas is found in the Pinacoteca di Brera. He painted in the Chapel of the Angels in Sant'Eustorgio, a Pentecost in the church of San Marco. In the 1570s, he returned to Crema, where he painted a canvas for the Sanctuary of Santa Maria della Croce, and in Sabbioneta, painted frescoes for the Palazzo del Giardino of Vespasiano Gonzaga.
