= Santa Maria della Croce, Crema =

Sanctuary and minor basilica in Crema, Italy

Coordinates: 45°22′30.80″N 9°41′51.56″E

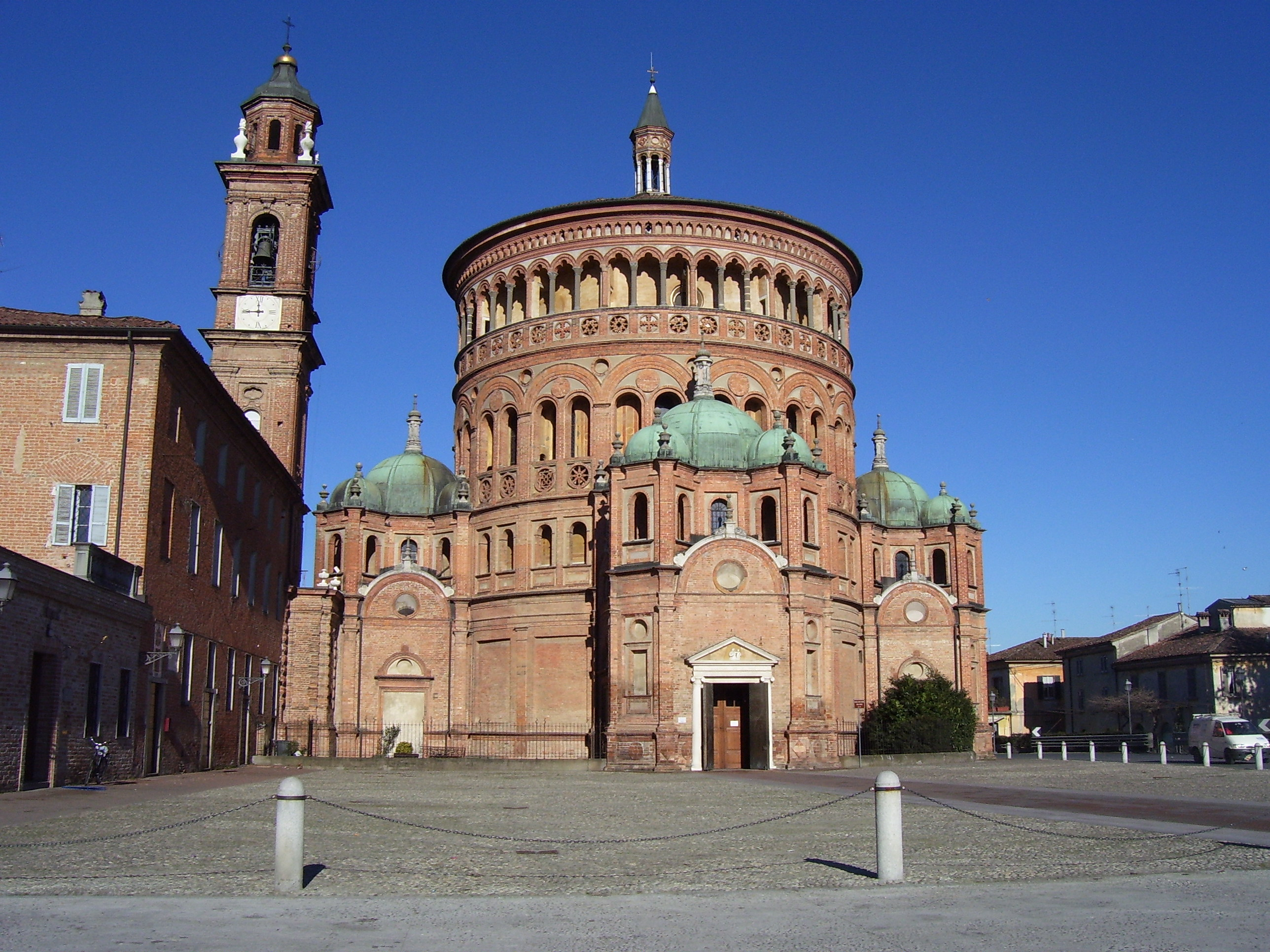
Santa Maria della Croce

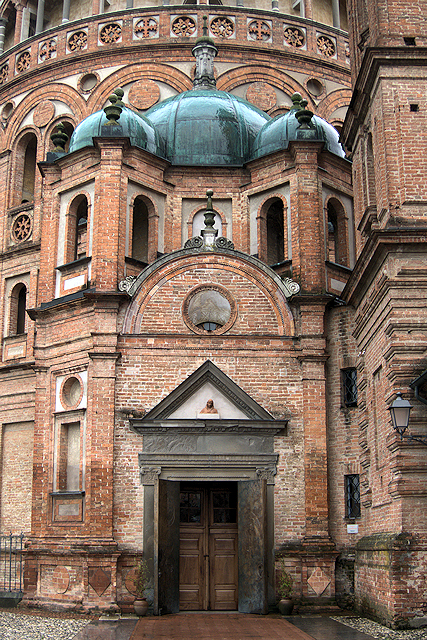
Detail of the western portal

Santa Maria della Croce is a Roman Catholic sanctuary and minor basilica in Crema, in the Cremona Province of Lombardy, Italy.

== History ==
The church was built in the Lombard Renaissance style about one and a half mile from the city center, outside the medieval walls, on the road to Bergamo where a Marian apparition may have affected Caterina degli Uberti, a woman from Cremona. Legend holds that on 13 April 1490, after she was fatally wounded by her husband in a wooded area close to the town, and wishing to die in the Grace of God, she implored the help of the Virgin Mary who, it is said, ferried her to a nearby farmhouse. She was then moved inside the city walls where she died, after receiving the last rites and pardoning her husband. A simple wooden cross was placed where the murder came about. However prodigious phenomena continued to happen time and again transforming the site into a holy place to such an extent that the local authorities decided to build a sanctuary.

Bramante made a model for the church, but the work was commissioned to his assistant Giovanni Battagio, who added the four outer circular structures. Battagio left the project around 1500, and was replaced by Giovanni Montanaro. The sanctuary, in an unfinished state, was damaged in the 1514 siege of the city by the Duchy of Milan.

In 1694 the sanctuary was committed to the care of the Discalced Carmelites who, in 1706, began the construction of the annexed convent. In 1710 they also added a bell tower. In 1914 the original pavement, in cotto, was replaced with the current tiles. Santa Maria della Croce was named a minor basilica by Pope Pius XII in 1958.

In recent years, the sanctuary was entrusted to the Congregation of the Missionaries of the Holy Spirit, a religious community of men who live a contemplative and apostolic life and currently serve also in Milan, Rome, and Sicily.

== Description ==
Battagio designed a Greek cross plan, with a c. 35 m-tall central structure (circular externally, octagonal internally), to which four smaller units, with a height of some 15 m, are joined. The building's exterior consists of undecorated bricks.

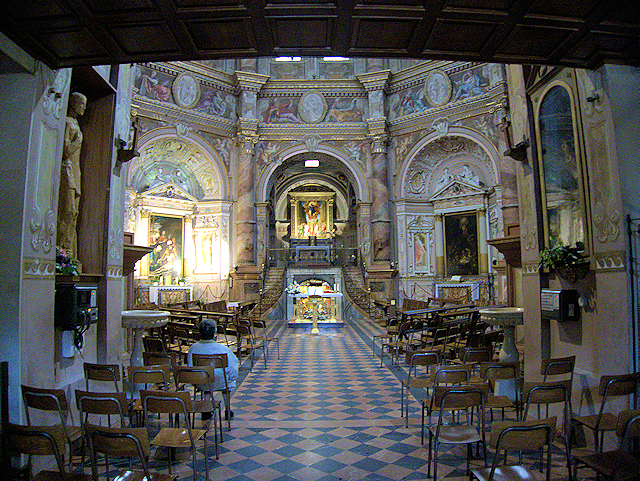
View of the interior.

Externally the main central unit is divided into four rows, the lower having pilasters, the second a gallery with mullioned windows, while the third has triple arches forming double mullioned windows with decorated parapet. The original project for the uppermost gallery was modified by Montanaro along the lines of the Venetian gothic style; it has small columns, trefoil arches and a decorated parapet similar to that of the second gallery, with roundels in the shape of octagonal snowflakes, stars, sun rays and Greek crosses.

The western side minor body houses the church's main entrance with a portal surmounted by a tympanum. The three other side bodies present analogous features. The upper part of the side bodies merges with the central loggia of the second row. The bell tower is decorated with rustication, and is divided into six levels, including the lantern at the top.

One of the side bodies is built on two levels. In the lower level is the crypt and on the upper level the main altar, which comes from the city's cathedral and is highly decorated in lapis lazuli and bronze. The altarpiece is an oil on canvas by Benedetto Rusconi, nicknamed il Diana, depicting the Assumption of Mary among the twelve apostles. The presbytery has four statues of the Doctors of the Church, executed by Agostino de Fondulis. The side altars have a rich stucco decoration (1585) by Giovan Battista Castello. The altarpieces are by Antonio Campi, Bernardino Campi, and Carlo Urbino. Other artists active in the interior paintings and frescoes, include Benedetto Rusconi, Giovanni Battista Grandi, Aurelio Gatti, Angelo Bacchetta and the Torricelli brothers from Lugano.

Internally the dome is decorated with the Mystic Visions of St. Therese of Avila by Giacomo Parravicino (1702).

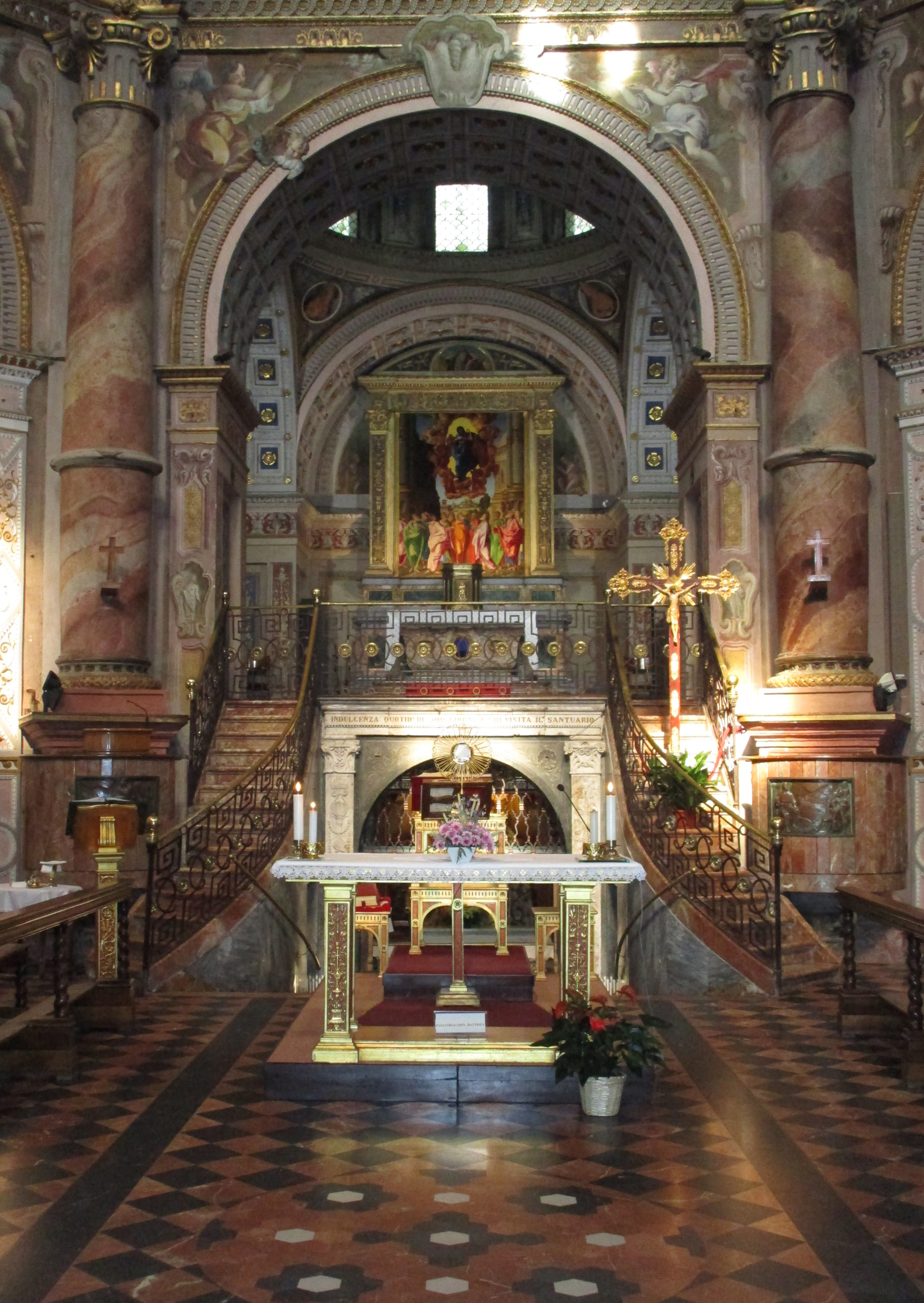
Central altar during a eucharistic adoration

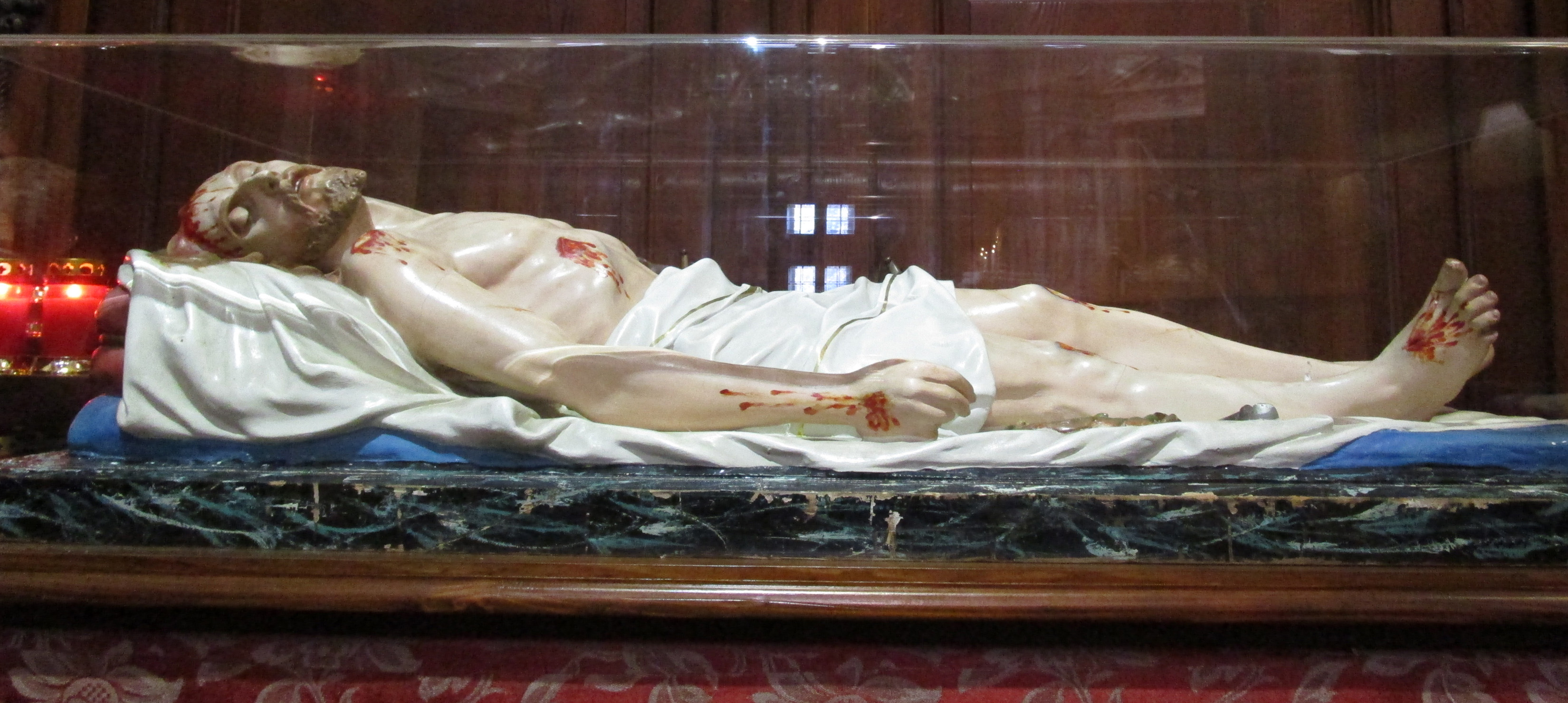
The death of Jesus of Bernardino Campi

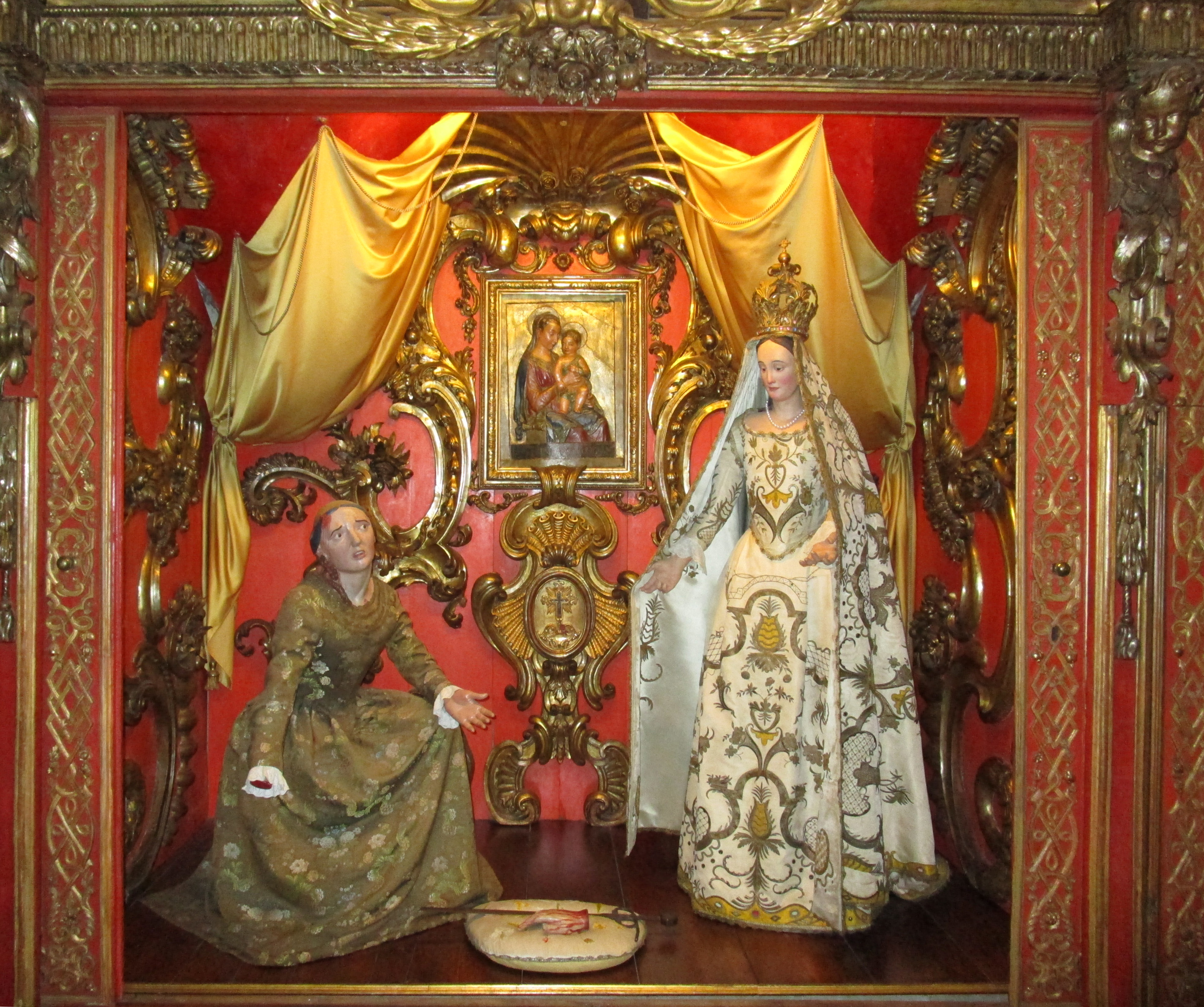
The miracle: Caterina meets Our Lady

== See also ==
- 16th-century Western domes
- Italian Renaissance domes
