= Tempio Civico della Beata Vergine Incoronata =

Catholic church in Lodi, Lombardy, Italy

Coordinates: 45°18′53.04″N 9°30′06.71″E

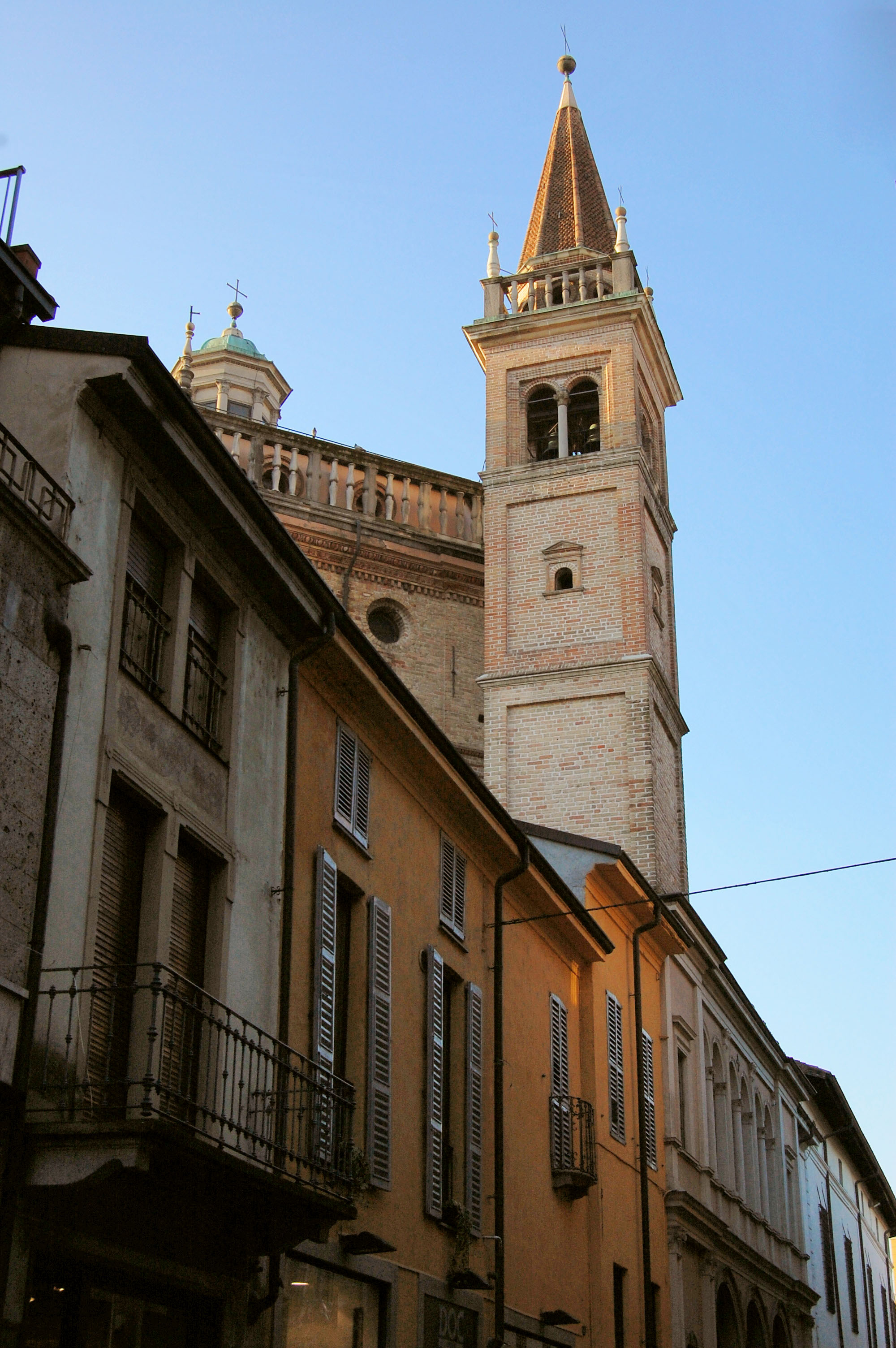
A view of the Tempio dell'Incoronata.

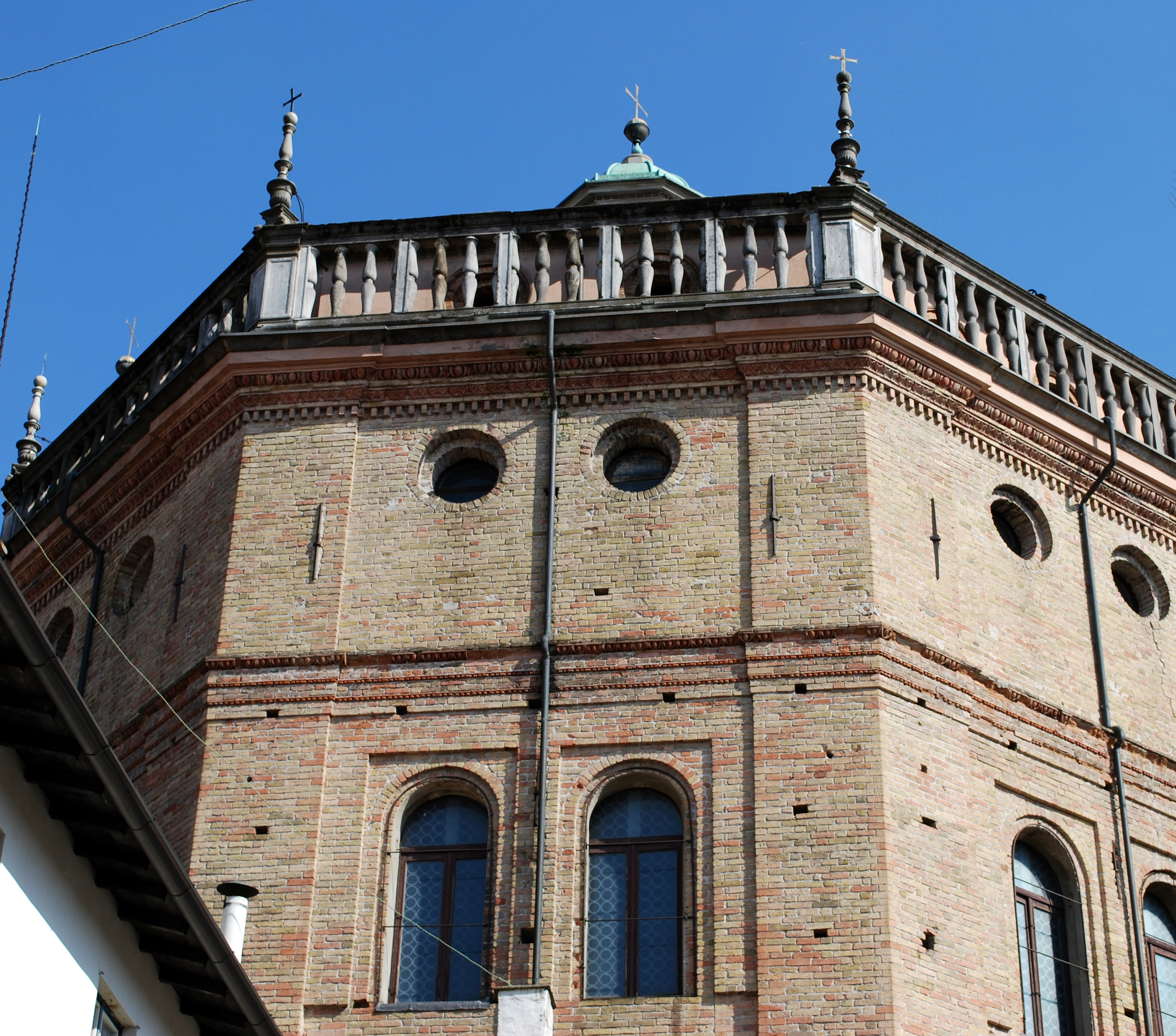
External view of base of Dome

The Tempio Civico della Beata Vergine Incoronata is a Catholic church in Lodi, Lombardy, Italy. It is considered one of the masterworks of the Lombard Renaissance art. The church was designed in 1488 by Giovanni Battagio (a pupil of Bramante), continued by Gian Giacomo Dolcebuono and finished by Giovanni Antonio Amadeo, and built at expenses of the Lodi commune, whence the denomination "Civico" ("Municipal"), on the site previously occupied by a brothel.

== Overview ==
The church is located in a very narrow street near the Piazza della Vittoria, Lodi's most famous square. It has an octagonal plan, surmounted by a dome with the same shape with a lantern at the top. Externally, running around the octagonal tambour is a balustrade with small columns and pinnacles. The bell tower was built in 1503, while the façade was completed only in 1879 by Alfonsino Truzzi.

The interior is characterized by sumptuous decorations in gold; in the upper sector is an arcaded matronaeum with blue and golden columns. It also houses a large gallery of artworks from the late 15th to the early 19th century, executed by the major artists working in Lodi. There are four panels by Bergognone, including an Annunciation and a Presentation at the Temple, reproducing the church's interior of the time. The Berinzaghi Polyptych and an Incoronation of the Virgin are by brothers Martino and Albertino Piazza. Finally, Callisto Piazza and Stefano Maria Legnani executed here some of his greatest works.

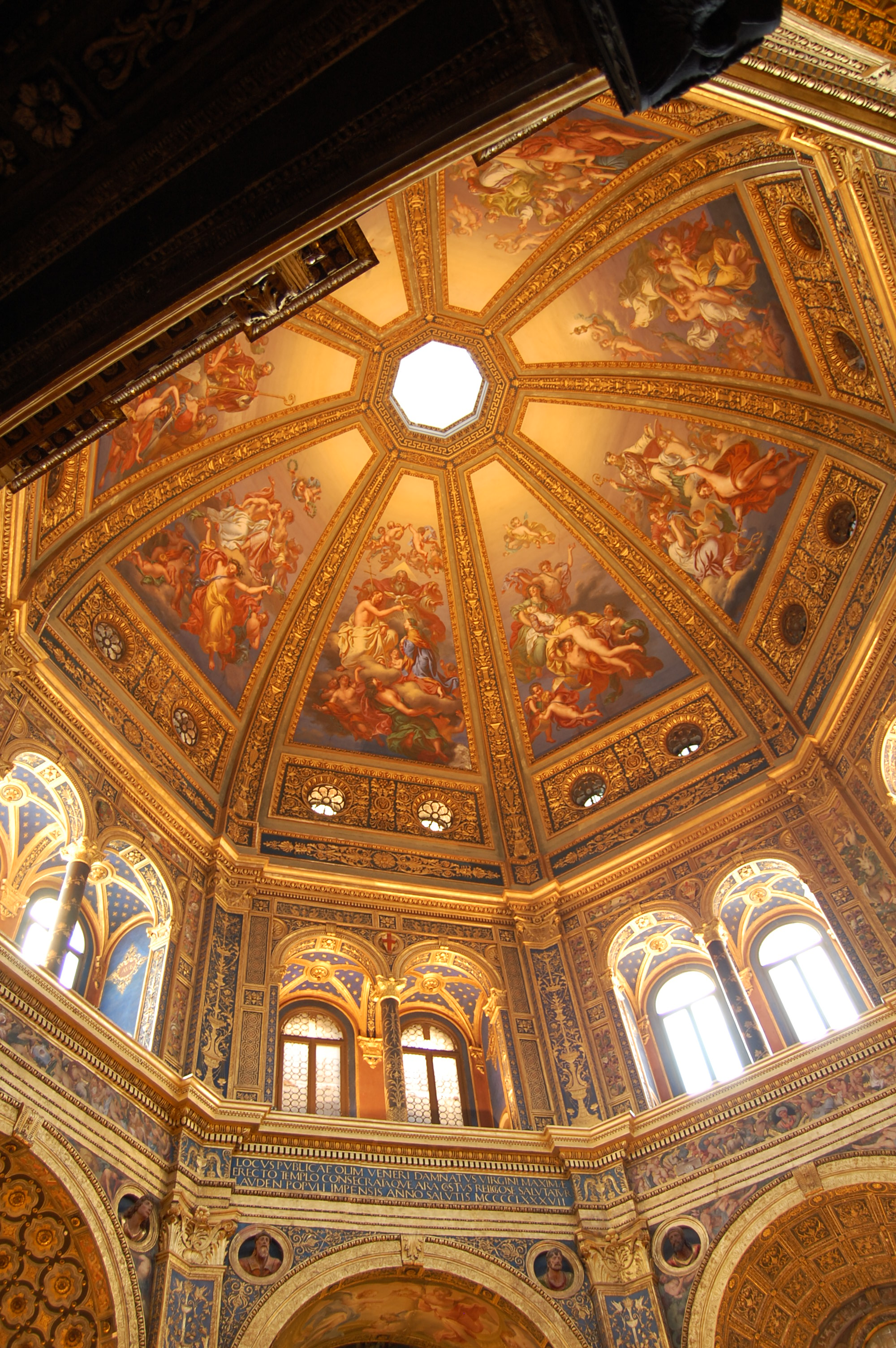
Interior view of Dome

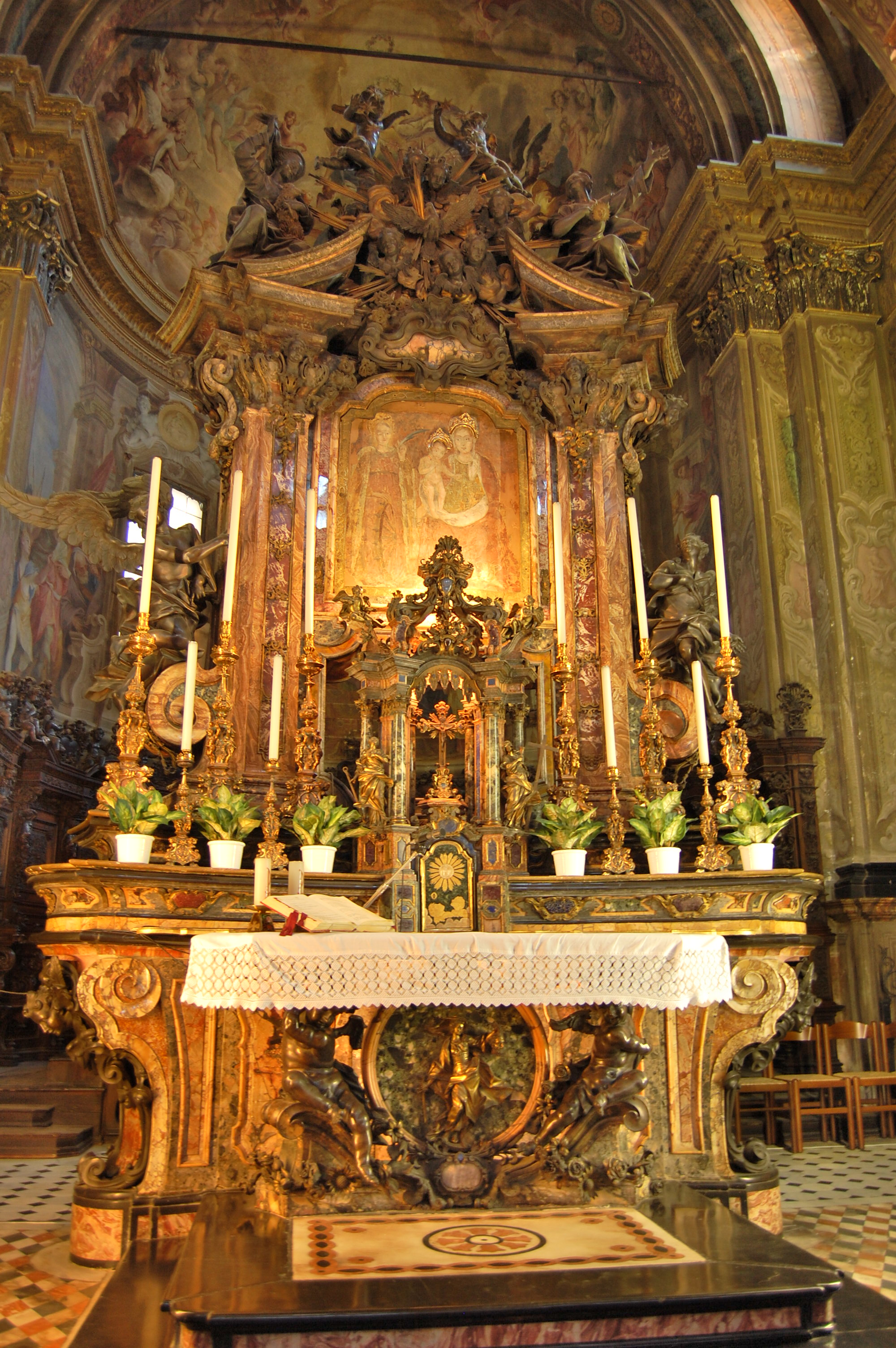
High altar.

Annexed is a Museum of the Incoronata's Treasure.

== Sources ==
- Bottini, Vittorio; Alessandro Caretta; Luigi Samarati (1979). Lodi - Guida artistica illustrata. Lodi: Edizioni Lodigraf.
