= Piacenza Courthouse =

Building in Piacenza, Italy

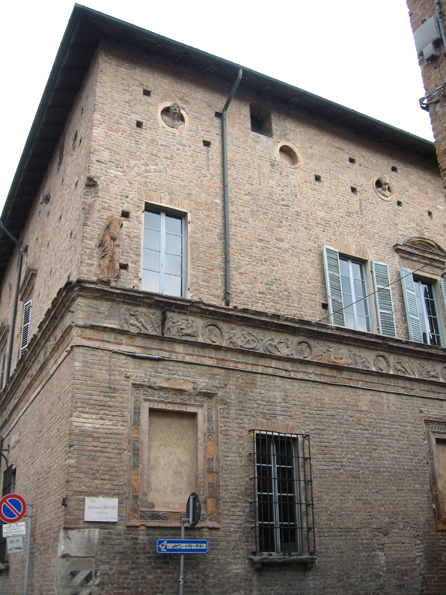
- Interactive map of the Piacenza Courthouse area

General information
- Location: Piacenza, Emilia-Romagna, Italy
- Coordinates: 45°03′07.8″N 9°41′56.6″E
- Completed: 15th century

The Piacenza Courthouse (Palazzo di Giustizia, or Palazzo del Tribunale) is a building located on Via del Consiglio in Piacenza, Italy. Formerly known as Palazzo Landi, it is one of the most remarkable examples of Renaissance architecture in Piacenza.

== History ==
Built in the late 15th century by Manfredo Landi, a counsellor to the Dukes of Milan, it stands on medieval foundations that once belonged to the powerful Landi family.

In 1578, the palace was seized by Duke Ottavio Farnese for political reasons and converted into a courthouse—a function it continues to serve to this day.

== Description ==
The elegant façade was designed by Giovanni Battagio and Agostino De Fondulis, both influenced by the work of Bramante. Particularly notable is the terracotta frieze, which features decorative motifs that blend architecture and ornamentation in a painterly style.

The marble portal, created by Giovan Pietro and Gabriele da Rho, echoes the form of a Roman triumphal arch and is adorned with classical symbols and allegorical decorations.

Inside, there are two courtyards: the first features terracotta decorations similar to those on the façade; the second houses the coats of arms of the Jesuits, who occupied the building starting in 1582. The columns and carved capitals in the courtyards are attributed to Bernardo Riccardi of Anghiera (1485).
