= Prospero Orsi =

Italian painter (1560s–1630s)

Prospero Orsi, also referred to as Prosperino delle Grottesche (1560s–1630s) was an Italian painter of the late-Mannerist and early-Baroque period, active mainly in Rome.

== Biography ==
He apparently trained under Giuseppe Cesari d’Arpino. Baglione recounts that during the papacy of Sixtus V, Prospero was one of the many artists that decorated the Scala Sancta walls and ceilings with frescoes. He worked on the depiction of Moses parting the Sea and Isaac blessing Jacob. In the benediction loggia of San Giovanni Laterano, he depicted an episode in the Life of Constantine. He also worked painting in the Vatican libraries. He is described as an avid painter of Grotteseques. He also worked with Antonio Circignani to decorate a room in the Palazzo Antici-Mattei in Rome.

While he initially was a close follower of the Cavaliere d’Arpino, he later became allied with Michelangelo da Caravaggio. Orsi and Cherubino Alberti, were among those who helped bail Caravaggio out of prison in 1605. Baglione states:

That after some time, I know not for what reason, they (Orsi and Arpino) came to have little affection, and he (Orsi) became one of the Dragoman (translator for the exotic and foreign) of Michelangelo da Caravaggio, and was contrary to the Cavaliere as much as possible when he worked.

His date of birth is unclear, Baglione describes him as young (20-30s?) during the papacy of Sixtus V (1585-1590), and as having died at the age of 75 during the papacy of Urban VIII (1623-1644). His first works documented are with Galeazzo Ghidoni in decorating the Castel Sant’Angelo in 1582. Mancini in 1620 describes him as in his 50s. This all suggests a birth in early 1560s, and death after 1630.
