= Ghidoni =

Ghidoni is an Italian surname. Notable people with the surname include:

- Alberto Ghidoni (born 1962), Italian alpine skier
- Galeazzo Ghidoni (late 16th century-early 17th century), Italian painter
- Matteo Ghidoni (c. 1626–1689), Italian painter
- Paola Ghidoni (born 1963), Italian politician
