= Pesenti family =

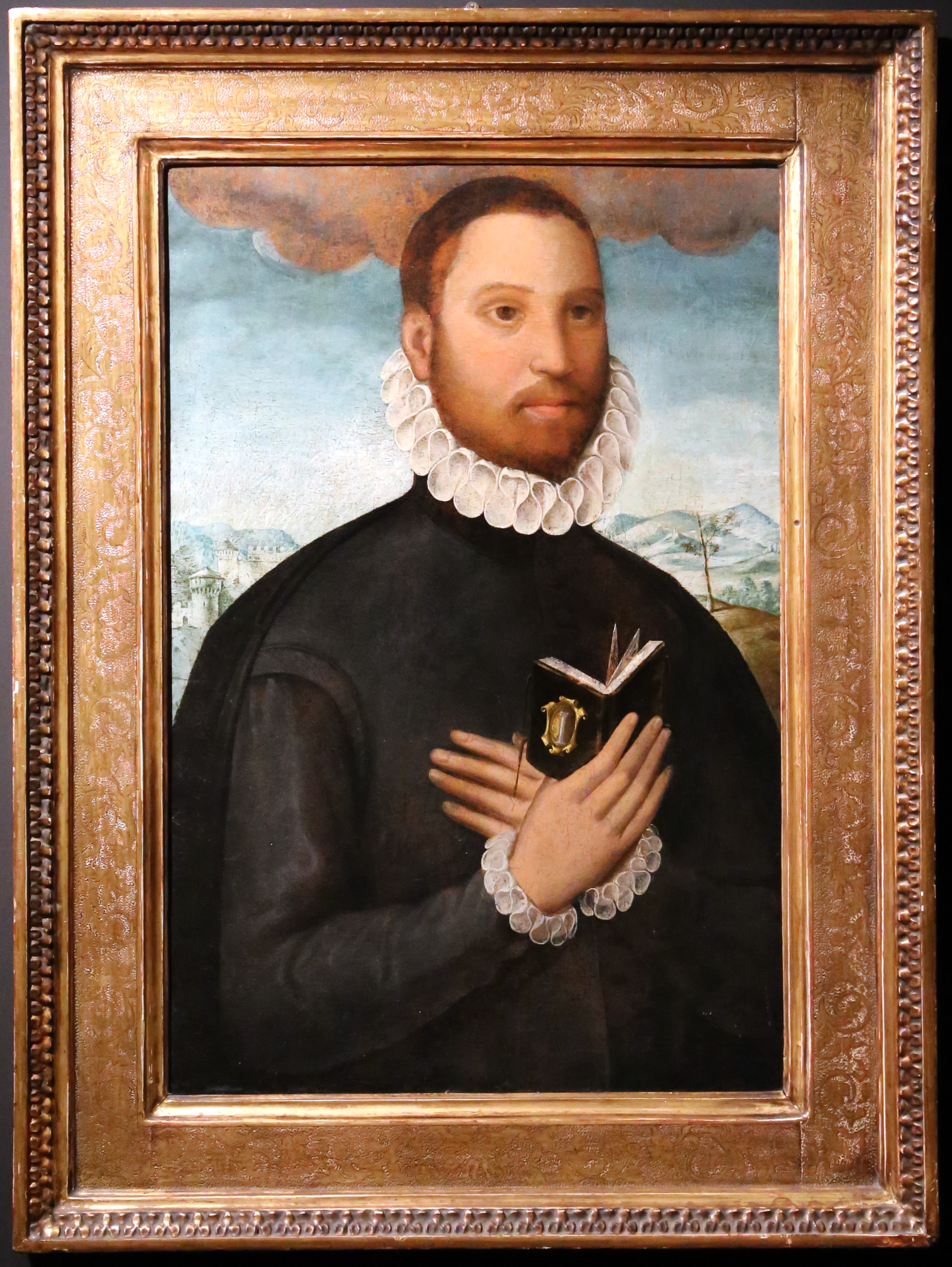
By Francesco Pesenti

The Pesenti or Sabbioneta family of artists was active in Cremona from the 15th to the 17th centuries. The founder of the dynasty of artists was Galeazzo Pesenti Seniore, also called Il Sabbioneta, active in the 15th century in Cremona. Sabbioneta refers to a parish in Cremona.

His sons Francesco Pesenti and Vicenzo Pesenti were painters. A painting of the Virgin with Saints Gregory and Bartholomew (1557) found in parish church of Spigarolo oltre Po, was attributed to Francesco. An Adoration of the Magi at Sant'Agostino, Cremona was signed Franciscus Sabloneta Cremonenesis.

In 1570, Pietro Martire Pesenti restored paintings in the Cathedral of Cremona. He also designed a funereal catafalque for Senator Ala, and the triumphal arch for the arrival of Archduke Rudolf to Cremona on 21 December 1563. He helped create the decoration for the Palazzo del Giardino in Sabbioneta, working under Bernardino Campi.

Giovanni Paolo Pesenti and Martino Pesenti were also active in Cremona in the late 16th and early 17th centuries. Juniore, Carlo Galeazzo Juniore and Giuseppe Galeazzo (active 1590) were also painters in Cremona.
