= Galleria degli Antichi and Palazzo del Giardino =

Historic buildings in Sabbioneta, Italy

Coordinates: 44.9976°N 10.4899°E

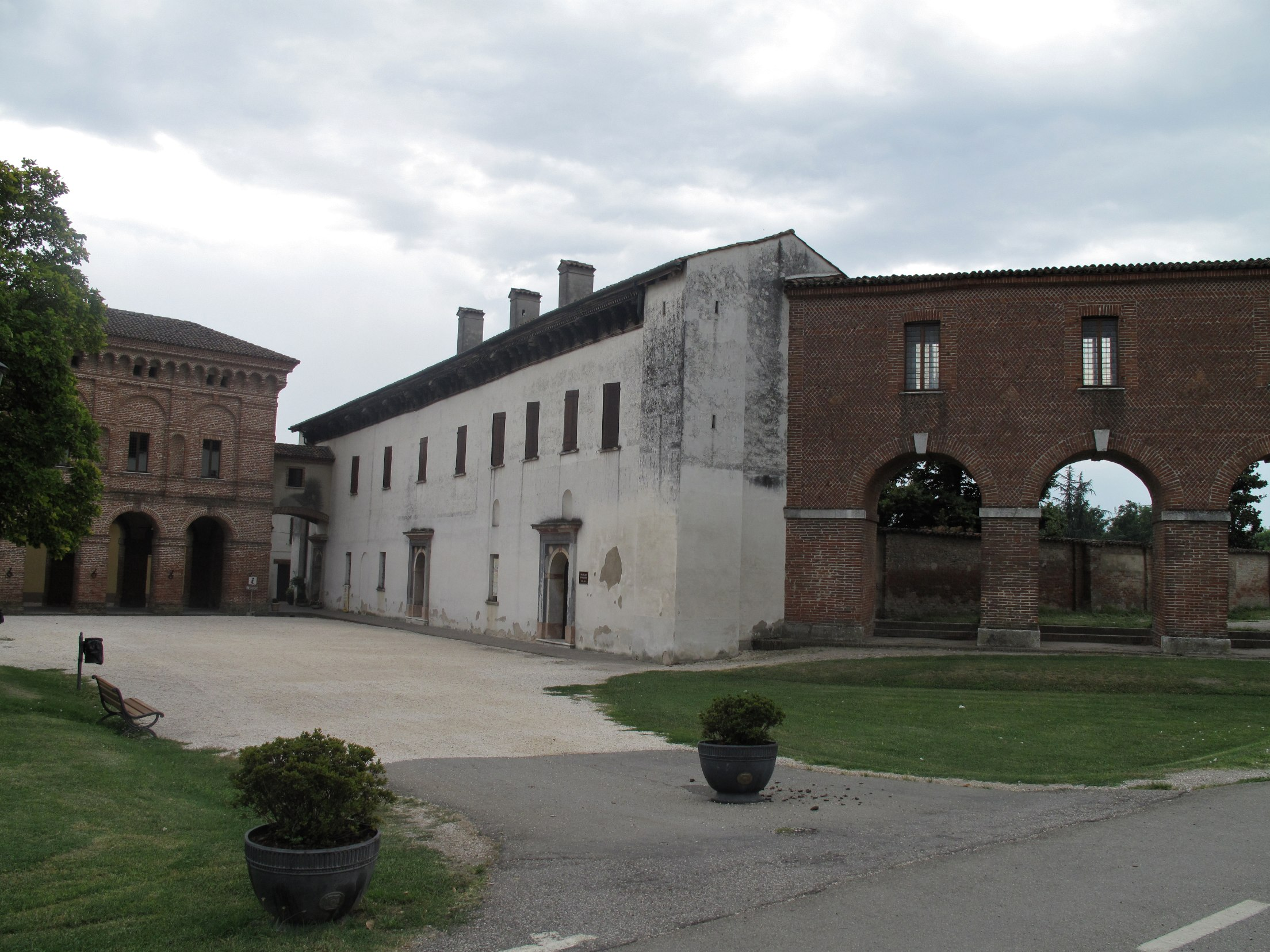
From left to right: Galleria degli Antichi, white Palazzo del Giardino, and small corridor

The Galleria degli Antichi and the Palazzo del Giardino are adjacent, contemporaneous, Renaissance-style buildings located on Piazza d`Armi #1 in Sabbioneta, in the Province of Mantua, region of Lombardy, Italy. Prior to 1797, the buildings were connected to the Rocca or Castle of Sabbioneta (razed by Napoleon's forces during the Siege of Mantua), and the gallery once housed the Gonzaga collection of antique Roman statuary and hunting trophies. While the architectural design of the gallery is striking, the richness of the interior decoration of the palazzo is also dazzling.

== Galleria degli Antichi ==
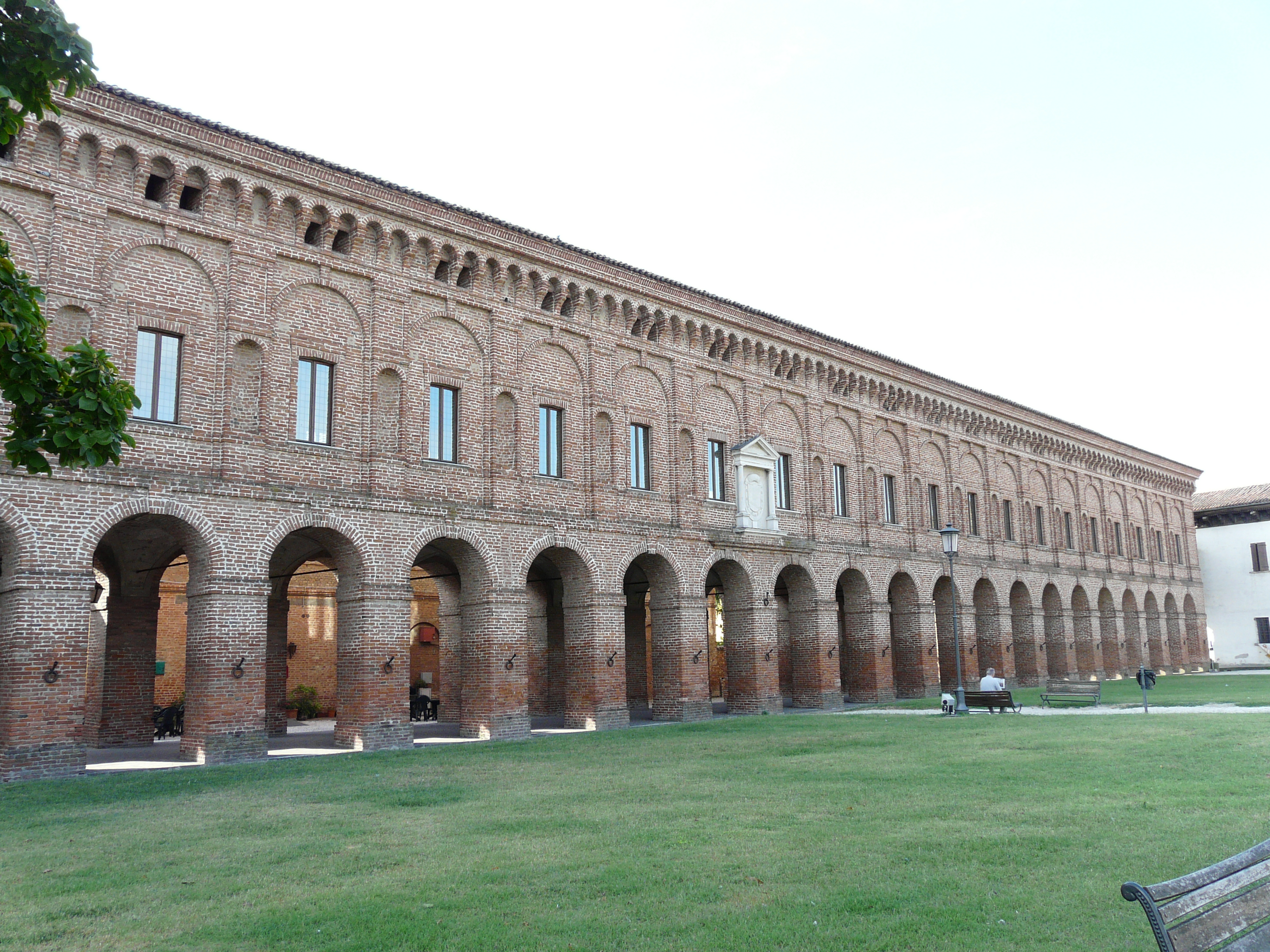
Exterior of gallery

.

The galleria or gallery was once a corridor, aligned south to north, linked to the large Sabbioneta Castle that stood inside the walled town. Described as a "grand corridor" of the castle, it was built with stone and brick in 1584–1586. It connects to the externally drab Palazzo Giardino, which through a second portico (corridor piccolo), once connected to the castle. The statuary collection was acquired in the 16th century by Vespasiano Gonzaga from antique dealers and collectors of northern Italy, as well as much of it carried away as booty by his father after the imperial Sack of Rome in 1527. The hunting trophies originated from imperial collections in Prague. Much of this collection remained in the palace until 1773, when the Austrian authorities transferred them to the Palace of the Accademia di Mantova, leaving the gallery an elegant but vacant shell of its former state. In 1915 the renamed Accademia Nazionale Virgiliana ceded the collection to the comune, which has since moved it to the Palazzo Ducale of Mantua. Many pieces however, were either sold or looted in the imperial Sack of Mantua (1630) during the War of the Mantuan Succession.

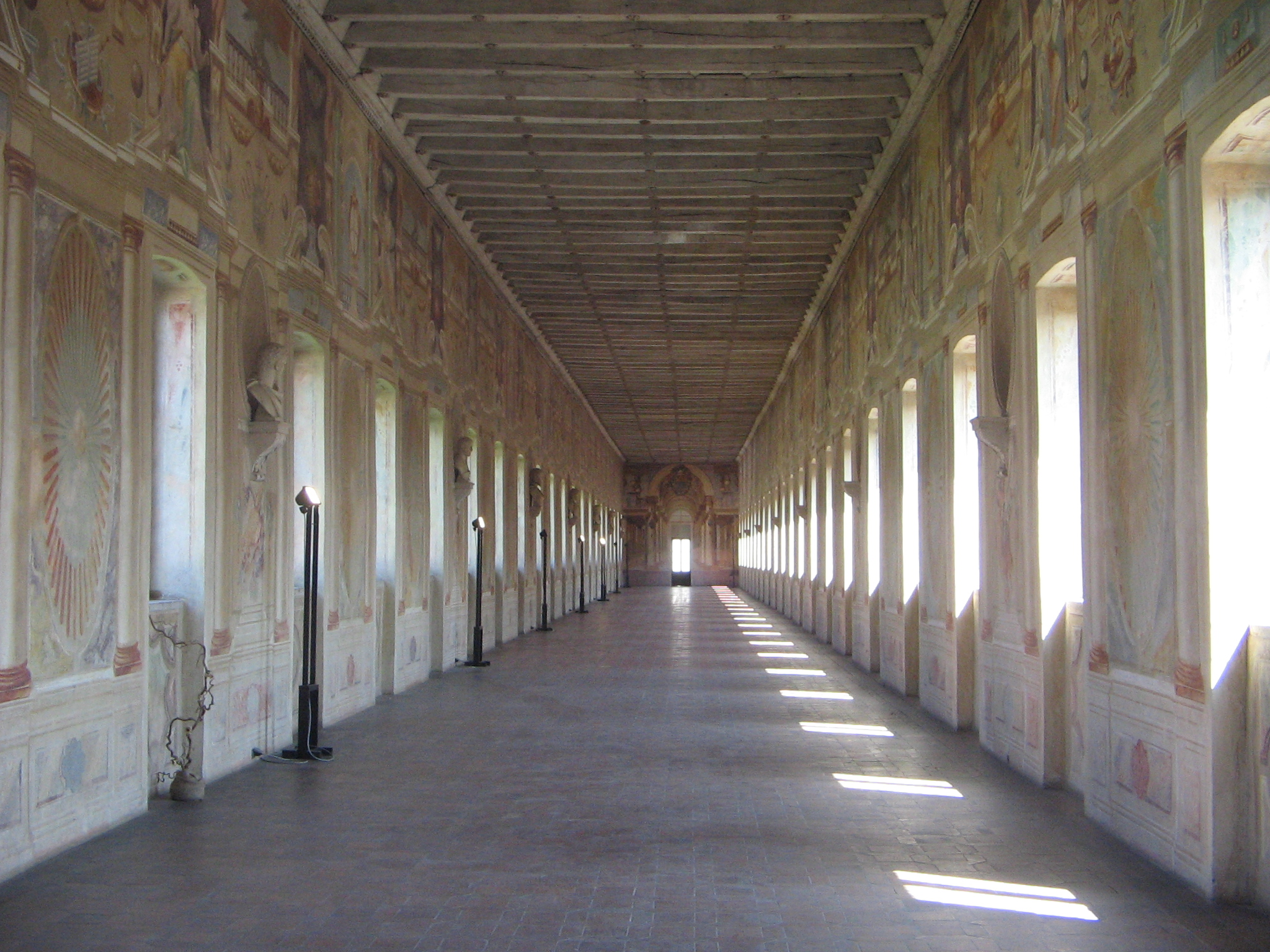
Interior of gallery

The fresco decoration of the narrow gallery was completed in 1587 by Giovanni and Alessandro Alberti, and included some architectural trompe-l'œil.

== Palazzo Giardino ==
The Palazzo Giardino, or Casino of Sabbioneta, is an externally non-descript white building, aligned east-west and standing at the south end of the Galleria degli Antichi. The building was erected from 1580 to 1588. The exterior is now plain white stucco but at its completion, it was said to have been decorated with geometric designs. It has two formal stone entrance portals, and a sculpted cornice (1583). The interiors, however, are richly frescoed; the paintings were completed (1582–1587) by a team of painters led by Bernardino Campi. Each room has a specific dominant theme, but the entirety represents a wide sampling of classic pagan antique mythology.

Ascending via a marble staircase, one reaches the Camerino dei Cesari on the piano nobile. On the wall is Rome Triumphant with Winged Victory, flanked by two subdued stone barbarians. A peristyle has portraits of six emperors. The room is decorated with grotteschi. Depictions of Fame and a boy playing cymbals complete the room.

The next room is titled that of Baucis and Philemon. A Gonzaga coat of arms is painted in the center, flanked by two cranes and two lions, symbols respectively of vigilance and strength. The stucco frames were modeled by Giovanni Francesco Bicesi, also called Il Fornarino. The individual panels depicting scenes from the story of Philemon and Baucis in Ovid's Metamorphoses were painted by Bernardino Campi. The long walls depict the Circus Maximus and the Circus Flaminius, and between the windows is an urban perspective from a theater. In 1584, a marble fireplace was placed in the room.

In the next room, the Camera dei Miti, niches once held busts, statuary, and paintings of Gonzaga properties. The vault has gilded stucco frames by Pietro Martire Pesenti, these hold panels painted by Campi, depicting:

1. Philyra seduced by Saturn as a horse while Cupid sleeps beneath a laurel
2. Daedalus and Icarus
3. Arachne and Minerva
4. The fall of Phaeton
5. The punishment of Marsyas

Floor tiles and marble shelves were moved in 1773 to the Palazzo Ducale in Mantua.

Across a small corridor decorated with a fresco of the myth of Orpheus, one enters the duke's studiolo. Here ovals frame depictions of the cardinal virtues with dense decoration of classical images. Campi was aided in this regard by Carlo Urbino. Another corridor, again painted with Orpheus, leads to a hall of mirrors. In the long walls are painted displays of trophies and weapons and four panels depicting the myth of Paris. In the arches of the courtyard walls were mirrors, made of Venetian glass, that served as doors of cabinets. On the shelves around the doors were busts. The bas-reliefs over the windows depict scenes of Roman life sculpted by the stucco artist Bartolomeo Conti, while the landscapes have been attributed to the Flemish painter Jan Soens.

The next room is the Camerino delle Grazie, decorated by Fornarino. The walls are richly decorated with grotteschi and mythological figures such as Apollo, the three Graces, Diana of Ephesus, and Venus with Cupid. The vault had gilded stucco frames, with a Medusa in the center. Finally, a small stairwell painted with ivy leads to a dressing room, called the Venus Room.

Little remains of the former Italian garden, visible through the windows of the hall of mirrors—only a few grottoes with niches. The central one has a marble clamshell basin. In the 16th century, the gardens had walkways sheltered by trees, and the garden facade had sculpture in its niches.
