= Antonio Campi =

Italian painter

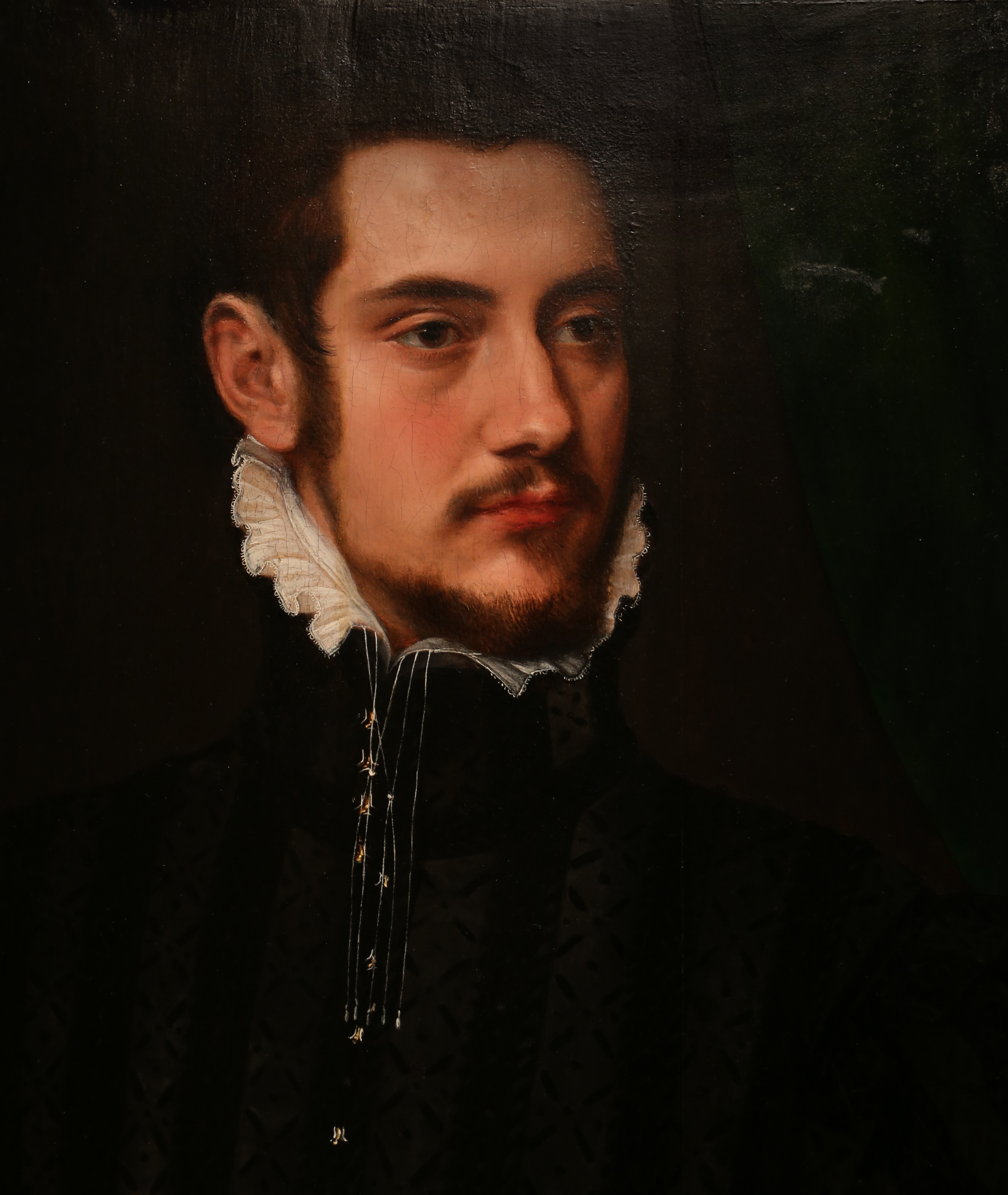
- Portrait of a gentleman.
- Born: c. 1522; Cremona, Duchy of Milan
- Died: January 1587; Cremona, Duchy of Milan
- Education: Giulio Campi
- Known for: Painting
- Movement: Mannerism

Antonio Campi (c. 1522 – January 1587) was an Italian painter of the Late Renaissance.

== Biography ==
Antonio Campi was born in Cremona around 1522. He was the half brother of Giulio Campi, and the full brother Vincenzo Campi. Bernardino Campi may have been a relative. All were active as painters.

Antonio probably trained with Giulio in a style tending towards Mannerism. His first signed and dated work, the Virgin and Child with St. Jerome and St. Joseph, with Donor (1546; Cremona, Sant'Ilario), reflects the style of Camillo Boccaccino, himself inspired by Parmigianino, and the influence of Boccaccino on Antonio increased in the following years and is particularly marked in a series of chiaroscuro engravings (1547 to the early 1550s; e.g. Adoration of the Magi, 1547).

Around 1547 Antonio collaborated with Giulio on frescoes in Santa Margherita, Cremona. Still working with Giulio, from 1549 he painted at least half of the eight canvases for the Palazzo della Loggia, Brescia, illustrating Stories of Justice (in situ and dispersed in Brescia, Pinacoteca Tosio Martinengo; Budapest, Museum of Fine Arts), and in 1557 he frescoed part of the first bay of San Sigismondo in Cremona. Also in the 1550s Antonio worked on the decoration of two rooms in the Palazzo Pallavicini in Torre Pallavicina and possibly on its architectural plan.

The decoration of the presbytery of San Paolo Converso, Milan, dates from before 1564. The rich and forceful Mannerist style of these works is also evident in the Resurrection (1560; Milan, Santa Maria presso San Celso) and is even more striking in the Beheading of St. John the Baptist (1567), in the chapel of San Giovanni in San Sigismondo, Cremona, which was entirely decorated by Antonio over a period of almost 20 years. During the 1560s Antonio veered between different styles: the Pietà (1566) in Cremona Cathedral is starkly devotional; the Holy Family (1567; Cremona, San Pietro al Po) conveys a sense of grandeur; and the Sacra conversazione (Milan, Pinacoteca di Brera) displays sumptuous elegance.

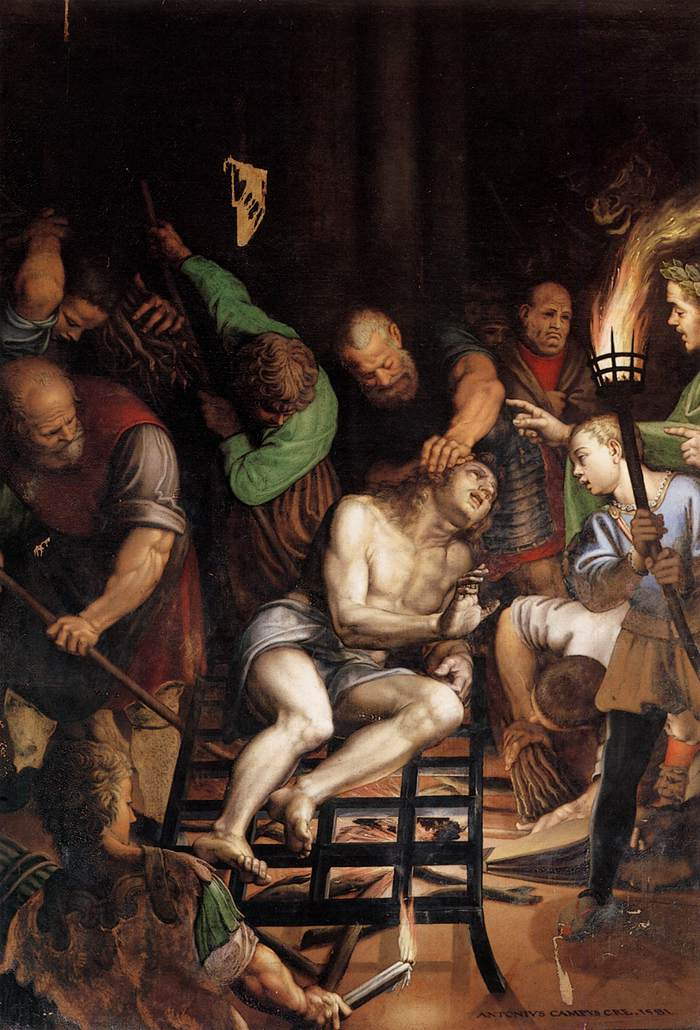
The Martyrdom of St Lawrence, San Paolo Converso, Milan

Possibly because of his contact with the Archbishop of Milan, Charles Borromeo (1538–84; canonized 1610), from the late 1560s Antonio’s devotional subjects became more expressive. Examples include Scenes from the Passion (? 1569; Paris, Louvre); frescoes of the Three Marys at the Tomb and a Pietà (Meda, near Milan, San Vittore); St. Jerome (Madrid, Museo del Prado), painted for El Escorial; and the Beheading of St. John the Baptist (1571; Milan, San Paolo Converso). In the Adoration of the Shepherds (1575; Santa Maria della Croce, Crema) the intimate devotional atmosphere is emphasized by the use of a nocturnal setting.

Apart from these experiments, Antonio’s activity in the 1570s included works of such diverse character as his stately signed Virgin with Saints (1575), now part of the main altar of San Pietro al Po in Cremona; the mannered St. Sebastian (1575; Milan, Sforza Castle); and the triptych of the Assumption (1577; Milan, San Marco), which recalls Brescian painting in its light and colour, as does the Adoration of the Magi (1579) in San Maurizio al Monastero Maggiore in Milan. He also completed the decoration of the transepts of San Pietro al Po in Cremona, with scenes from the Life of St. Peter (1575–9).

He then worked on important paintings in San Paolo Converso in Milan, including the Adoration of the Shepherds (1580) and the Martyrdom of St. Lawrence; both are interesting for their strong naturalism, which anticipates Caravaggio. From 1580 Campi served as architect for the Fabbrica del Duomo, (Cathedral Works), Cremona, for which he also painted the fresco of the Centurion Kneeling before Christ for the apse (in situ). This fresco, commissioned in 1582, was probably completed after a journey to Rome, where Antonio is said to have worked in the Vatican and been made a cavaliere aurato in 1583 by Pope Gregory XIII for his work as an architect.

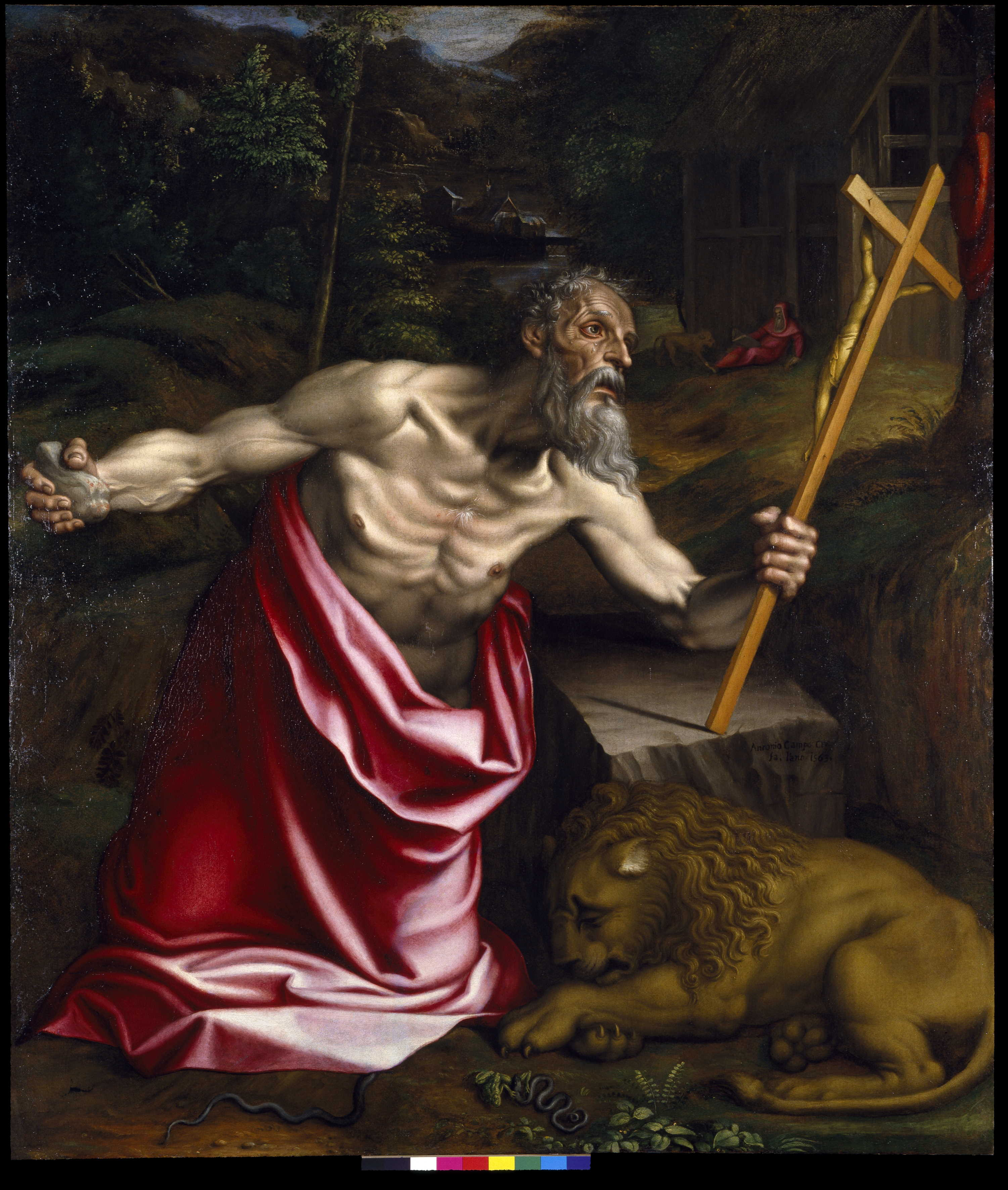
St. Jerome (1563)

Campi’s high standing in Cremona was confirmed with the publication of his important Cremona fedelissima in 1585, though a first incomplete edition had probably appeared in 1582. This is a history of the city illustrated with elaborate engravings. Antonio Campi’s last important paintings were done in Milan in the chapel of Santa Caterina in Sant'Angelo (in situ). These are the Martyrdom of St. Catherine (1583) and St. Catherine in Prison (1584); the former is characterized by formal devices and elaborate drapery, the latter by a masterly nocturnal play of light and shadow. A similar theatricality, although obtained here by the use of sotto in sù perspective, is found in the Presentation in the Temple (1586; ex-Milan, San Marco; San Francesco di Paola).

Also in 1586, with his brother Vincenzo Campi, Antonio began to paint the ceiling of San Paolo Converso, Milan. For this (in situ) he designed a false portico and an architectural backdrop by means of the quadratura devices for squaring up already used by Giulio Romano in Mantua and by his own brother, Giulio, in San Sigismondo, Cremona, and recently codified in the treatise by Giacomo Barozzi da Vignola, Le due regole della prospettiva practica (Rome, 1583). These advanced conceptions were probably sketched out by Antonio before his death and completed by his brother Vincenzo. Antonio Campi died in Cremona in January 1587. Among Antonio's pupils are Galeazzo Ghidoni, Ippolito Storto, Giovanni Battista Belliboni, and Giovanni Paolo Fondulo.

== Partial anthology of works ==
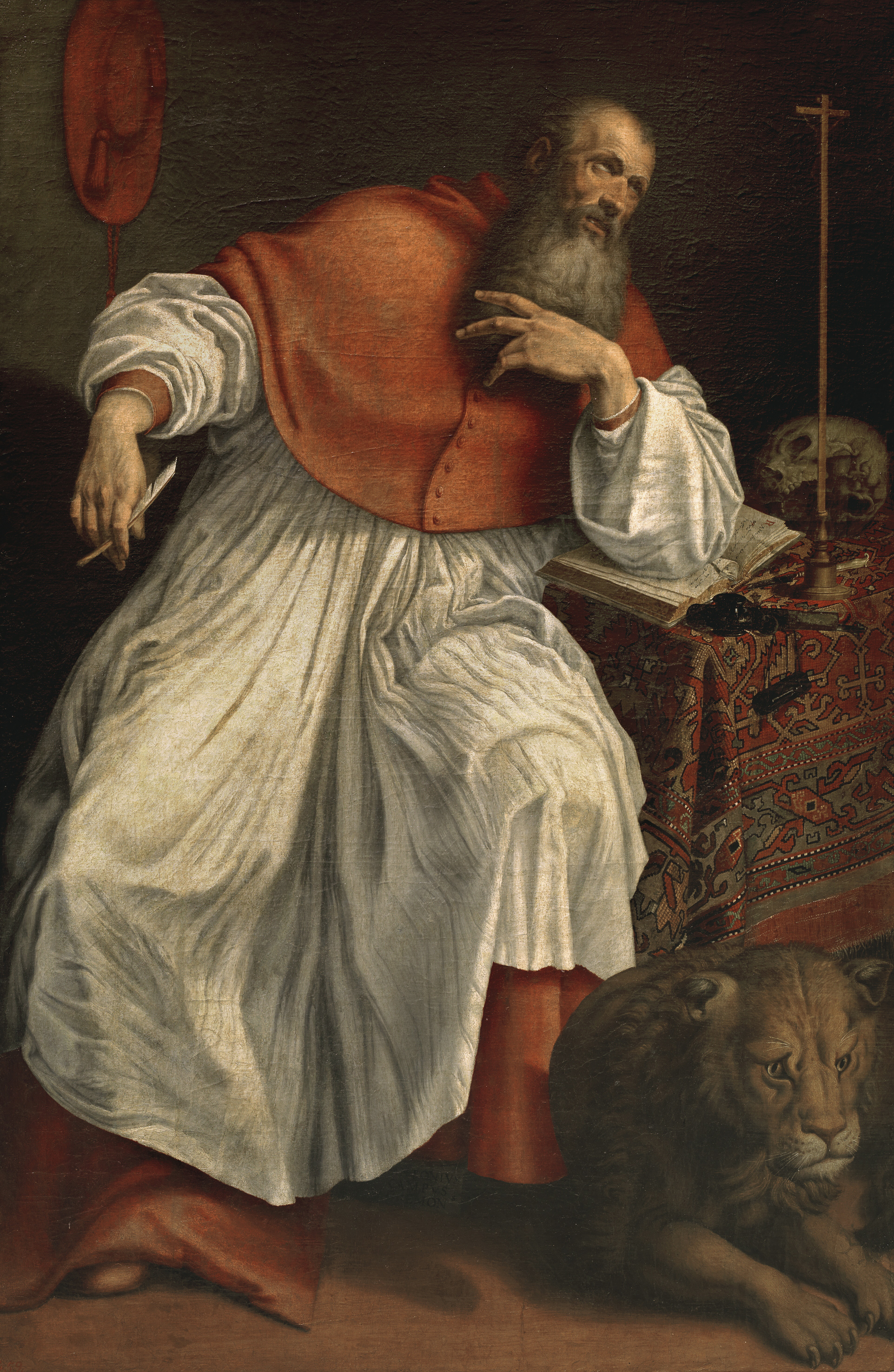
Saint Jerome (c. 1566), Madrid, Museo del Prado

- Gaius Mucius Scaevola (drawing of Roman voluntarily placing hand into fire), Los Angeles County Museum of Art;
- Stories of Justice, c. 1549, Palazzo della Loggia, Brescia; Pinacoteca Tosio Martinengo, Brescia; Museum of Fine Arts, Budapest;
- Saint Jerome (c. 1566), Madrid, Museo del Prado;
- Holy Family, 1567, Cremona, San Pietro al Po;
- Scenes from the Passion, ? 1569, Paris, Louvre;
- Beheading of St. John the Baptist, 1571, San Paolo Converso, Milan;
- St. Sebastian, 1575, Milan, Sforza Castle;
- Assumption, 1577, Milan, San Marco;
- Adoration of the Magi, 1579, San Maurizio al Monastero Maggiore, Milan;
- Adoration of the Shepherds, 1580, San Paolo Converso, Milan;
- The Martyrdom of Saint Lawrence, 1581, San Paolo Converso, Milan;
- The Martyrdom of St. Catherine, 1583, Santa Caterina in Sant'Angelo, Milan;
- St. Catherine in Prison, 1584, Santa Caterina in Sant'Angelo, Milan;
- Presentation in the Temple, 1586, San Francesco di Paola.
Paintings by Antonio Campi

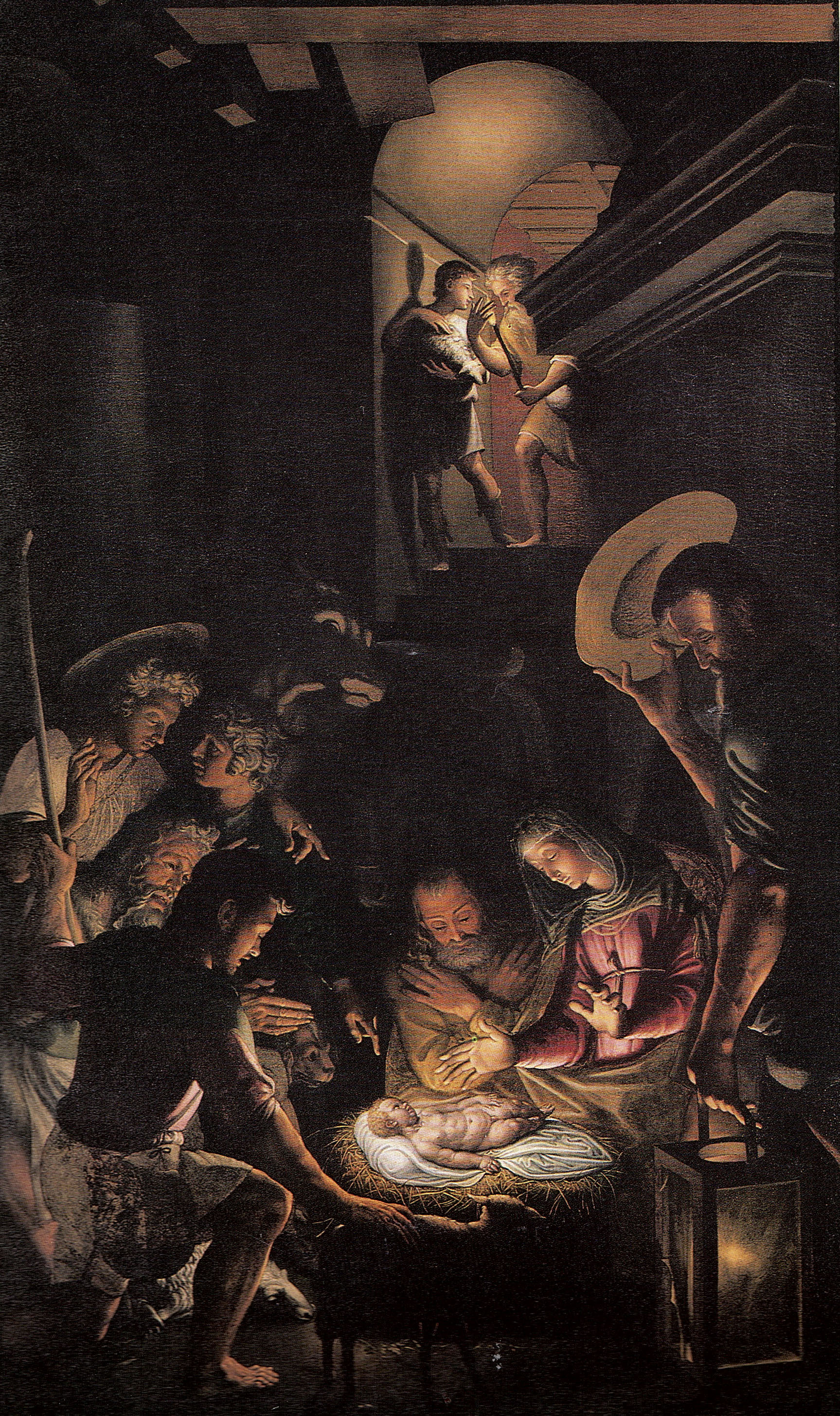
Adoration of the Shepherds, Santa Maria della Croce, Crema

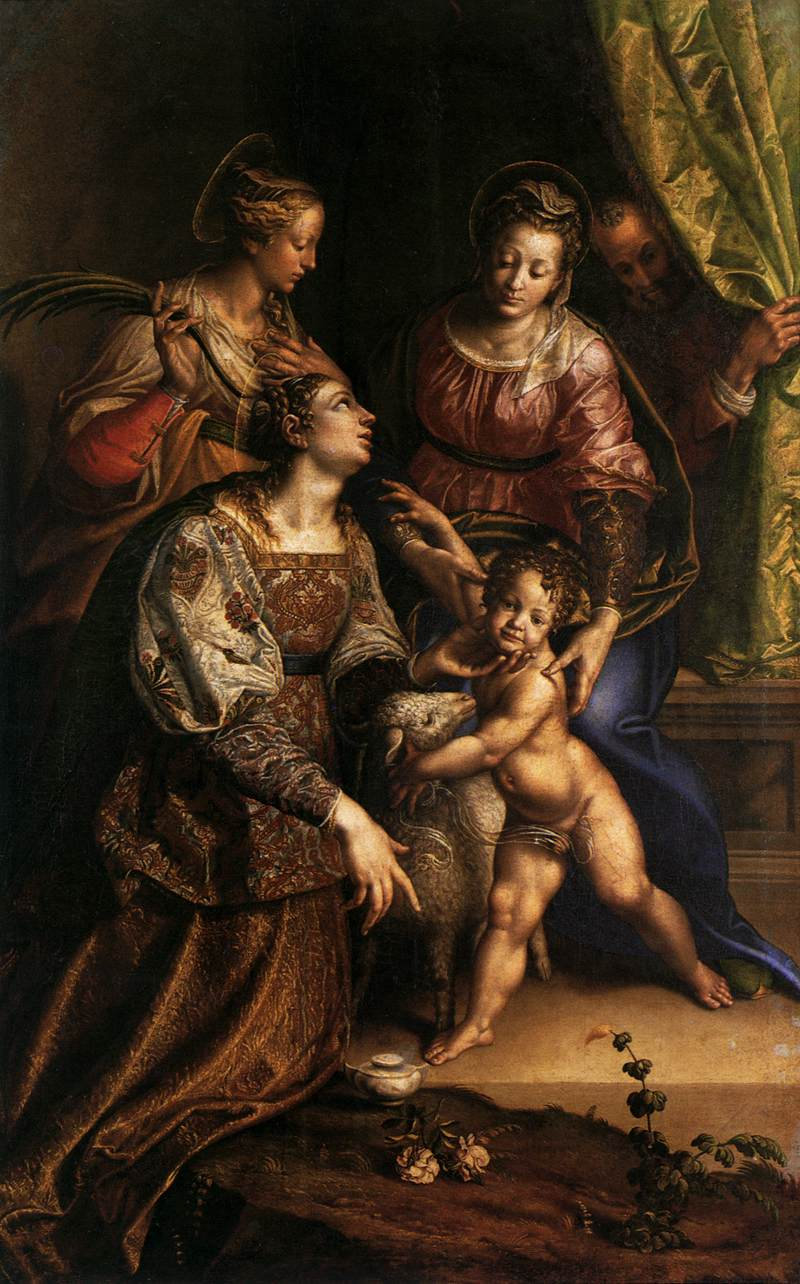
Virgin and Child with Saints, Pinacoteca di Brera, Milan

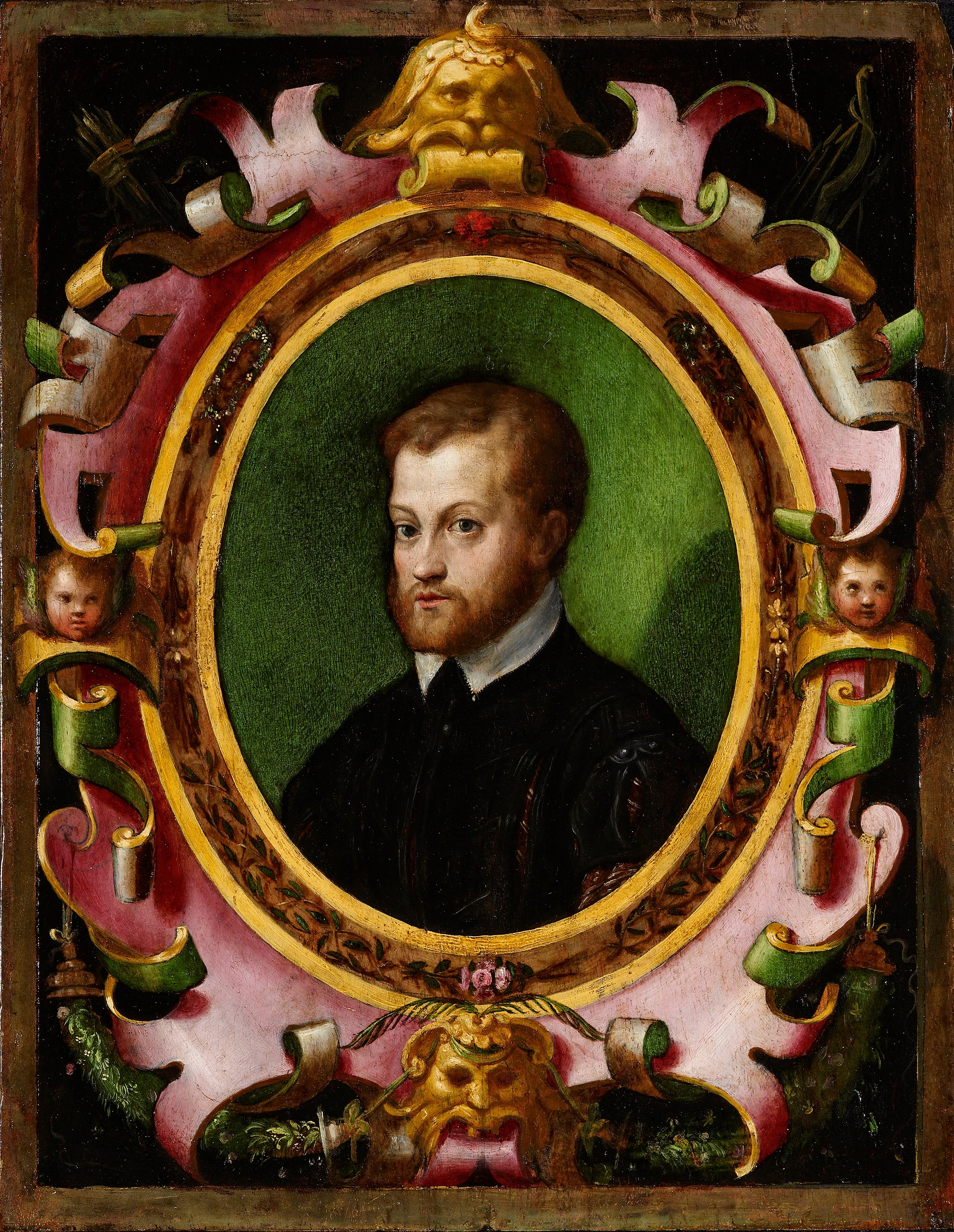
Portrait of a Gentleman, Trinity Fine Art, London

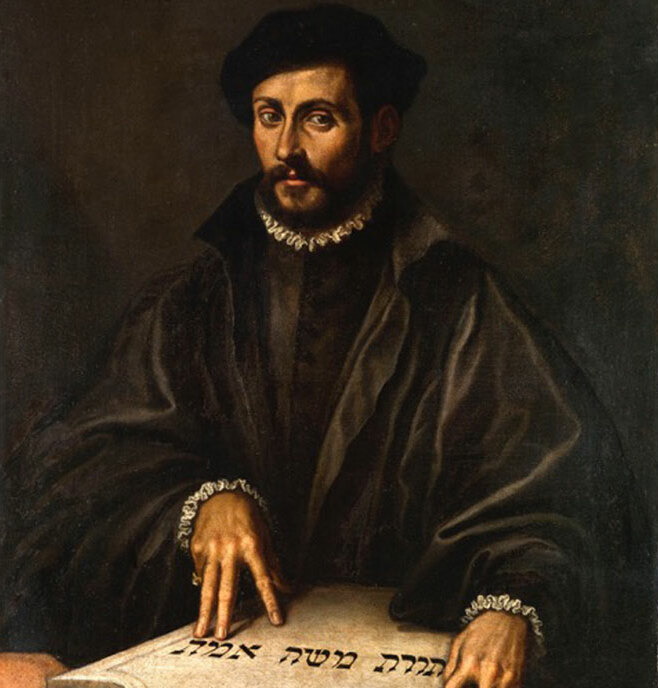
Portrait of a Man Pointing at a Hebrew Tablet

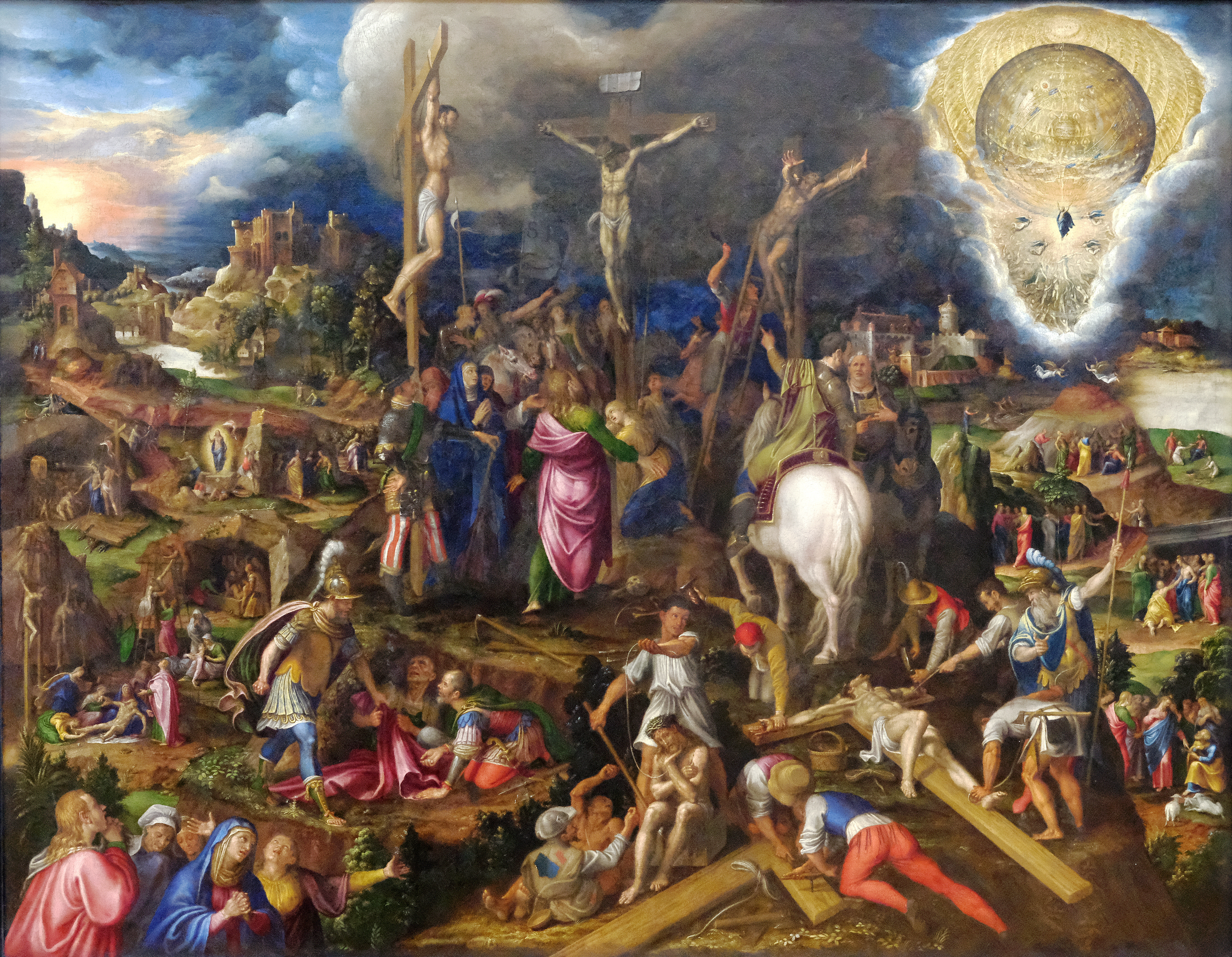
The Mystery of the Passion of Christ, Paris, Louvre
