= Agostino De Fondulis =

Italian sculptor and architect (fl. 1483–1522)

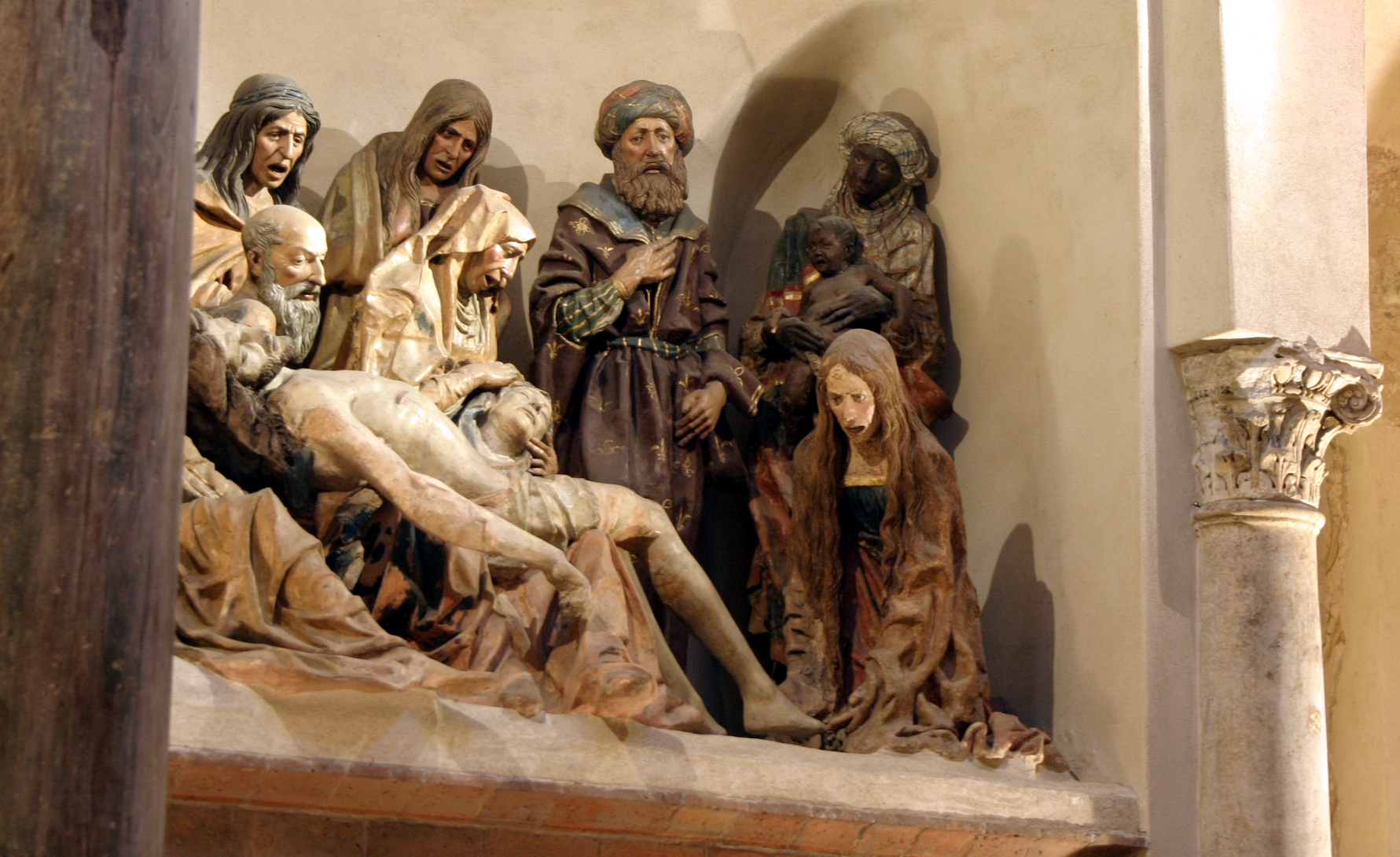
The "Lamentation over the Dead Christ", Santa Maria presso San Satiro, Milan.

Agostino de Fondulis (fl. 1483–1522) was an Italian sculptor and architect active in Lombardy.

He was probably born in Crema, where his family had a workshop. Later he moved to Padua.

De Fondulis' most famous work is the "Lamentation over the Dead Christ", a terracotta group in the church of Santa Maria presso San Satiro in Milan. The church was being rebuilt by Bramante and Giovanni Antonio Amadeo, and de Fonduli also provided the terracotta decoration of the sacristy, including a frieze with heads of prophets.

The quality of his work on Santa Maria presso San Satiro, and his collaboration with Amadeo, led to his getting valuable further commissions. His other works include statues of the Apostles for the dome of Santa Maria presso San Celso (1502), the Palazzo Landi in Piacenza, the Sanctuary of the Misericordia in Castelleone (1513) and the church of Mary Magdalene in Crema. For the last church he produced another Lamentation, which is now in the Pieve of Palazzo Pignano).
