= Giovanni Battagio =

Italian sculptor and architect

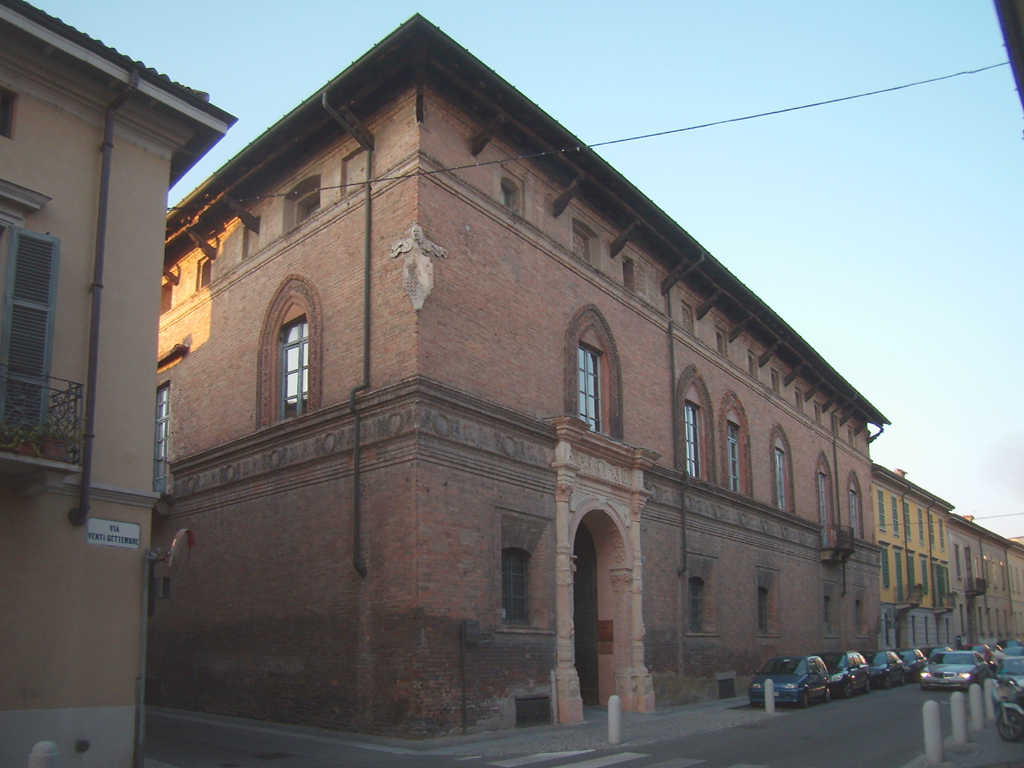
Palazzo Mozzanica in Lodi.

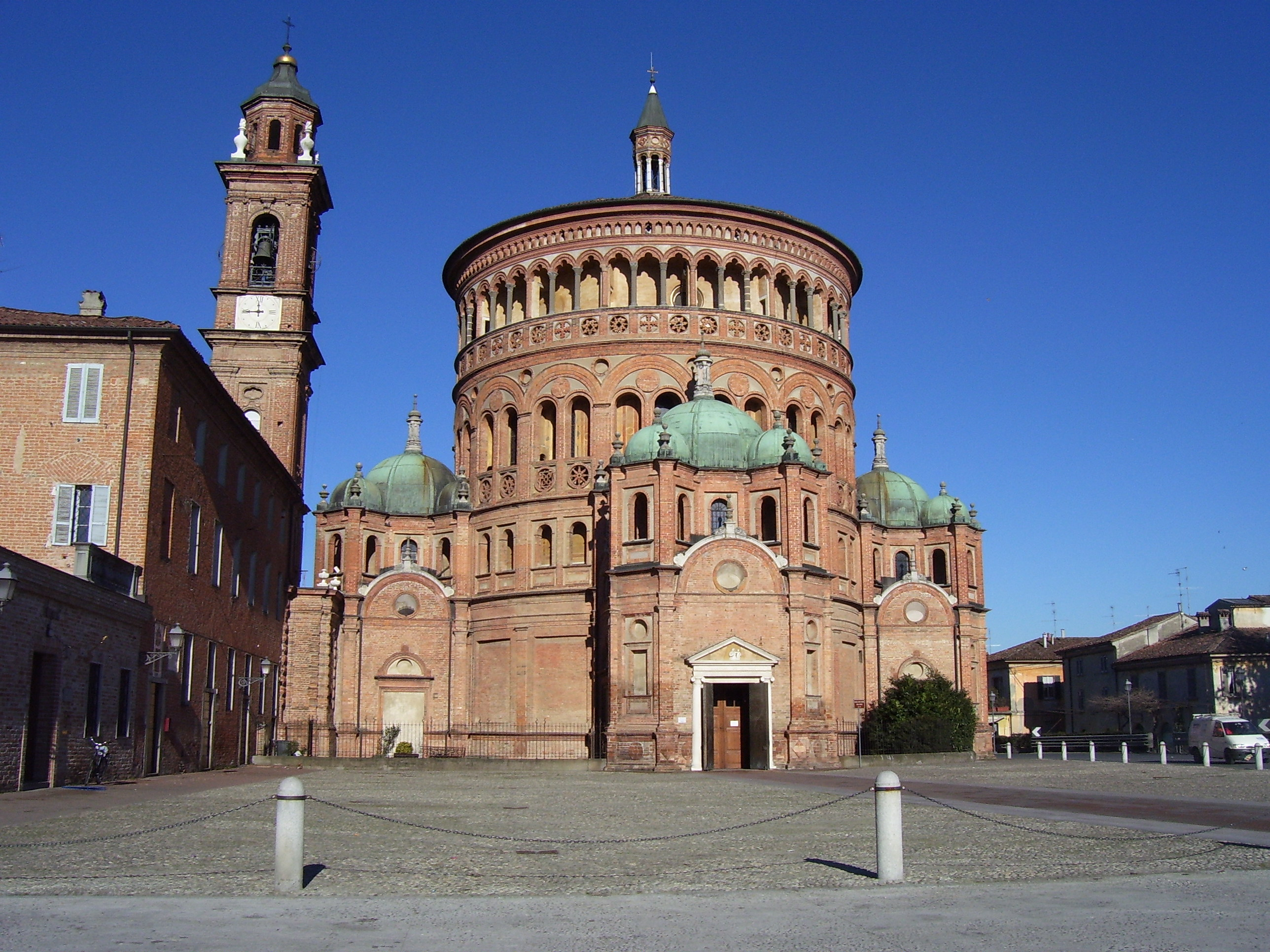
Santa Maria della Croce.

Giovanni Battagio was an Italian Renaissance sculptor and architect. He was born in Lodi, Italy.

A follower of Giovanni Antonio Amadeo, from 1483 he worked on Santa Maria presso San Satiro and other buildings in Milan.

He designed the Sanctuary of Santa Maria della Croce in Crema. He also designed the Tempio Civico dell'Incoronata in Lodi, one of the masterworks of the Renaissance in Lombardy.
