= Albertino Piazza =

Italian painter

Alberto or Albertino Piazza (1490–1528) was an Italian painter. He was born and died in Lodi, Lombardy. His elder brother Martino was also a painter.
