= Martino Piazza =

Italian painter

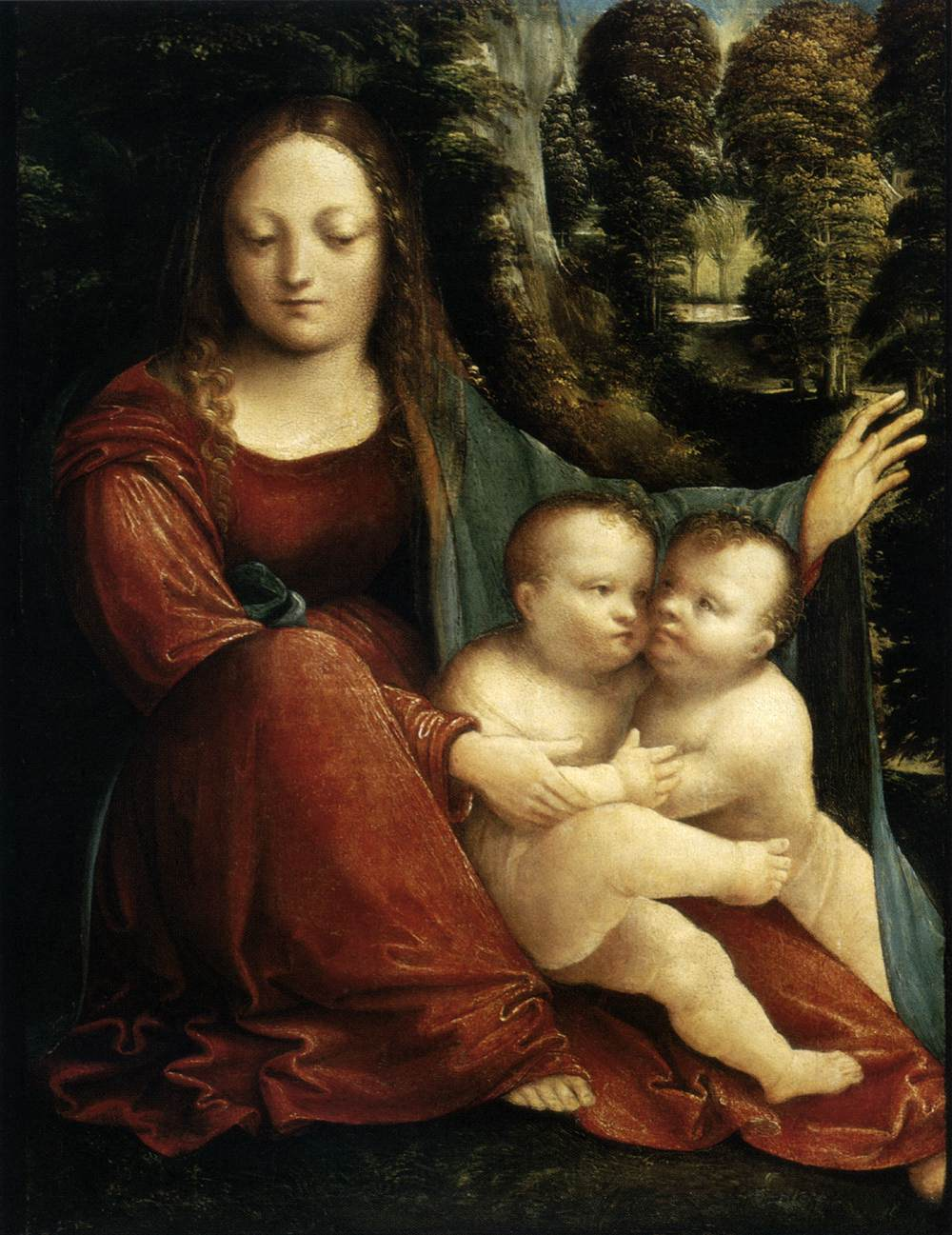
Madonna and Child with the Infant St John by Martino Piazza, Museum of Fine Arts (Budapest)

Martino Piazza, also Martino de' Toccagni, (1475-80 - 1523) was an Italian Renaissance painter.

Not much is known about Piazza's life except through his works. He worked in Lodi, Lombardy in conjunction with his brother Albertino Piazza who was also a painter. One work executed by both brothers Saint John the Baptist in the Desert can be found at the National Gallery. His son, Callisto Piazza (c. 1500–1562) was also a painter.
