= Galeazzo Ghidoni =

Italian painter

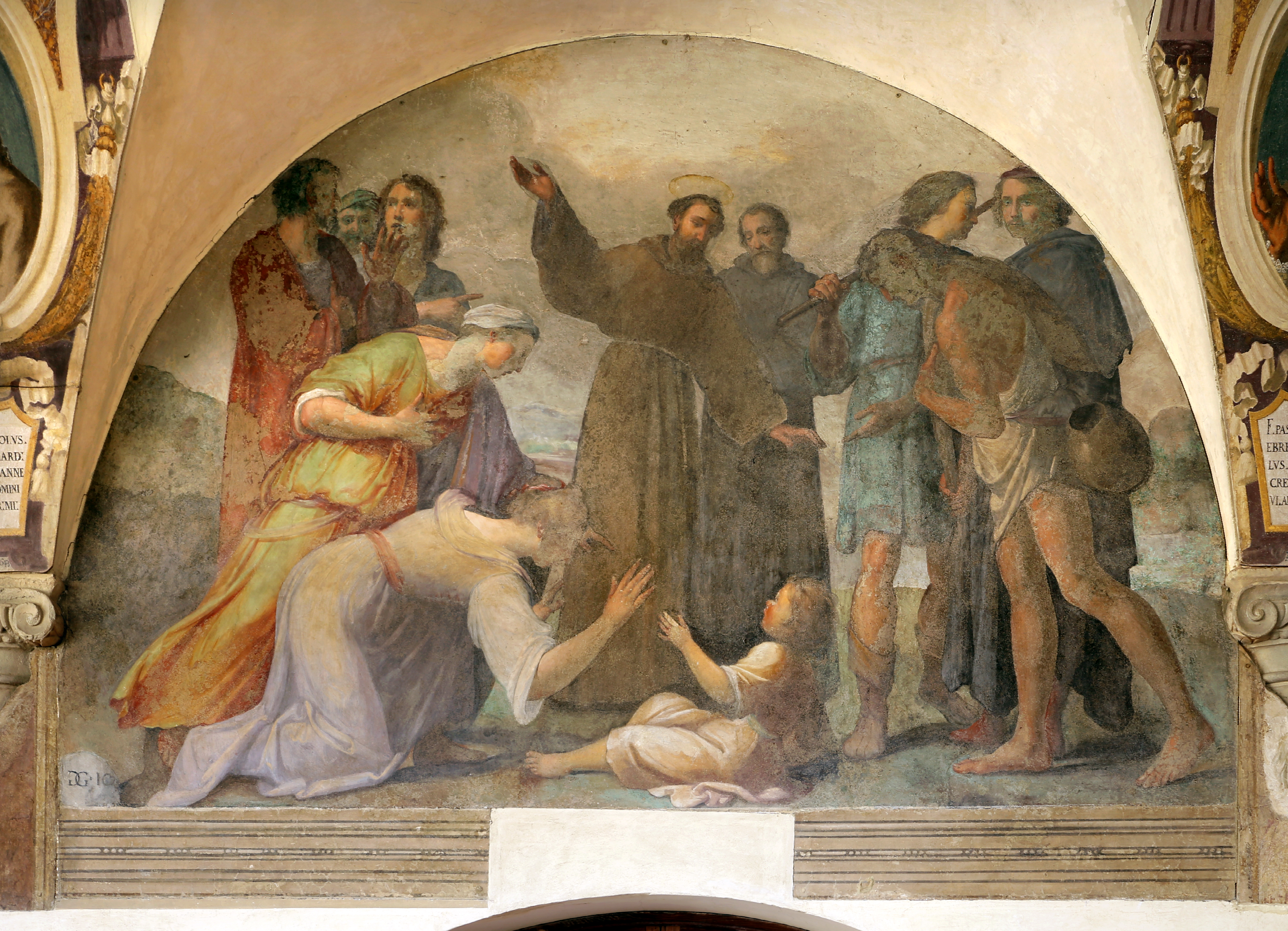
Resurrection of the Drowned Child, c. 1620–25, by Galeazzo Ghidoni

Galeazzo Ghidoni or Gidoni (Cremona, late 16th century - early 17th century) was an Italian painter.

== Biography ==
He was a pupil in Cremona of Antonio Campi. His first activity in Cremona is documented by 1583. His San Giovanni Battista preaching to the crowds (1598) was once in the now destroyed church of San Mattia of Cremona. He was later active in Florence (Cloister of the Ognissanti) and Rome in the early 17th century. His two sons Giovanni Battista and Vicenzo Gidoni were painters in Florence.
