= Bernardino Campi =

Italian painter

Bernadino Campi
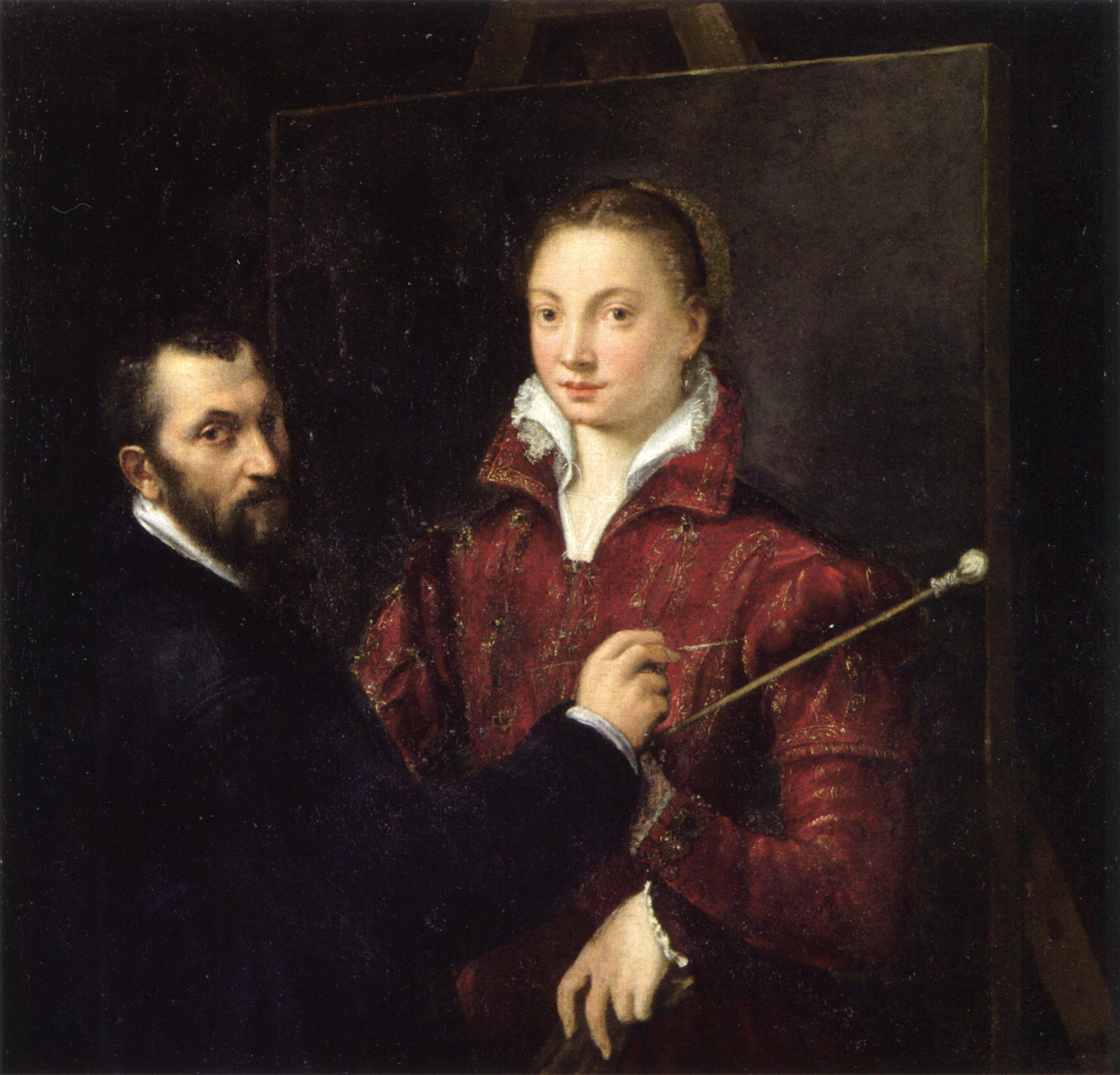
- Sofonisba Anguissola, Bernardino Campi Painting a Portrait of Sofonisba Anguissola Anguissola, c. late 1550s.
- Born: 1522; Reggio Emilia
- Died: 18 August 1591 (aged 68–69); Reggio Emilia
- Occupation: Painter

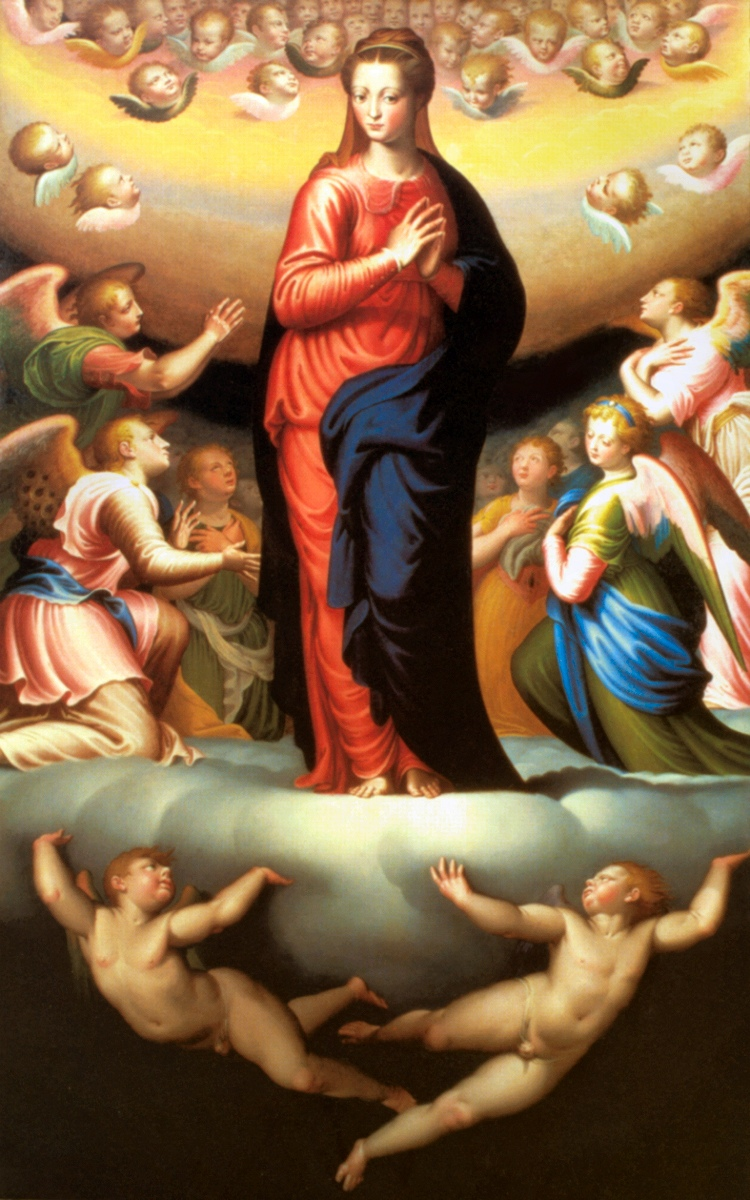
Madonna in Glory by Bernardino Campi

Bernadino Campi (1522–1591) was an Italian Renaissance painter from Cremona, who worked in Reggio Emilia. He is known as one of the teachers of Sofonisba Anguissola and of Giovanni Battista Trotti (il Malosso). In Cremona, his extended family owned the main artistic studios. Giulio Campi and Antonio Campi, half-brothers, were distant relatives of Bernardino; the latter is generally considered the most talented of the family. All were active and prominent painters locally. Influences on Bernardino include local Cremonese such as Camillo Boccaccino and artists from neighbouring regions such as Correggio, Parmigianino and Giulio Romano. He made a number of sets of copies of the Eleven Caesars by Titian, then in the Gonzaga collection, adding one of Domitian, which he based on a work by Giulio Romano. Titian's originals were all lost in an 18th-century fire in Madrid.

Bernardino was commissioned by Vespasiano Gonzaga to lead a team of artists including Pietro Martire Pesenti in the interior decoration, including frescoes by Bernardino, of the Palazzo del Giardino in Sabbioneta, near Mantua.

Among his pupils were Giovanni Antonio Morandi (active 1585), Andrea Mainardi, and Pietro Martire Pesenti, both active in the Palazzo of Guastalla.

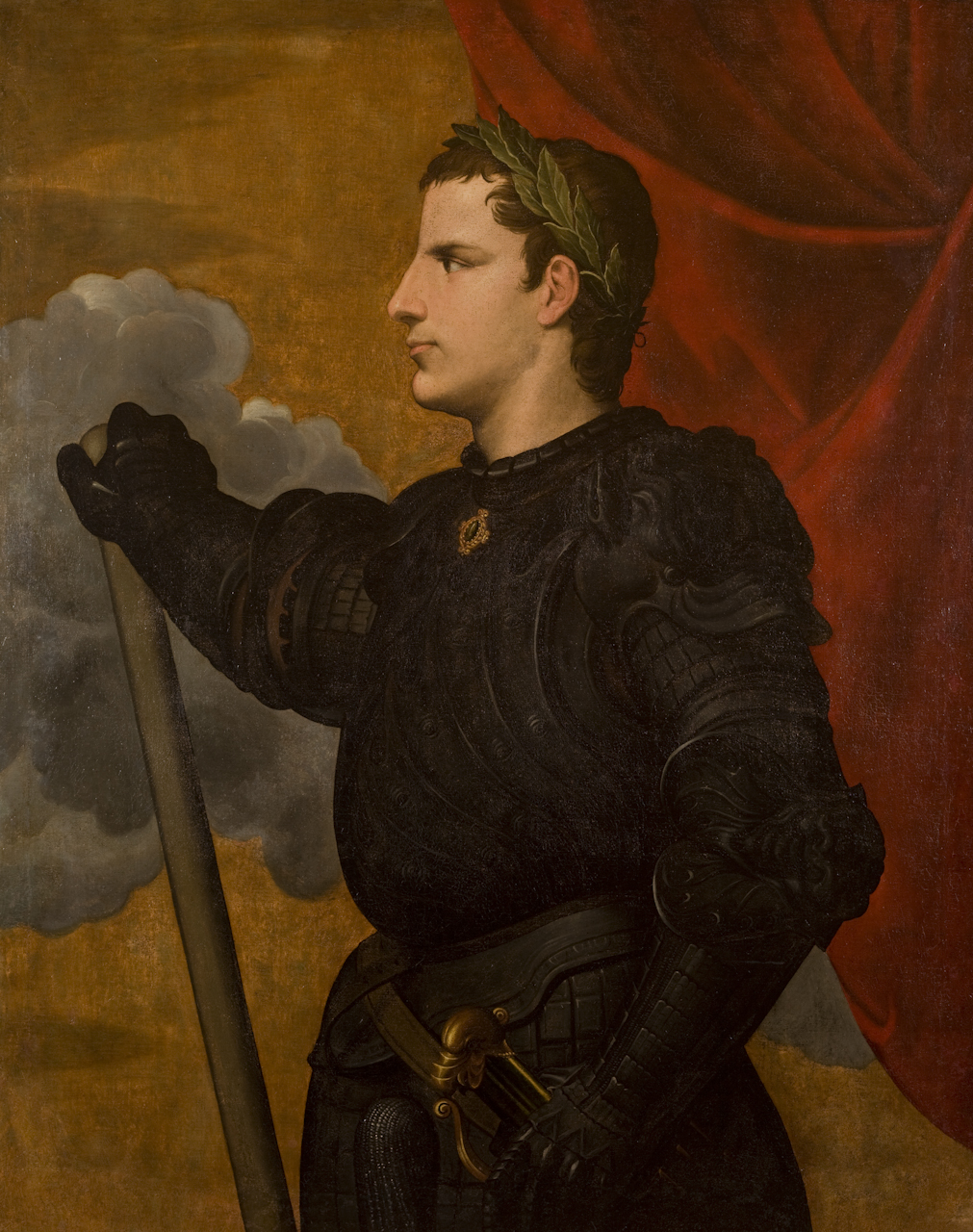
Emperor Claudius by Bernardino Campi, after the lost painting by Titian

== Bibliography ==
- R. Miller, in (I Campi. 500 Years of Cremonese Artistic Culture (I Campi. Cultura artistica cremonese del 500), a cura di M. Gregori, Milan, 1985, pp. 154–170
- Freedberg, Sydney J. (1993). Painting in Italy, 1500-1600. Penguin Books Ltd. pp. 583 & 590–1.
- M. Tanzi, I Campi, Milan, 2005
