= Giulio Campi =

Italian painter

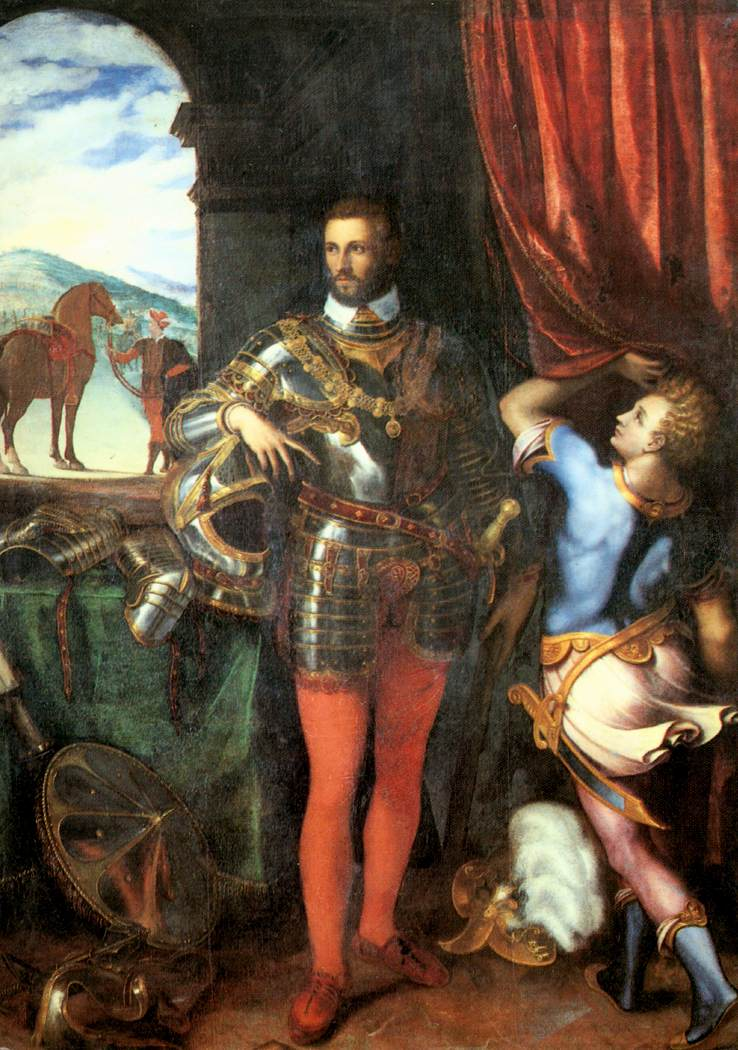
- Portrait of Ottavio Farnese.
- Born: 1502; Cremona
- Died: 5 March 1572 (aged 69–70); Cremona
- Occupation: artist

Giulio Campi (1502 – 5 March 1572) was an Italian painter and architect. His brothers Vincenzo Campi and Antonio Campi were also renowned painters.

== Biography ==
The eldest of a family of prominent painters, Campi was born at Cremona. His father Galeazzo (1475–1536) taught him the first lessons in art.

In 1522, in Mantua, he studied painting, architecture, and modelling under Giulio Romano. He visited Rome, became an ardent student of the antique, and like Bernardino — distantly related to him — he combined a Lombard and Roman traditions. He collaborated on some works with Camillo Boccaccino, the son of Boccaccio Boccaccino, with whom Campi may also have received training.

He died in Cremona in 1572.

== Works ==
Campi is called the "Ludovico Carracci of Cremona" for his influence, since Campi was as influential during the Renaissance in Cremona as the latter was on the Baroque school of Bologna. According to the 1913 Catholic Encyclopedia, "His numerous paintings are grandly and reverently conceived, freely drawn, vigorously coloured, lofty in style, and broadly handled. He was animated in all his work by a deep piety."

When he was 27, Giulio executed a Virgin and Child with Sts Celsus and Nazarus for the church of Sant'Abondio. This painting is regarded as his masterpiece; the Catholic Encyclopedia praises it as "masterly in the freedom of its drawing and in the splendour of its color."

Many of his fresco works are housed in churches of Cremona, Mantua, Milan and in the church of Saint Margaret's, in his native town. These include:

- The Chess Game
- Descent from the Cross in San Sigismondo at Cremona
- the frescoes in the dome of San Girolamo at Mantua

He was involved in the reconstruction and decoration of the church of Santa Rita in Cremona. An altar-piece in San Sigismondo and his Labours of Hercules were engraved by Giorgio Ghisi.
