= The Chess Game =

Painting by Giulio Campi

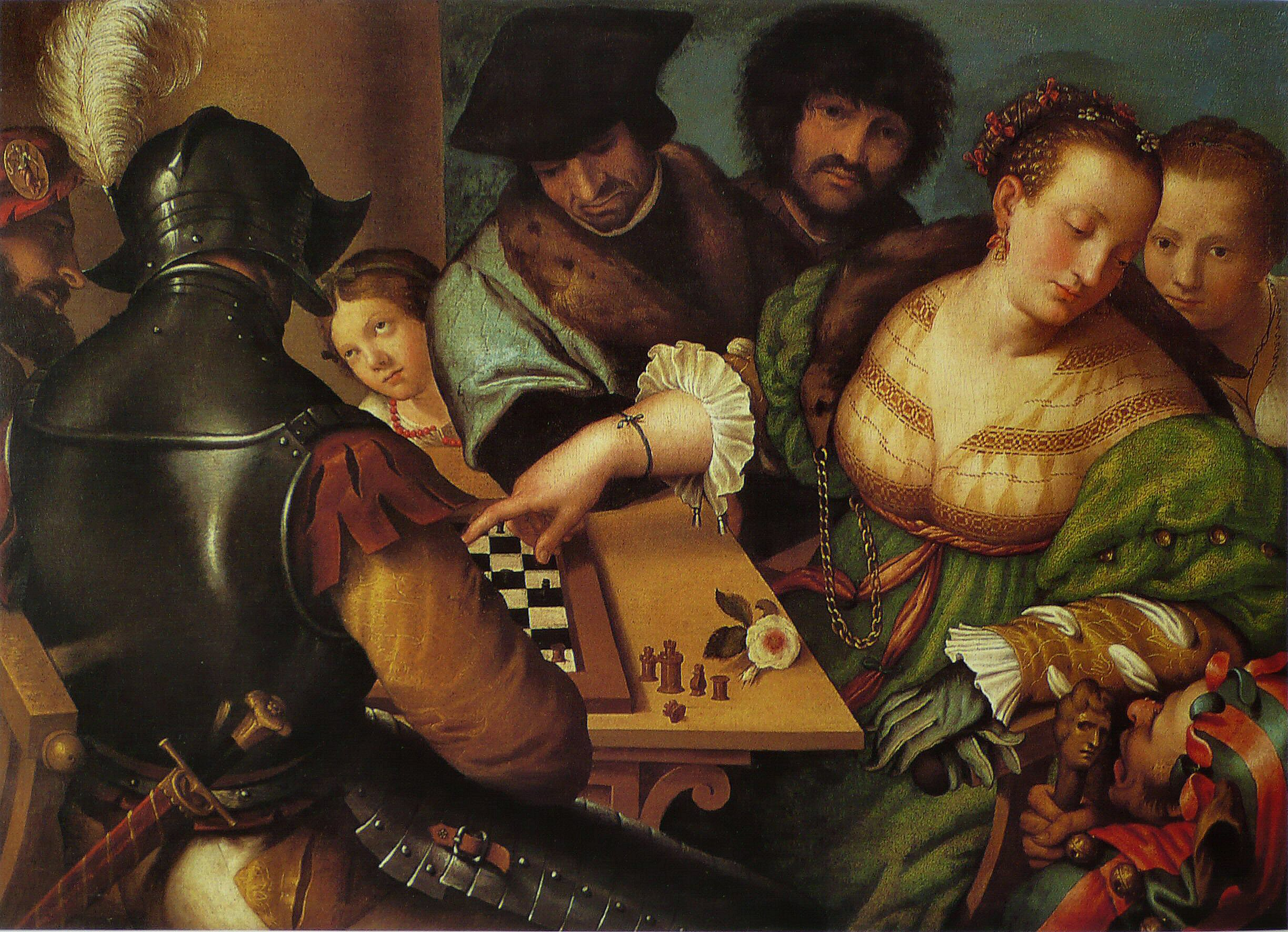
- Artist: Giulio Campi
- Year: c. 1530
- Medium: Oil on panel
- Dimensions: 90 cm × 127 cm (35 in × 50 in)
- Location: Museo Civico d'Arte Antica, Turin

The Chess Game is a painting of c. 1530 by Giulio Campi, a Renaissance painter from Cremona. Since 1970, it has been in the Museo Civico d'Arte Antica in Turin.

It was first published in 1963 by Roberto Longhi whilst still in the Nigro collection in Genoa. He attributed it to Sofonisba Anguissola but mentioned similarities to Campi's Allegory in the Museo Poldi Pezzoli in Milan. Mina Gregori attributed the work to Campi by comparison with a portrait by Giulio of his father Galeazzo in the Uffizi.

== Bibliography ==
- (in Italian) Giovanni Godi and Giuseppe Cirillo, Studi su Giulio Campi, Milan, Arte Lombarda, 1978, SBN IT\ICCU\NAP\0095755.
- (in Italian) I Campi: cultura artistica cremonese del Cinquecento, Milan, Electa, 1985, pp. 133–134, SBN IT\ICCU\PAL\0002579. Edited by Mina Gregori.
- (in Italian) Various authors, Sofonisba Anguissola e le sue sorelle, Milan, Leonardo arte, 1994, SBN IT\ICCU\VEA\0063954. Catalogue of an exhibition held in Cremona in 1994 and in Vienna and Washington in 1995.
- (in Italian) Bert W. Meijer, 'Cremona e i Paesi Bassi', in I Campi: cultura artistica cremonese del Cinquecento, Milan, Electa, 1994, pp. 25–32, SBN IT\ICCU\PAL\0002579. Edited by Mina Gregori. Catalogue of an exhibition held in Cremona in 1994 and in Vienna and Washington in 1995.
