= Lorenzo Beci =

Italian painter

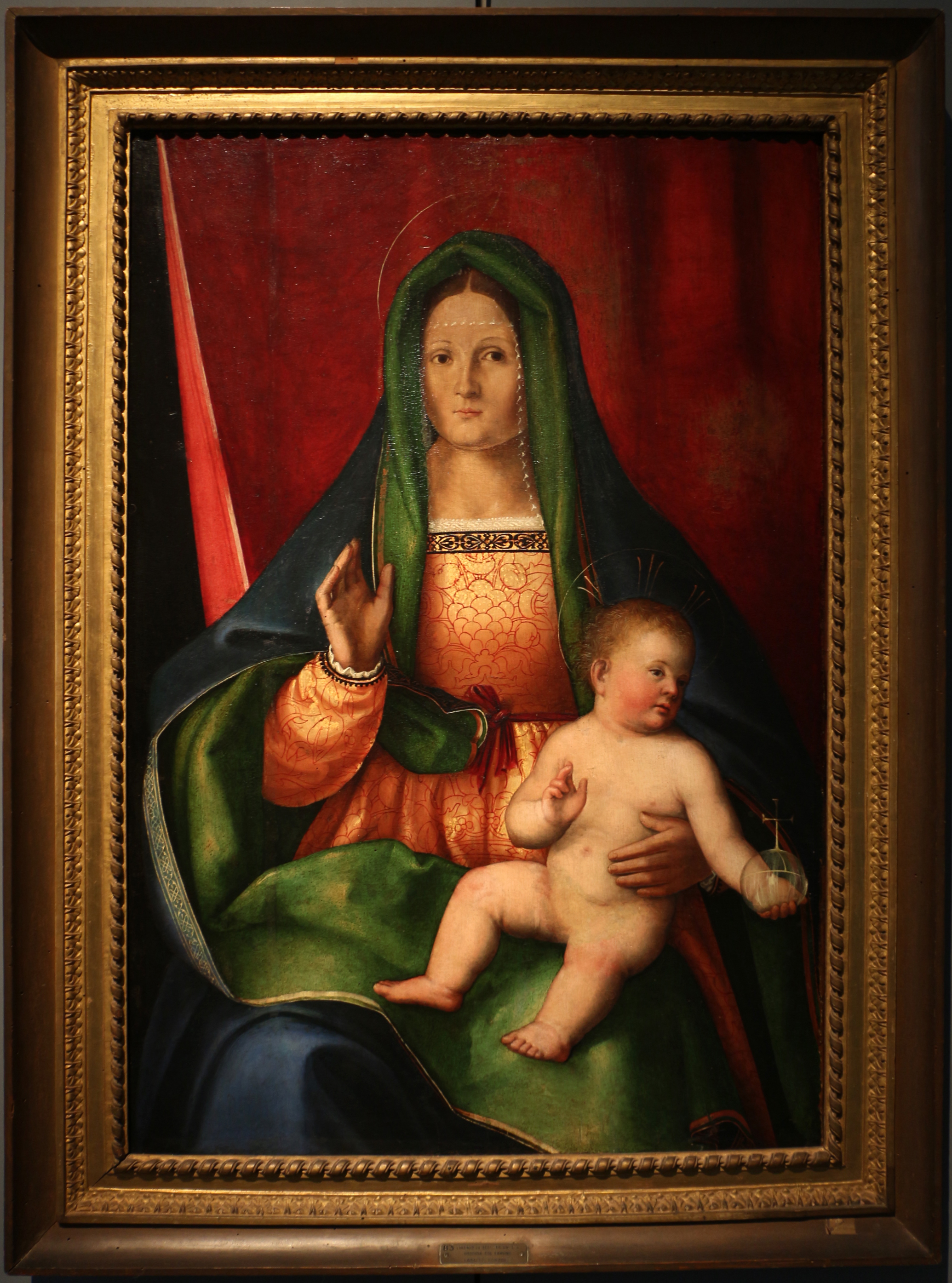
Madonna and Child

Lorenzo Beci (active 1517–1521) is an Italian painter of the Renaissance period, active in Cremona, region of Lombardy. His surname is also sometimes written as Becci, Berti, De Becis or De Bezy, Berci, or Bezzi.

== Biography ==
He is said to have been a pupil of Galeazzo Campi. It is unclear if he is related to Zanino de Becis, also a Cremonese painter. Two paintings in oil on wood derived from a former church in Binanuova are now in the church of San Pancrazio, Gabbioneta-Binanuova.
