= Fish Market (Joachim Beuckelaer) =

1568 painting by Joachim Beuckelaer

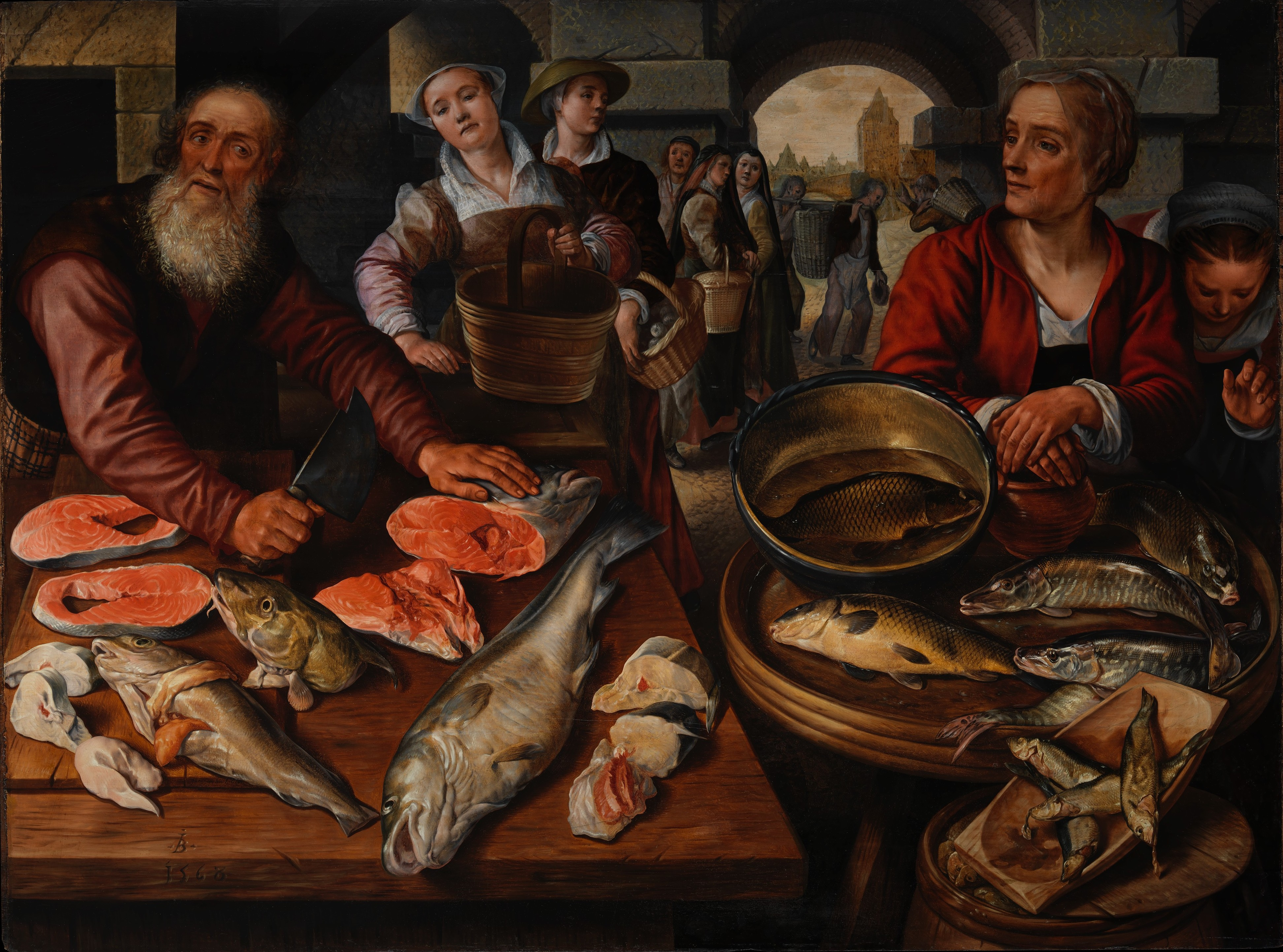
- Artist: Joachim Beuckelaer
- Year: 1568
- Medium: Oil on wood
- Dimensions: 128.6 cm × 174.9 cm (50.6 in × 68.9 in)
- Location: Metropolitan Museum of Art; New York City

Fish Market is a 1568 painting by the Flemish artist Joachim Beuckelaer in the collection of the Metropolitan Museum of Art. Executed in oil on wood (Baltic oak), the work depicts a bustling fish market.

Painted during the waning years of the religious iconoclasm of the Beeldenstorm, the painting reflects the shift in Netherlandish art from religious to secular themes.
