= San Sigismondo, Cremona =

Church building in Cremona, Italy

Coordinates: 45°7′32.24″N 10°3′14.33″E

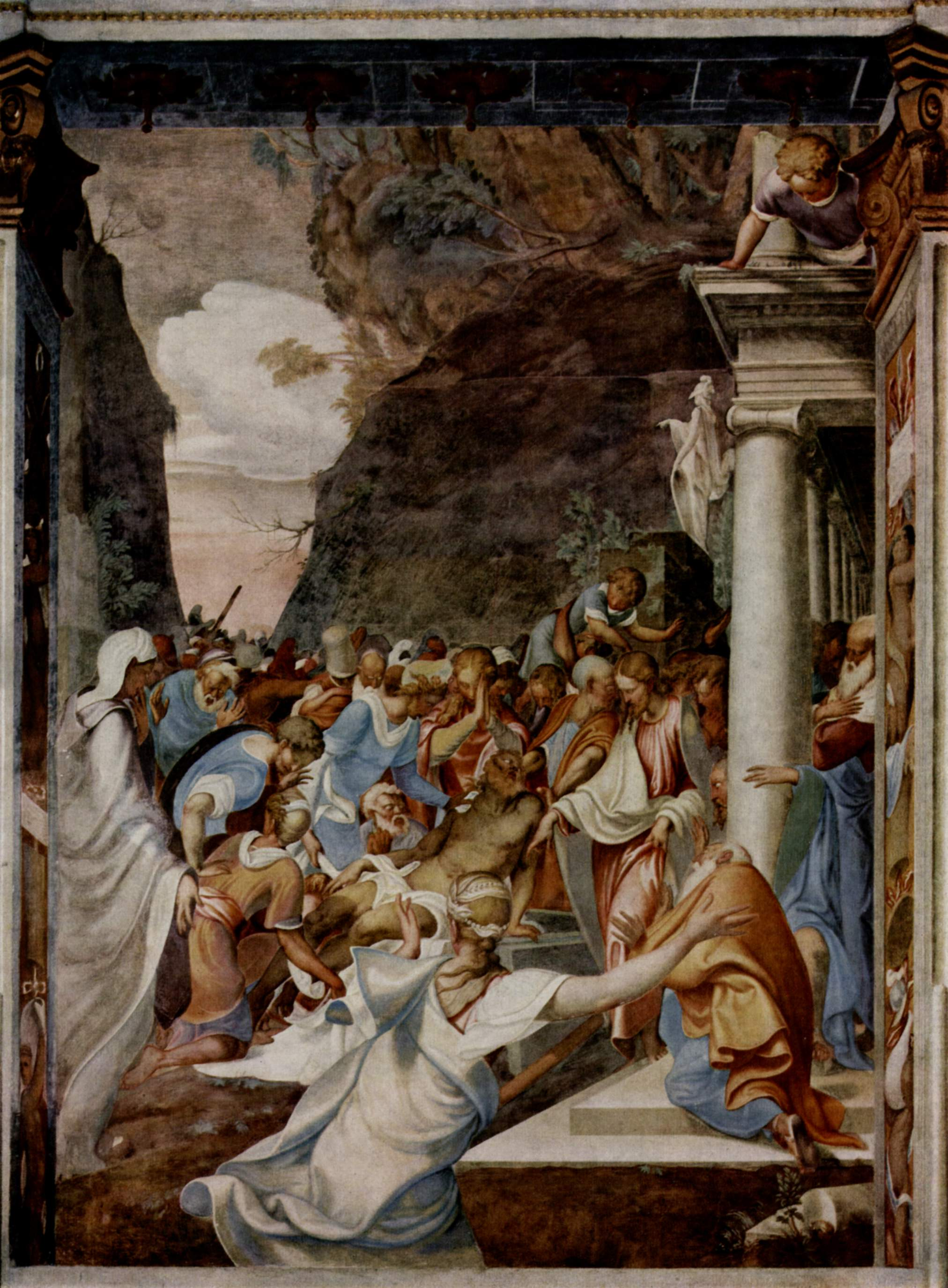
The Resurrection of Lazarus, by Camillo Boccaccino.

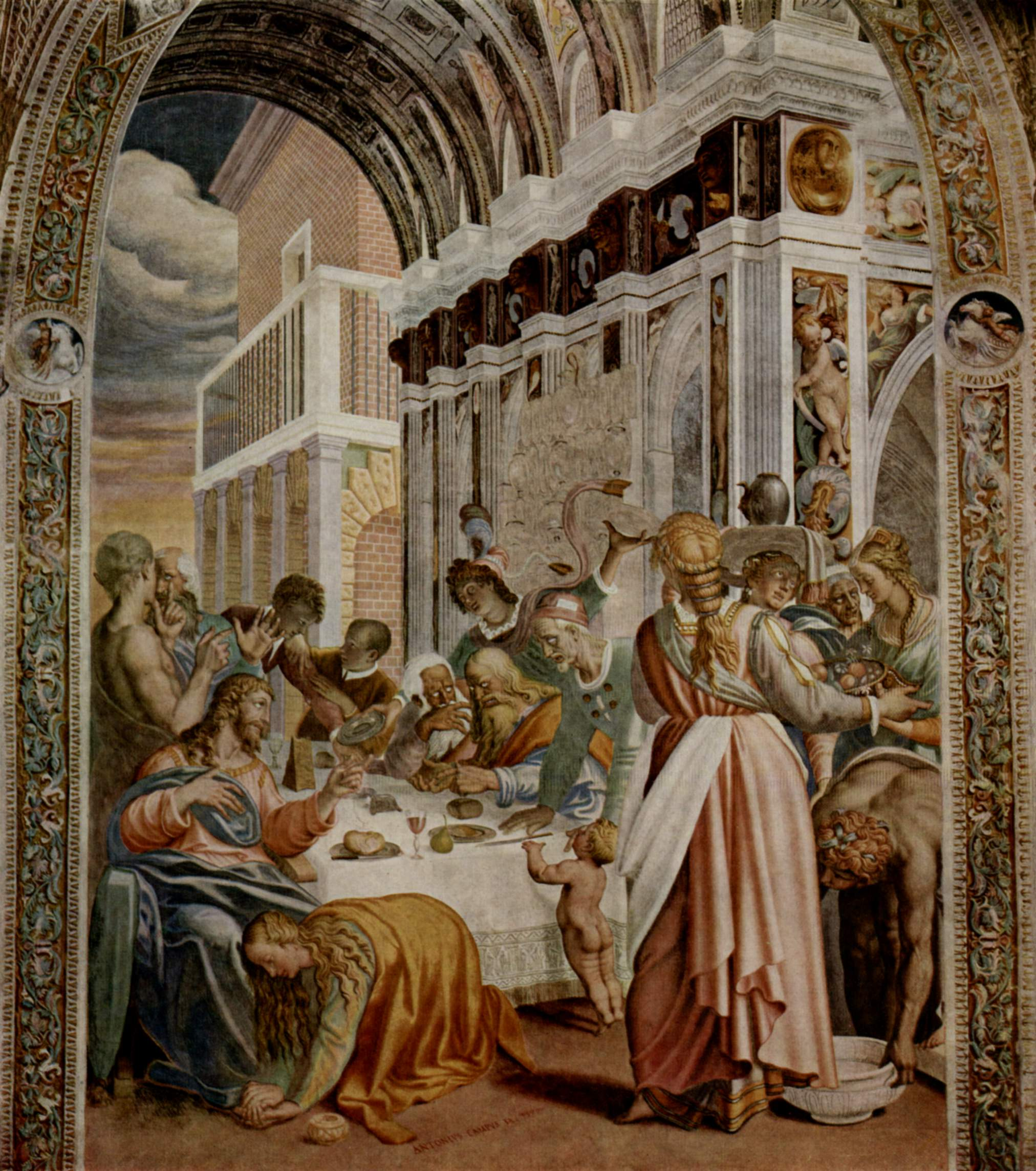
Antonio Campi, Christ at the home of Simon the Pharisee

San Sigismondo is a Roman Catholic religious complex in Cremona, northern Italy. It is located some 2 km outside the historical centre of the city.

== History ==
The monastery was founded on 10 June 1463 to celebrate the union between the previously rival families of the Visconti and the Sforza, who had contended for the rule in the Duchy of Milan. An inscription near the high altar reads: "Here Francesco Sforza, Duke of Milan, joined in marriage Biancamaria daughter of Filippo Visconti: this as habit it meant, and with the word and the ring in the year 1447".

The building was designed by the ducal military engineer, Bartolomeo Gadio. The church has a façade divided in two storeys by an entablature supported by four fake columns in Doric style, which are surmounted by a tympanum and five small spires. The entrance, over which is a rose window, is supported by two Ionic columns with a Baroque flavour.

The interior is on the Latin Cross plan, with a nave and six chapels on each side. It houses artworks from the Campi brothers, Bernardino Gatti, Giacomo Bertesi and Gabriele Capra. The frescoes of Bernardino in the cupola are considered among his masterpieces.

The bell tower is octagonal in plan, the upper part being cylindrical in shape.
