= Vincenzo Campi =

Italian painter (c.1530/1535–1591)

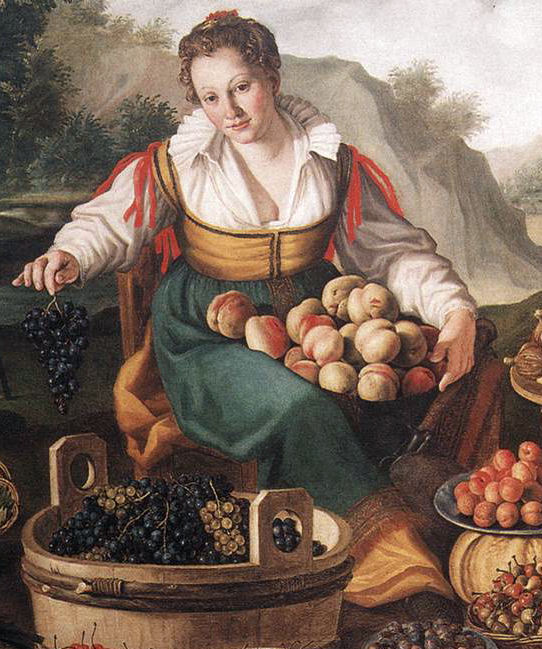
Vincenzo Campi, The Fruit Seller (detail), 1580, oil on canvas, 145 x 215 cm, Pinacoteca di Brera, Milan

Vincenzo Campi (Italian pronunciation: [vinˈtʃɛntso ˈkampi]; c.1530/1535–1591) was a 16th-century Italian painter working in Cremona during the Late Renaissance. Campi is best known as one of the first northern Italian artists to work in the Flemish style of realist genre painting.

== Early career ==
Campi was born into a family of prominent artists. He was the son of Italian Renaissance painter Galeazzo Campi, and younger brother of painters Giulio and Antonio. Vincenzo and Antonio are thought to have trained in the workshop of their older brother Giulio, a prominent painter and architect working in Cremona. Few records exist of Vincenzo's early years, with the first record of the artist's work being a portrait (now lost) of Archduke Ernest and his brother Rudolf of Austria painted during their stay in Cremona during 1563.

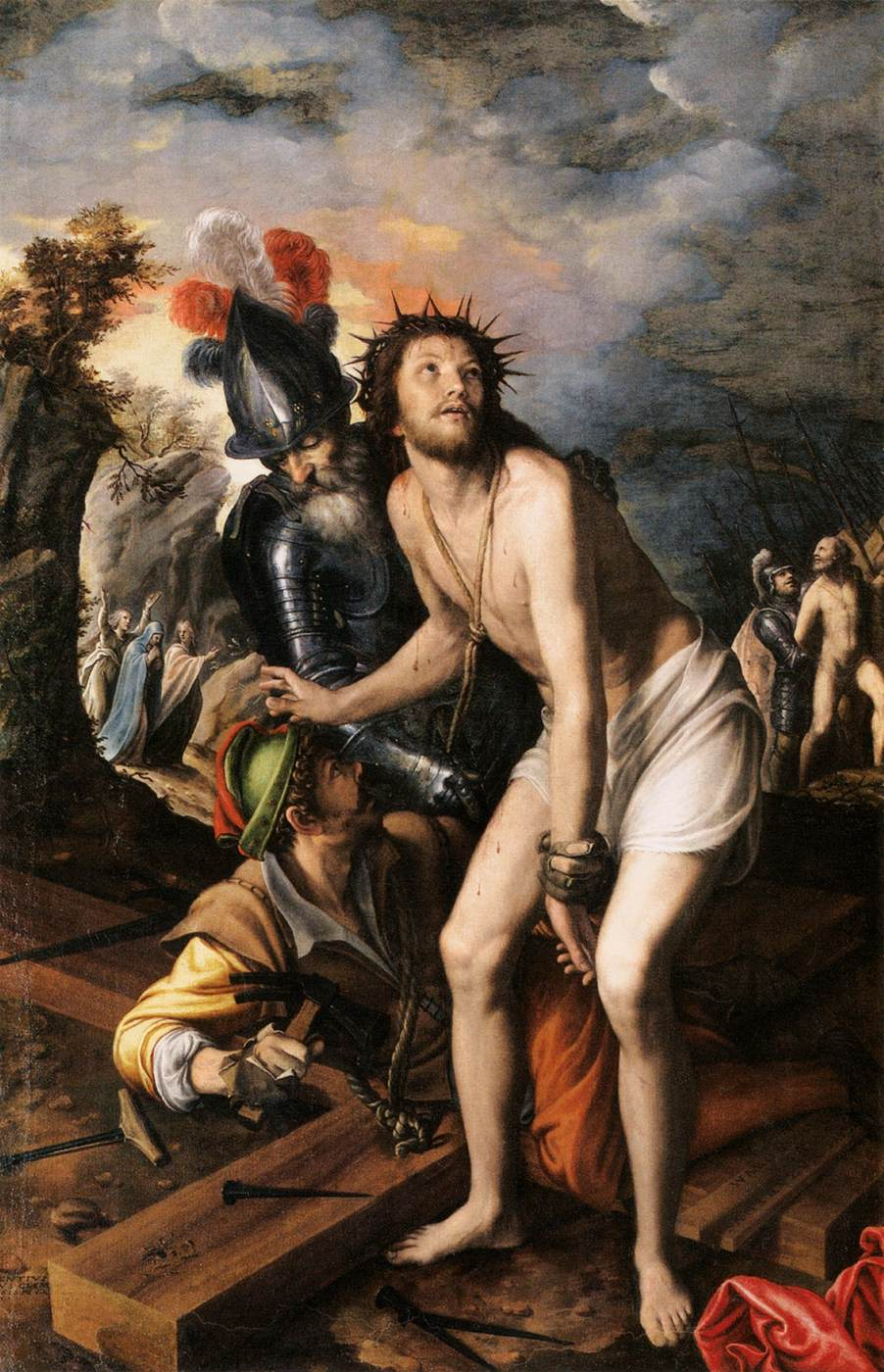
Vincenzo Campi, Christ Nailed to the Cross, 1575, oil on canvas, 196,5 x 136,5 cm, Museo della Certosa di Pavia

== Style ==
=== Cremonese Mannerism and Lombard naturalism ===
While his brothers Giulio and Antonio worked closely within the Cremonese Mannerist style, Vincenzo was celebrated for his naturalism and 'descriptive mode of painting' as described by Filippo Baldinucci in his Notizie as, '(a) good naturalist, keeping always to the imitation of the real.' Vincenzo's development in style is thought to have been motivated by both the death of his brother Giulio in 1573, and the influence of an important commission received in that same year. Vincenzo was commissioned to fresco the spandrels of the Cremona Cathedral left unfinished by the painter Il Pordenone some fifty years previously. It is suggested that it was through the loss of the stylistic guidance of his brother, and the influence of Pordenone's raw and expressive frescos, that Vincenzo began to merge the styles of Cremonese Mannerism and Lombard naturalism in his painting.

=== Religious painting ===
Although it is not what he is best known for, Vincenzo and his brothers were most active as painters of religious subjects. Pordenone's influence can be clearly seen in Vincenzo's 1575 altarpiece, Christ Nailed to the Cross (Museo della Certosa di Pavia) that shows the artist's developing Lombard naturalism. The crucifixion is unconventionally depicted with Christ standing awkwardly over the cross while his arm is pulled to the ground by the hand of the executioner poised between his legs. The peculiar pose was appropriated from an early drawing by Il Pordenone depicting the Passion of Christ. The same setting is taken up two years later (1577) in an altarpiece with the same theme now preserved in the Museo del Prado in Madrid.

=== Northern Italian genre painting ===
Campi is best known for his significant contribution to the birth of northern Italian genre painting. The style appeared quite suddenly between 1580 and 1585 in Cremona and Bologna, and its development was heavily influenced by similar genre paintings by Flemish artists Pieter Aertsen and Joachim Beuckelaer. Access to these works was made possible by the import of Flemish genre paintings, in particular those of Beuckelaer, from Antwerp to Cremona by wealthy merchants including the Affaitati banking family who had holdings in both cities. It is highly likely that Campi had access to these imported paintings through his time painting for the House of Farnese in Piacenza where the family held significant collections of these imported Flemish genre scenes. Campi was a key figure in the birth of genre painting in northern Italy as he was the first to paint a series of paintings depicting butchers, fish vendors and poultry sellers as a commission for the wealthy Fugger family of Augsburg.

This development saw a move away from Mannerism towards an "Anti-Mannerist" naturalism described by Art Historian Walter Friedlaender, as, 'A healthy down-to-earth spirit (coming) into existence, paralleling a vigorous treatment of form achieved through purposeful work and renewed contact with living reality.'

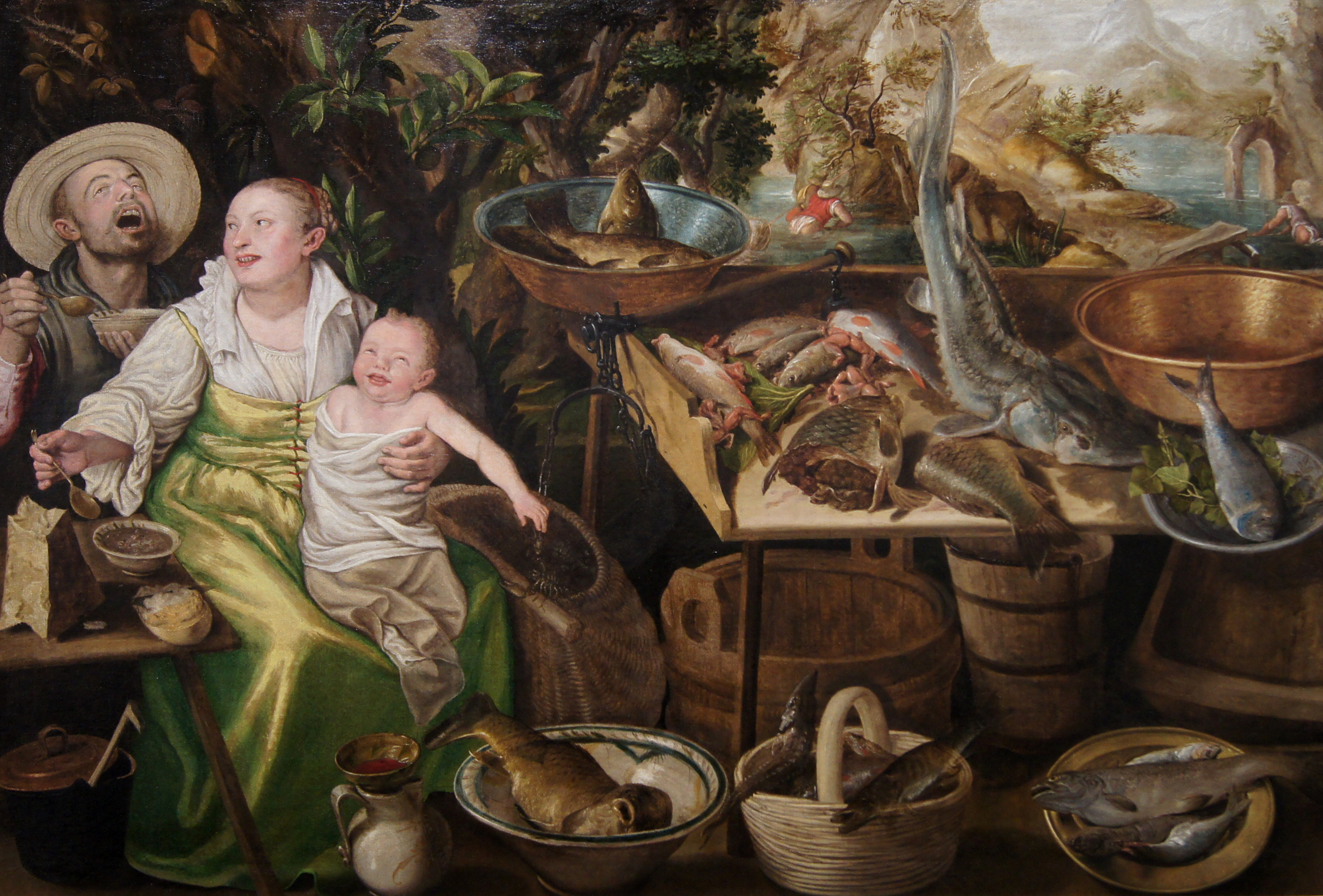
Vincenzo Campi, Pescivendoli (The fishmongers), 1579, oil on canvas, 146 x 214 cm. La Roche-sur-Yon museum.

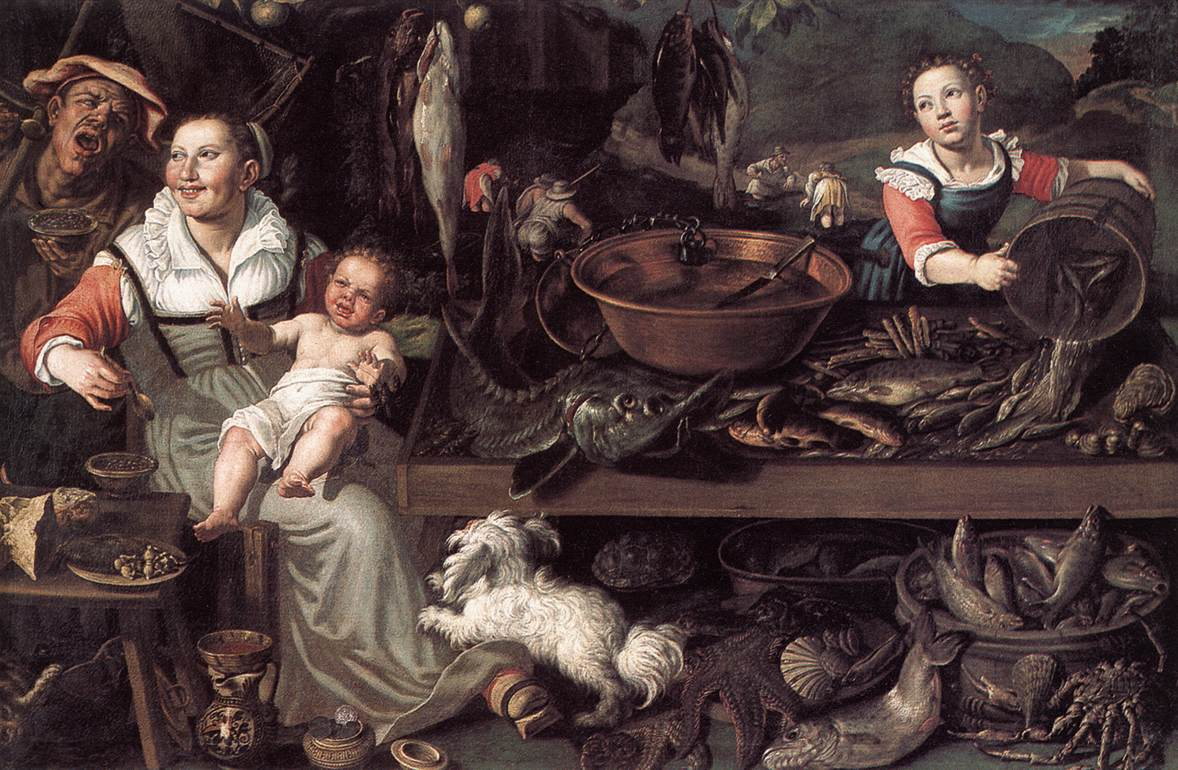
Vincenzo Campi, Fishmongers, c. 1580, oil on canvas, 145 x 215 cm, Pinacoteca di Brera, Milan

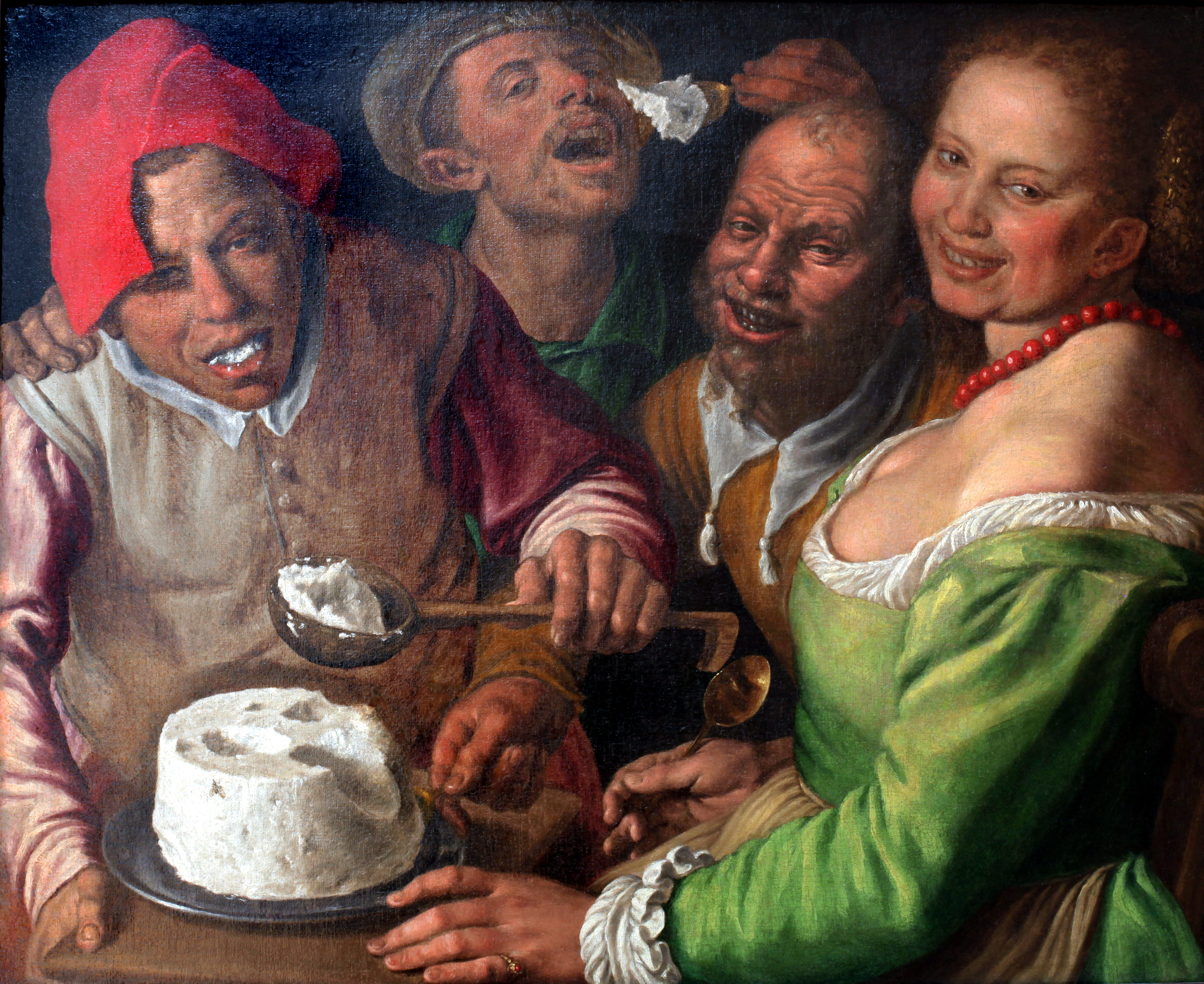
Vincenzo Campi, The Ricotta Eaters, 1580, oil on canvas, Museum of Fine Arts of Lyon

Campi's depictions of the villano, or peasant illustrated and reinforced a contemporary northern Italian discourse that argued certain foods were only appropriate for high-born citizens and others for low-born. Campi's Fishmongers depicts its subjects eating beans, dark bread, and scallions, which were the exact foods listed as only suitable for the working classes in Bartolomeo Pisanelli's influential Trattato della natura de’ cibi et del bere published in 1585. Cheese was also seen to be suitable nourishment for the lower classes, '(who) do not have the means to provide themselves with other more healthy foods'. Campi illustrates the low standing of cheese in his work, The Ricotta Eaters, which rather unflatteringly depicts "gluttonous peasants" laughing and spooning fresh cheese into their gaping mouths.

Despite Campi's choice to depict the lower working classes, his treatment of these subjects was neither sympathetic nor romanticised. With the heavy use of food metaphors and established character tropes, Campi often depicts his subjects as crude, dim-witted, and sexually available. Art Historian Barry Wind sees these works as a contemporary extension of the classical idea of pitture ridicole, or comic painting, where the painting served as a '"sustained bawdy joke" for an educated man with a low sense of humour.'

== Influence ==
Other artists working alongside Campi in Cremona between 1580 and 1585 include Bartolomeo Passarotti and his apprentice, Annibale Carracci who both made significant contributions to the development of northern Italian genre painting. Art historians often describe these 1580s works as a precursor to Caravaggio’s more progressive realism emerging in the following decade.

== Selected works ==
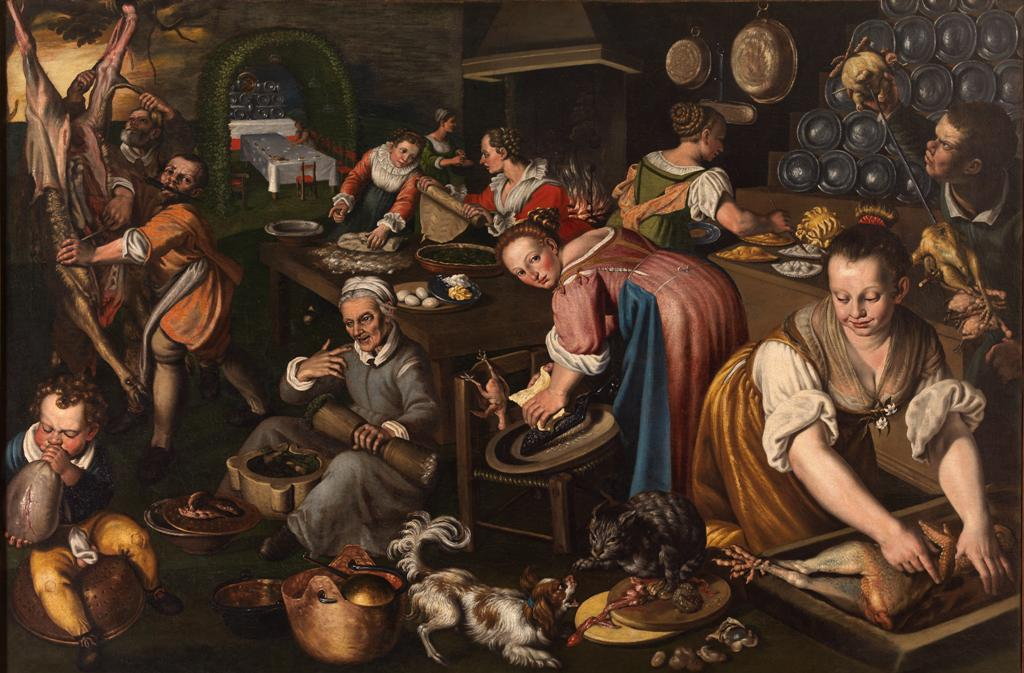
Vincenco Campi, Kitchen, 1580, oil on canvas, Pinacoteca di Brera, Milan

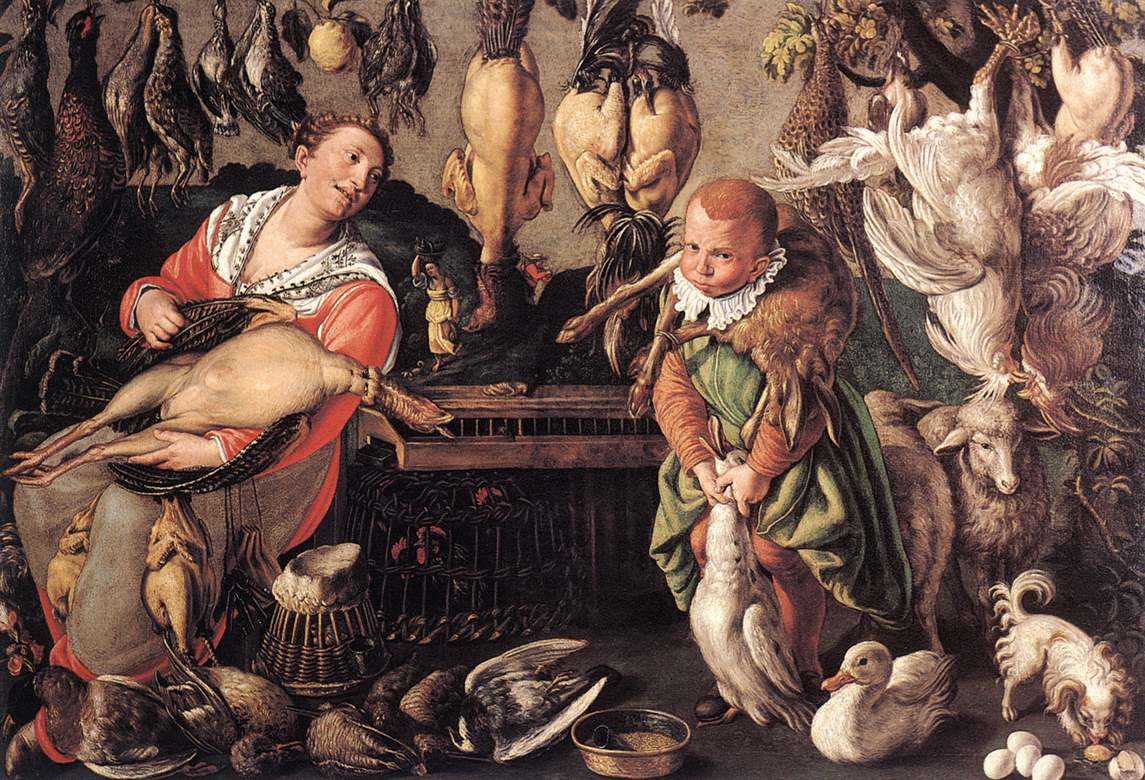
Vincenzo Campi, Chicken Vendors, 1580, oil on canvas, Pinacoteca di Brera

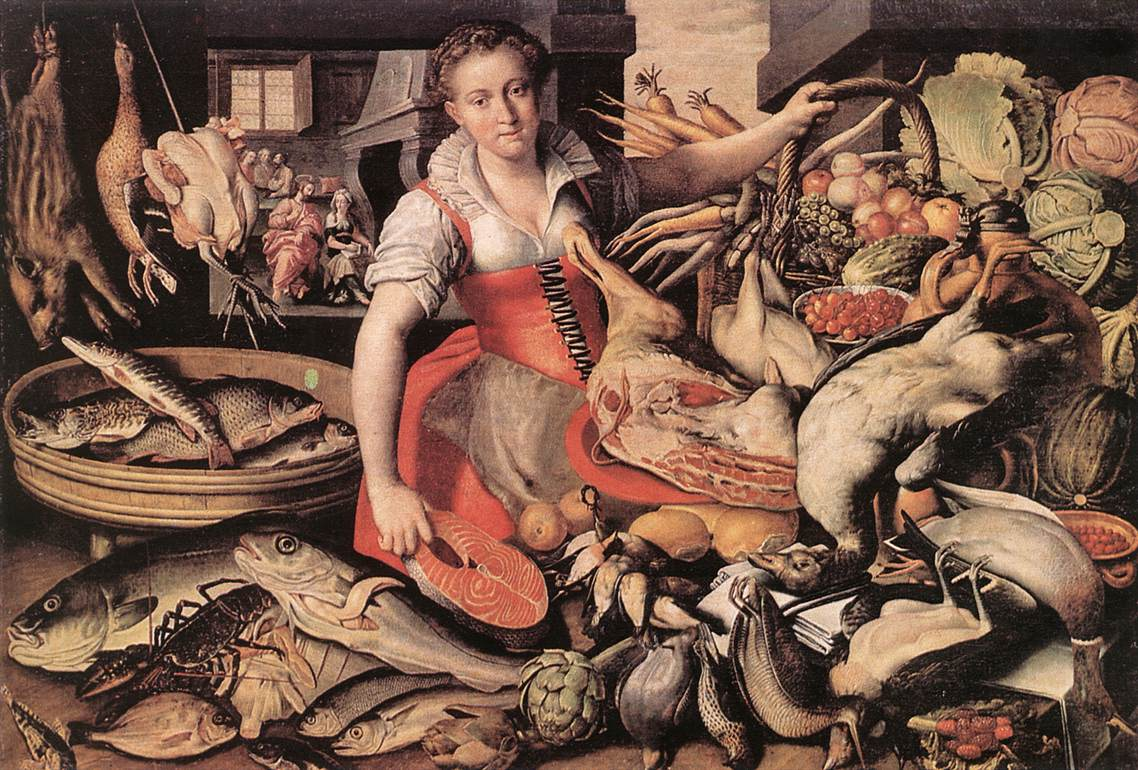
Vincenzo Campi, Christ in the House of Mary and Martha, c.1580, oil on canvas, Galleria Estense

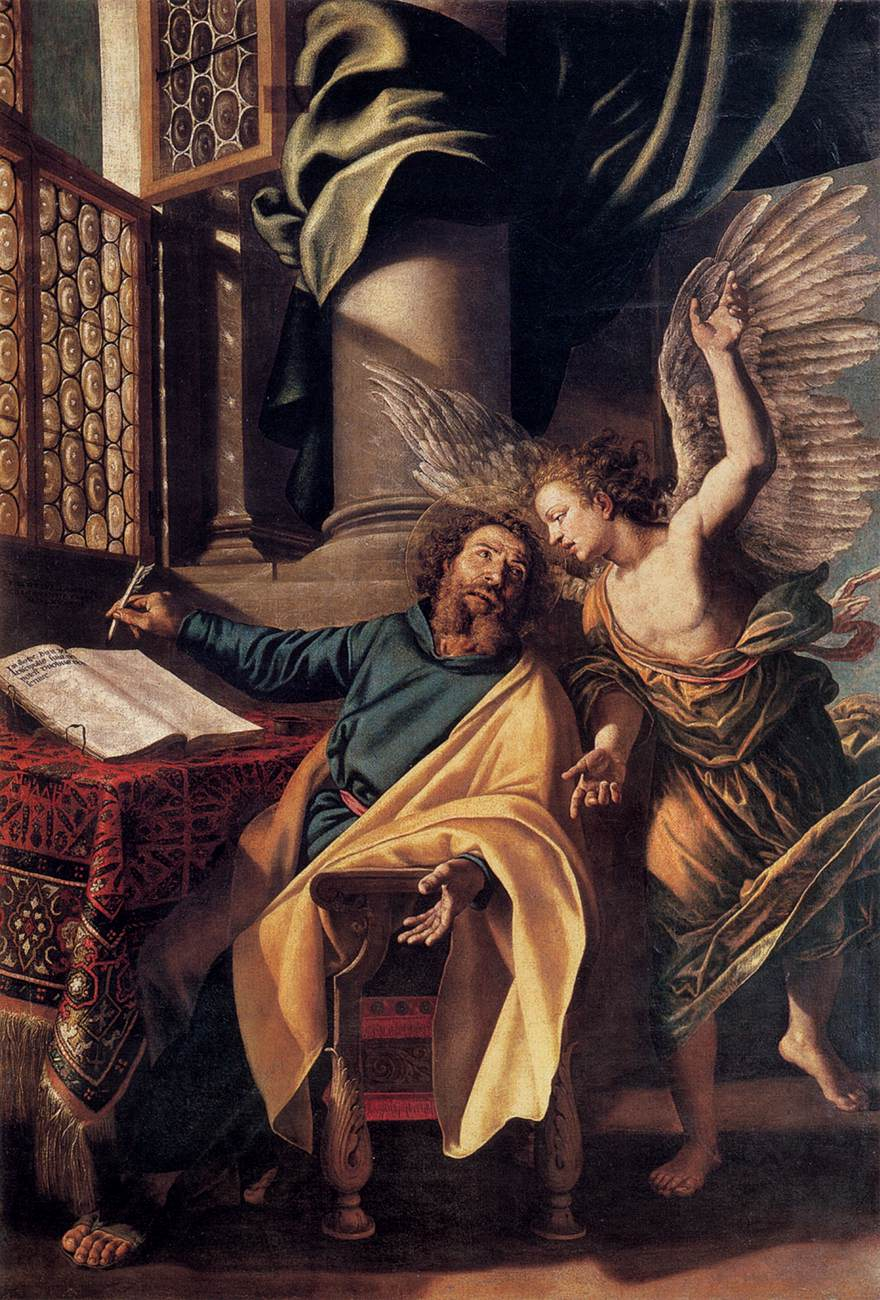
Vincenzo Campi, St Matthew and the Angel, 1588, oil on canvas, 268 x 180 cm, Pavia, San Francesco d'Assisi

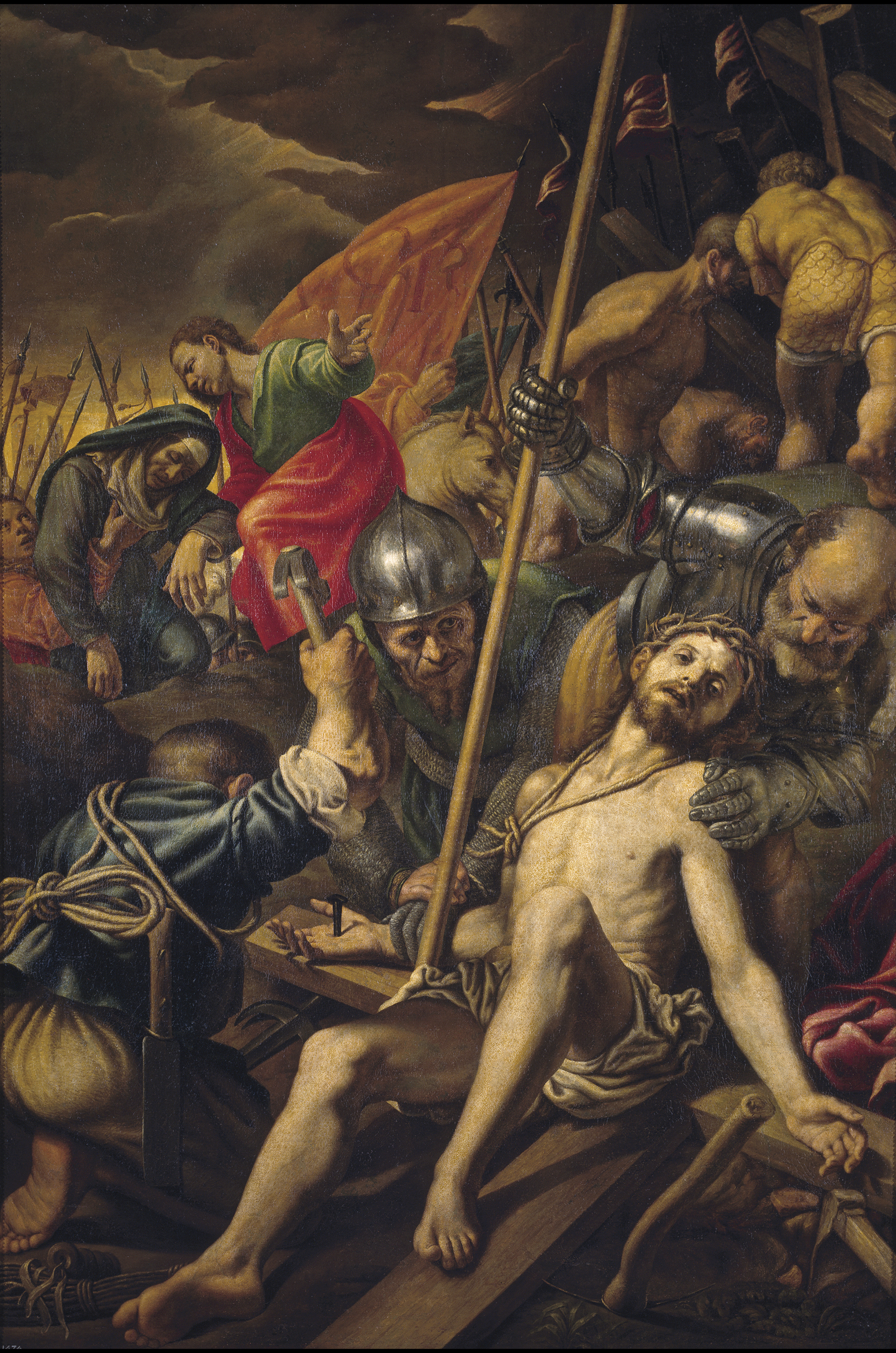
Vincenzo Campi, The Crucifixion, c. 1577, oil on canvas, 201 x 141 cm, Museo del Prado, Madrid

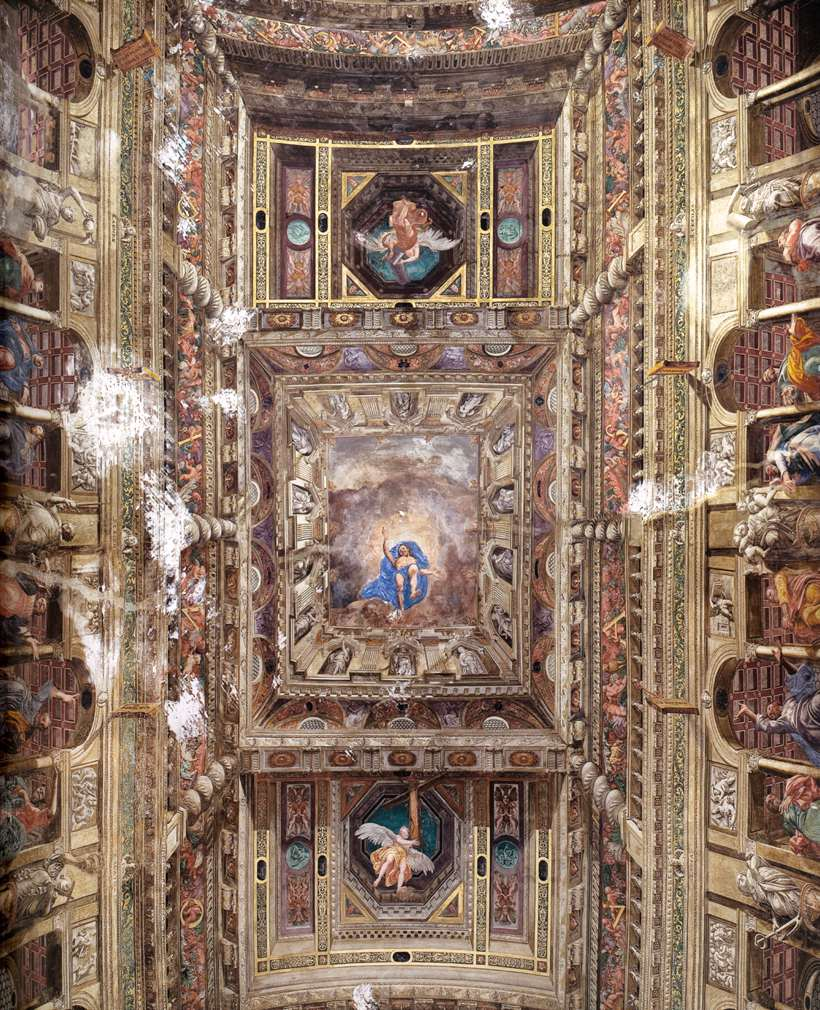
Vincenzo Campi, Ascension of Christ, 1588, fresco, San Paolo Converso, Milan

== Sources ==
- Baldinucci, Filippo. 1815. Notizie Del Professore Del Disegno De Cinnabar. 2nd ed. Florence: Francesco Saverio Baldinucci and Ferdinancln Ranalli.
- Friedlaender, Walter F and Donald Posner. 1965. Mannerism And Anti-Mannerism In Italian Painting. New York: Schocken Books.
- McTighe, Sheila. 2004. "Foods And The Body In Italian Genre Paintings, About 1580: Campi, Passarotti, Carracci". The Art Bulletin 86 (2): 301–323.
- Moynihan, Kim-Ly Thi. 2012. "Comedy, Science, And The Reform Of Description In Lombard Painting Of The Late Renaissance: Arcimboldo, Vincenzo Campi, And Bartolomeo Passerotti". Ph.D., Columbia University.
- Pisanelli, Baldassare. 1586. Trattato Della Natura De' Cibi Et Del Bere. Venetia: Gio. Alberti.
- The Age Of Caravaggio. 1985. New York: Metropolitan Museum of Art.
- Wind, Barry. 1974. “Pitture Ridicole: Some Late Cinquecento Comic Genre Painting.” Storia Dell’arte 20: 24–35.
