= The Ricotta Eaters =

Painting by Vincenzo Campi

- I Mangiatori di Ricotta (Italian), Les Mangeurs de Ricotta (French)
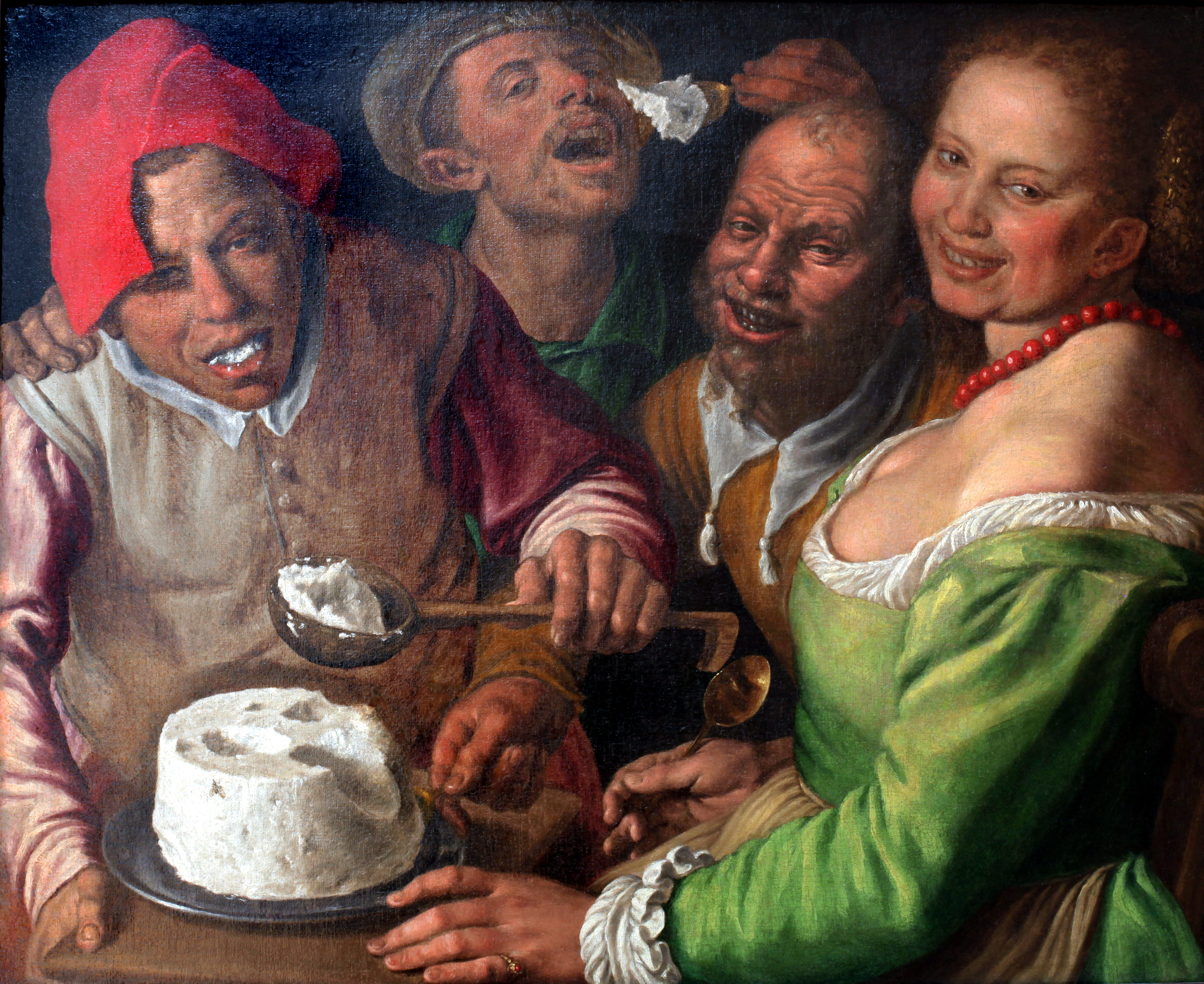
- Artist: Vincenzo Campi
- Year: c. 1585
- Medium: Oil on canvas
- Subject: Genre painting
- Dimensions: 72 cm × 89.5 cm (28 in × 35.2 in)
- Location: Museum of Fine Arts of Lyon; Lyon

The Ricotta Eaters is a c.1585 oil on canvas painting by Vincenzo Campi, showing four figures eating a round ricotta. The artist himself entitled it Buffonaria, which links its four figures to Commedia dell'arte characters, and depicted himself as Pantalone, wearing red costume. In 1875, the work was presented by Jacques Bernard to the Museum of Fine Arts of Lyon, where it is currently displayed.

== Symbolism ==
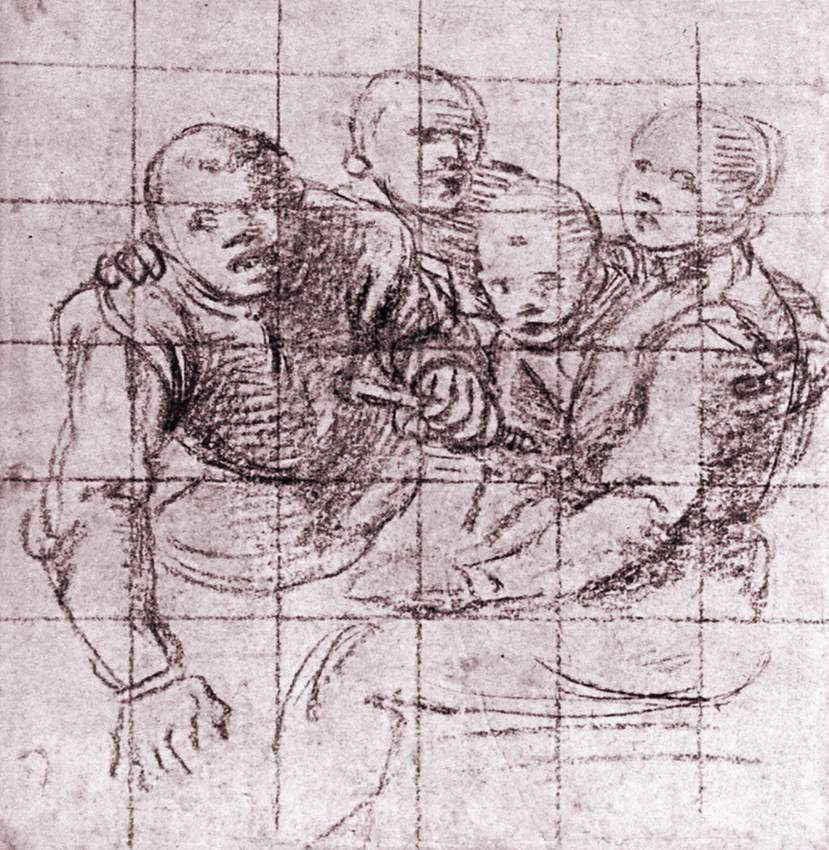
Black pencil on brown paper, 20.5 x 19.2 cm. Campi's pencil study for the painting; it is currently in Staatliche Kunstsammlungen Dresden's collection.

The ricotta placed on the tray appears to form an image of the skull, symbolizing memento mori, a reminder of death, in an atmosphere characterised by excess and abandon.
