= Joachim Beuckelaer =

Flemish painter and draftsman (c. 1533-c. 1570/4)

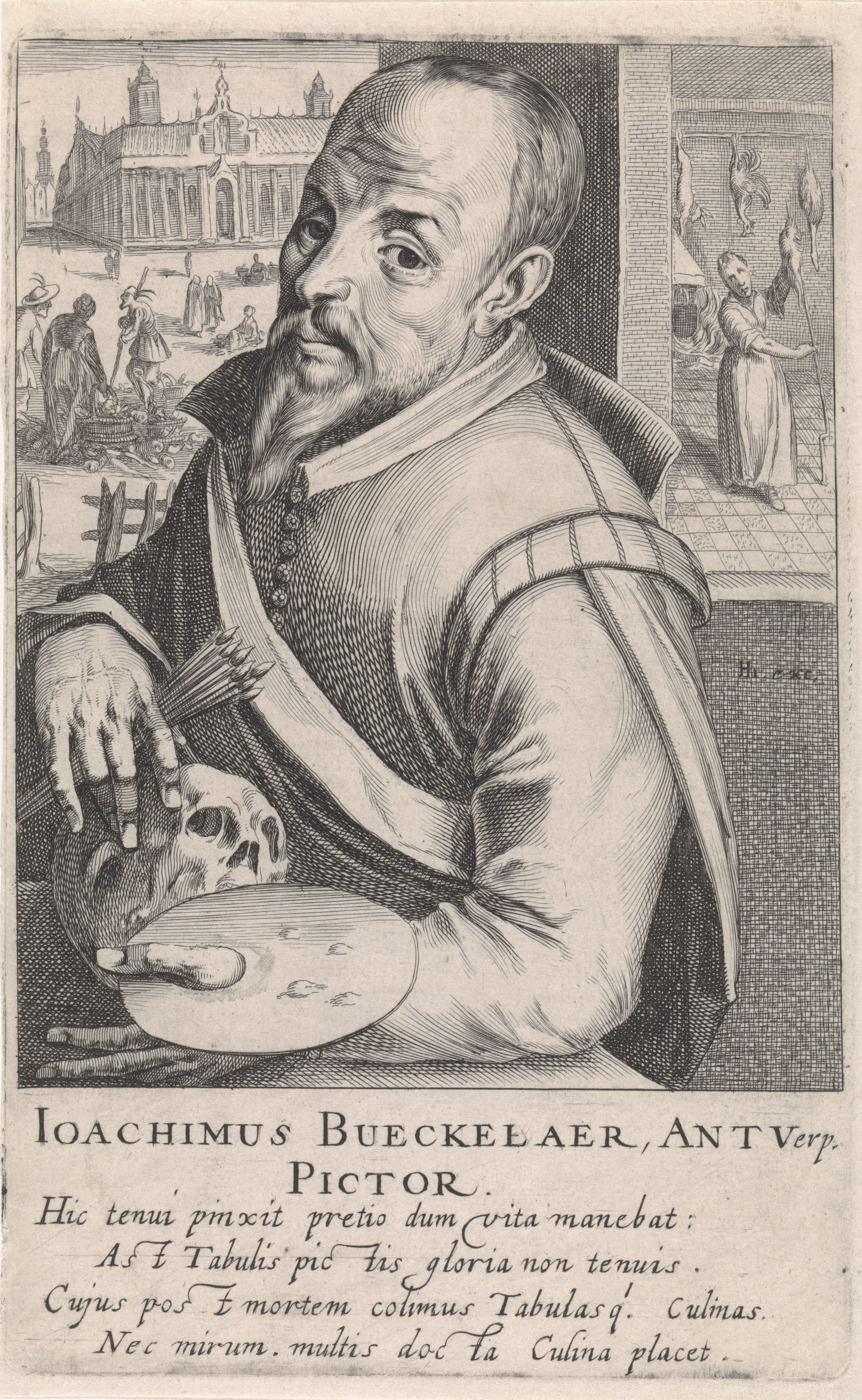
- Portrait of Joachim Beuckelaer
- Born: c. 1533; Antwerp
- Died: c. 1570/4 (aged 37-41)

Joachim Beuckelaer (c. 1533 – c. 1570/4) was a Flemish painter specialising in market and kitchen scenes with elaborate displays of food and household equipment. His development of the genre of market and kitchen scenes was influential on the development of still life art in Northern Europe as well as Italy and Spain. He also painted still lifes with no figures in the central scene. He further added the staffage (i.e. the figures) or the garments in works of other local painters, such as Anthonis Mor.

== Life ==
Details about the life of the artist are scarce. Beuckelaer was born in Antwerp into a family of painters. He was likely the son of the painter Mattheus Beuckeleer and the grandson of the painter Cornelis de Beuckelaer. His brother, known as Huybrecht Beuckeleer, also became a painter. The works of Huybrecht have occasionally been misattributed to Joachim. He possibly learned to paint in the workshop of his uncle, the Dutch painter Pieter Aertsen, who had married his aunt Kathelijne Beuckelaer. Aertsen was best known for his market and kitchen scenes.

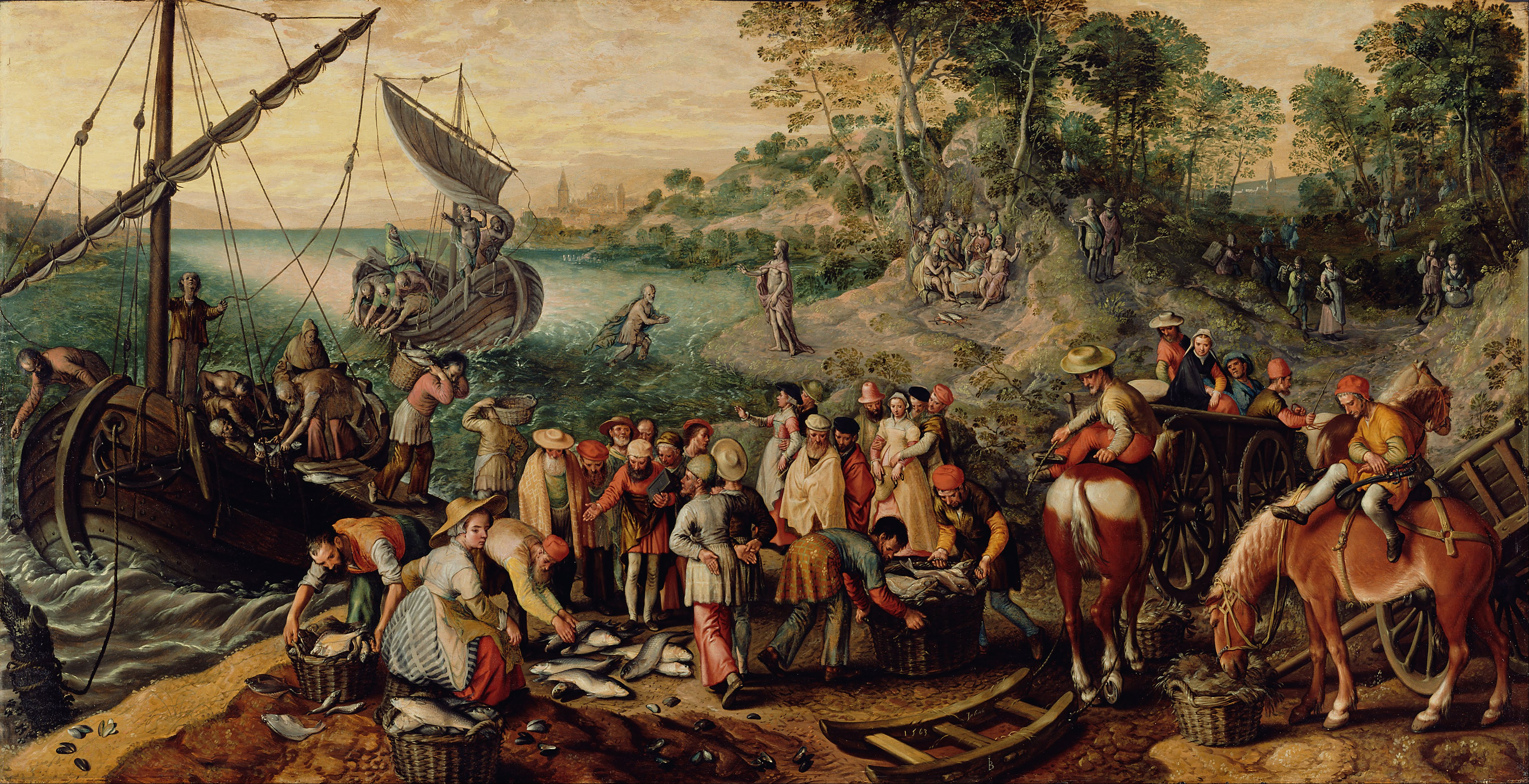
The Miraculous Draught of Fishes

Beuckelaer became an independent master in the Antwerp Guild of Saint Luke in 1560. He remained active in Antwerp throughout his career and continued to develop themes pioneered in painting by Aertsen, but arguably surpassing his presumed master in skill. Beuckelaer was reportedly not getting high prices for his works during his lifetime. It was only after his death that his works dramatically increased in price. However, the large size of his later works and the number of workshop variants produced likely point to a degree of success at least towards the end of his life.

The date of his death is not known with certainty but fell ill likely between 1570 and 1574.

Brothel scene

== Work ==
Beuckelaer specialised in market and kitchen scenes with elaborate displays of food and household equipment. He also painted some brothel scenes. During the 1560s, especially during the early part of the decade, Beuckelaer painted some purely religious works, possibly because there was little demand for his kitchen and market scenes. For these religious works, unlike for the kitchen and market scenes, drawings are known. Most of these were destroyed in the course of the Calvinist iconoclasm which swept the Low Countries, starting in Antwerp in 1566. His still life of a carcass referred to as Slaughtered pig (Wallraf-Richartz Museum) dated 1563 is likely the earliest dated example of this subject. In the 1560s he also made designs for stained glass.

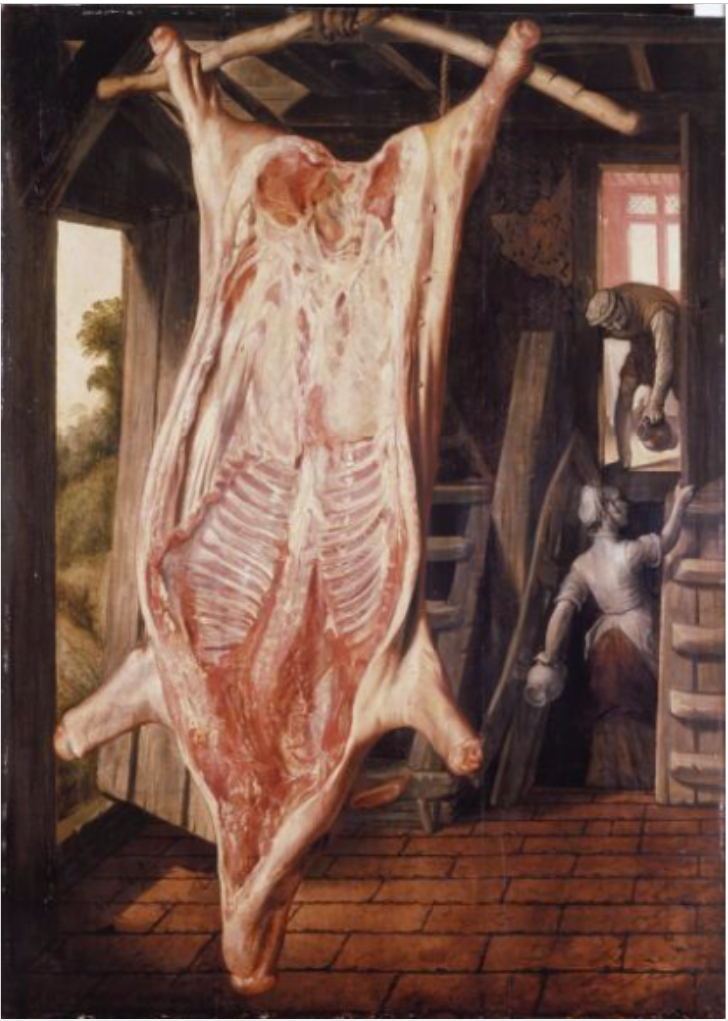
Slaughtered pig

Many of Beuckelaer's works, as those of Pieter Aertsen, show in the foreground tables full of bountiful produce which can be interpreted as temptations of earthly satisfactions. Often these works not only reference the pleasures of food but also contain objects and gestures which point to the temptations of sexual desire. For instance, visual representations of men's purses occasionally evoke men's genitals. These purses often had straps or false flaps and smaller pouches for coins on the bag's external side which could be very suggestive as is shown in the Market farmers in the Kunsthistorisches Museum. In the Poultry dealer and a young woman with an array of fruit, vegetables, fish and game on a table before a house, the poultry dealer is holding a large chicken and standing close behind the young woman. As in other cultures, the chicken or rooster was frequently a reference to male genitalia and sexuality, while the Dutch word 'vogel' (bird) was slang for sexual intercourse (as in the verb 'vogelen').

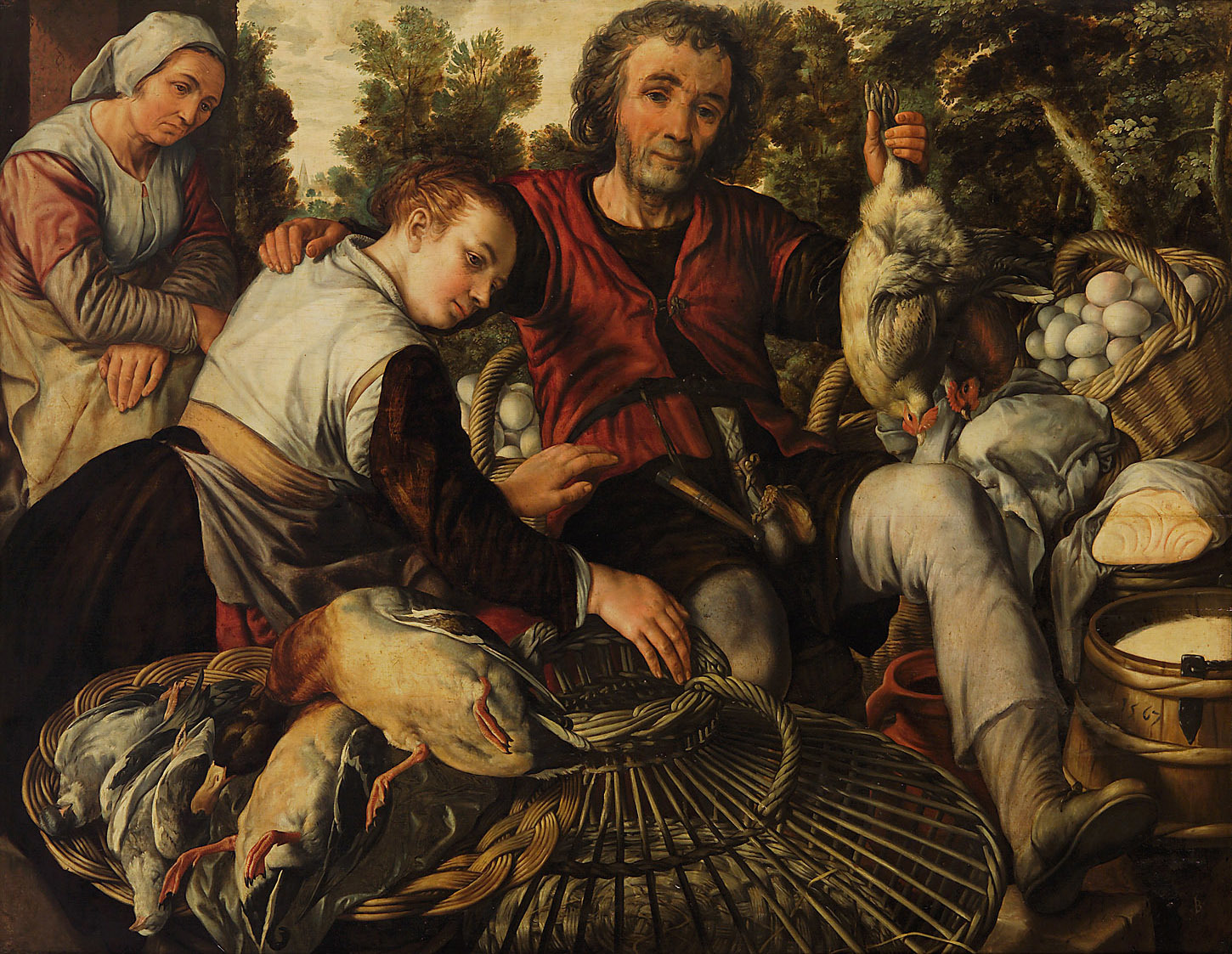
Market farmers

As an antidote to these earthly temptations, Beuckelaer's market scenes, like those of Aertsen, often incorporate biblical episodes in the background. His Four Elements series National Gallery, London are a good example. The painting depicting the element Water, for example, shows a fish market selling 12 kinds of fish, representing the twelve disciples of Jesus. Through an archway in the background the miraculous draught of fishes is depicted, with Christ appearing to his apostles and telling them to cast their nets on the other side of the boat. The scene appearing most frequently in the background is that of Christ in the House of Mary and Martha. It recounts the story of Christ visiting the sisters at their home in Bethany, and reprimanding Martha for busying herself with household matters rather than heeding his message. The moral message of these religious scenes was to encourage viewers to leave behind the temptations of the flesh and move towards the spiritual food offered by the Christian faith.

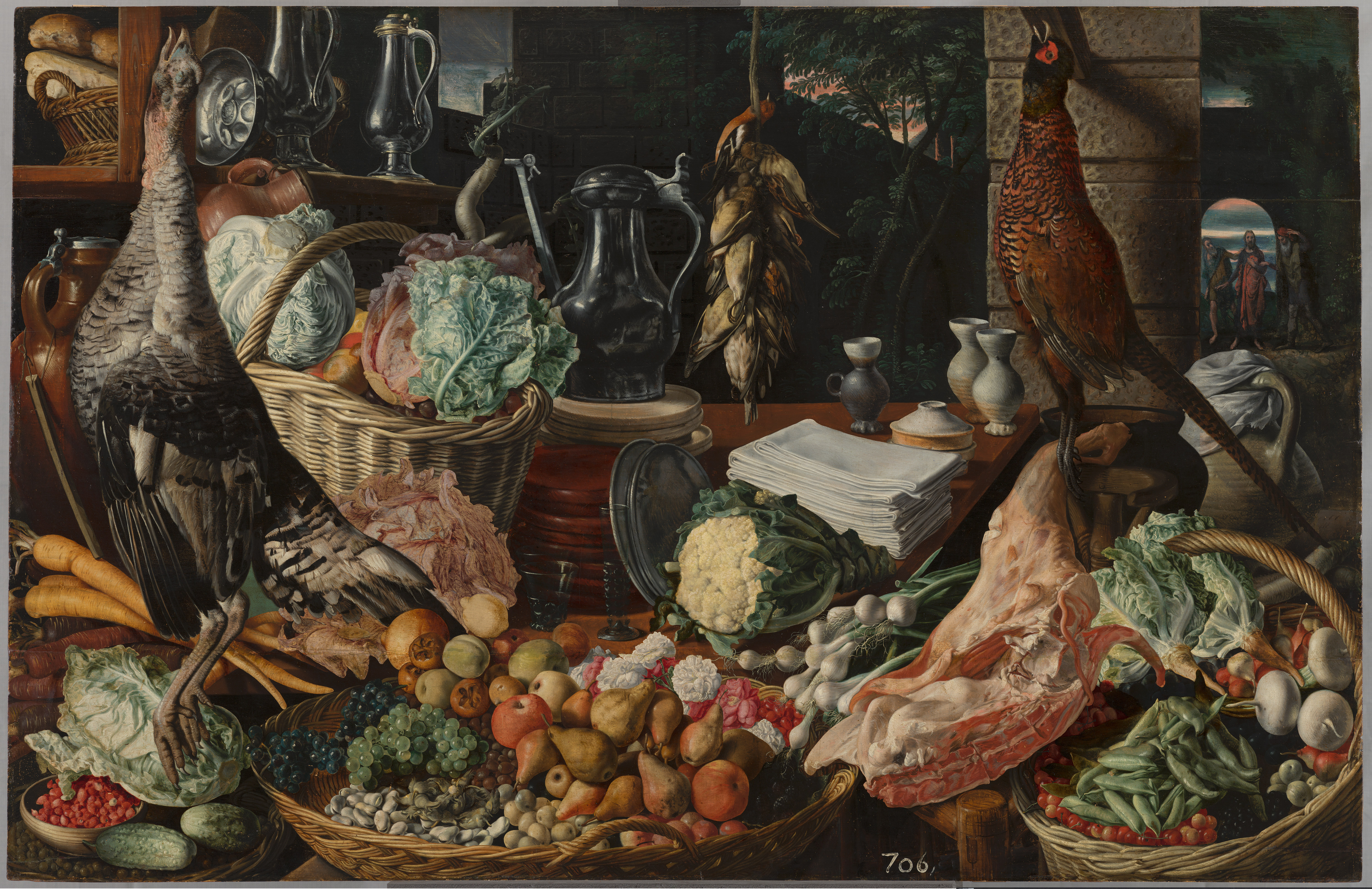
Kitchen scene with Christ at Emmaus

Both Aertsen and Beuckelaer gradually developed images that detached the world of produce from the religious content of their earlier hybrid images. These later works depict either kitchens or markets and the persons associated with those activities, more often women than men. The later paintings by Beuckelaer show a greater profusion of foodstuffs in the market scenes, together with a more prominent foregrounding of female peasants immersed within these sales items. Beuckelaer also produced several images of fish stalls, often with background religious scenes, but sometimes completely separated from any additional narrative or reference. In the year 1563 Beuckelaer was experimenting with more outspoken landscape settings in an innovative way, which was influential on later artists in Antwerp.

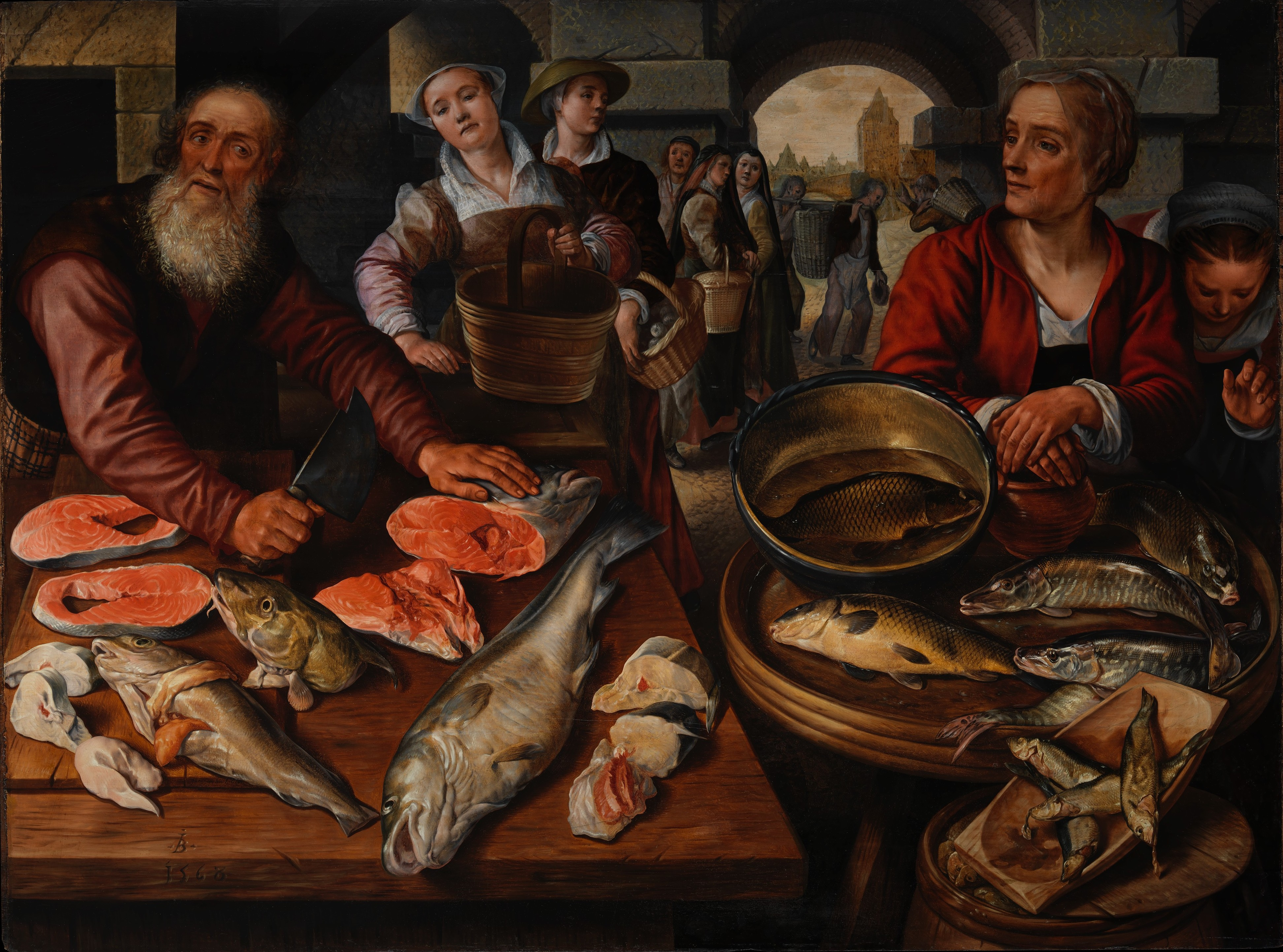
Fish Market

One of the still lives without figures in the kitchen or market scene itself is the Kitchen scene with Christ at Emmaus (c. 1660/65, Mauritshuis, The Hague) which is unique in his oeuvre. In this composition Beuckelaer painted a kitchen with numerous ingredients for a lavish meal: vegetables, fruits, nuts, poultry and a large cut of meat. The table linen and crockery are also in view. In the background, Beuckelaer depicted the biblical story of Christ at Emmaus. This story is pushed into the background while the secondary matter of the dinner preparations for Christ's visit at Emmaus has become the painting's main subject. This and similar scenes are regarded as the forerunners of the still lifes of the 17th century, in which the narrative elements vanished entirely.

Beuckelaer was also employed painting the figures or the garments in the work of other artists such as Anthonis Mor and Cornelis van Dalem.

Research into the technique underlying Beuckelaer's canvases has shown that he often recycled his own compositions from one image to the next. He employed patterns of clustered items through tracings to compose new pictures with apparent variety. This kind of technique allowed him to increase production efficiency and cut costs in time and effort.

His work was influential in Flanders and abroad. The Flemish still life and animal painter Frans Snyders developed his Baroque many market scenes by taking inspiration of the work of Aertsen and Beuckelaer. Northern Italian painters such as Vincenzo Campi and Jacopo Bassano were also influenced by his work. Diego Velázquez was influenced by his kitchen scenes with religious scenes in the creation of his bodegones such as the Kitchen Scene with Christ in the House of Martha and Mary (1618, National Gallery). It is very likely that Velázquez had seen engravings of works of Aertsen and Beuckelaer.
