= Tommaso de Aleni =

Italian painter

Tommaso de Aleni (early 16th century) (also called Il Fadino), was an Italian painter of the Renaissance period, active in his native Cremona. He was a pupil of Galeazzo Campi. He was also influenced by the works of Perugino. He painted for the church of San Domenico at Cremona, where he was employed with Campi. A Nativity (1515) formerly in the church of San Domenico, was moved to the town-hall of Cremona.
