= Santa Rita, Cremona =

Church building in Cremona, Italy

Santa Rita is an ancient Roman Catholic church in Cremona, Italy. While it had been initially dedicated to the saints Margherita and Pelagia; since being reconsecrated in 1929 on May 22, the day devoted to St Rita of Cascia, the church has been affiliated with the latter saint.

In 1547, the church was rebuilt using designs of Giulio Campi, who also completed fresco decoration on walls and ceiling. The frescoes depict stories of the gospels and old testament. The frescoes on the walls were transferred to canvas in 1920. The wall niches hold twelve dark terracotta statues depicting the apostles, by Antonio Campi, brother of Giulio. An adjacent building, since 1989, serves as the Bishopric's seminary.

In the 18th century, restorations and decoration of the interior were completed by Giovanni Angelo Boroni and Giovanni Battista Zaist.
