= Galeazzo Campi =

Italian painter

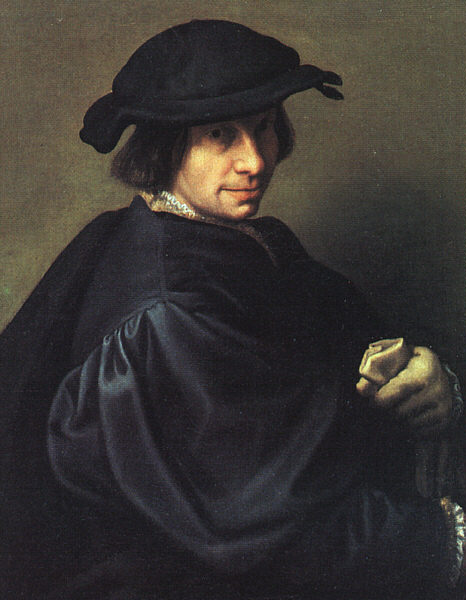
Galeazzo Campi, painted by his son Giulio

Galeazzo Campi (1475/1477 – 1536) was an Italian painter of the Renaissance from Cremona in Lombardy. He was a pupil of Boccaccio Boccaccini. His representation was rather rigid, but careful. His landscapes show influences of Perugino and Giovanni Bellini.

== Biography ==
Campi was the head of a family of artists, active in the mid and late 16th century in Cremona. Galeazzo is known to have contributed to painting in the church of Sant'Abbondio and for the Duomo of Cremona along with his brother Sebastiano. The family of artists also included his three sons, Giulio, Antonio and Vincenzo, each who became a notable painter in their own.

The painters Tommaso Aleni (known also as il Fadino) was said to be a pupil. Among his contemporaries in Cremona were Antonio Cigognini, Francesco Casella, Galeazzo Pesenti (Il Sabbioneta), Lattanzio da Cremona, Nicolo da Cremona, Giovanni Battista Zupelli, and Giovanni Francesco Bembo. Among his pupils was Lorenzo Becci.

Campi's works include a self-portrait, which was given a place in the Uffizi gallery of Florence. Other notable paintings include "Raising of Lazarus" and "A Virgin and Child".
