= Camillo Boccaccino =

Italian painter

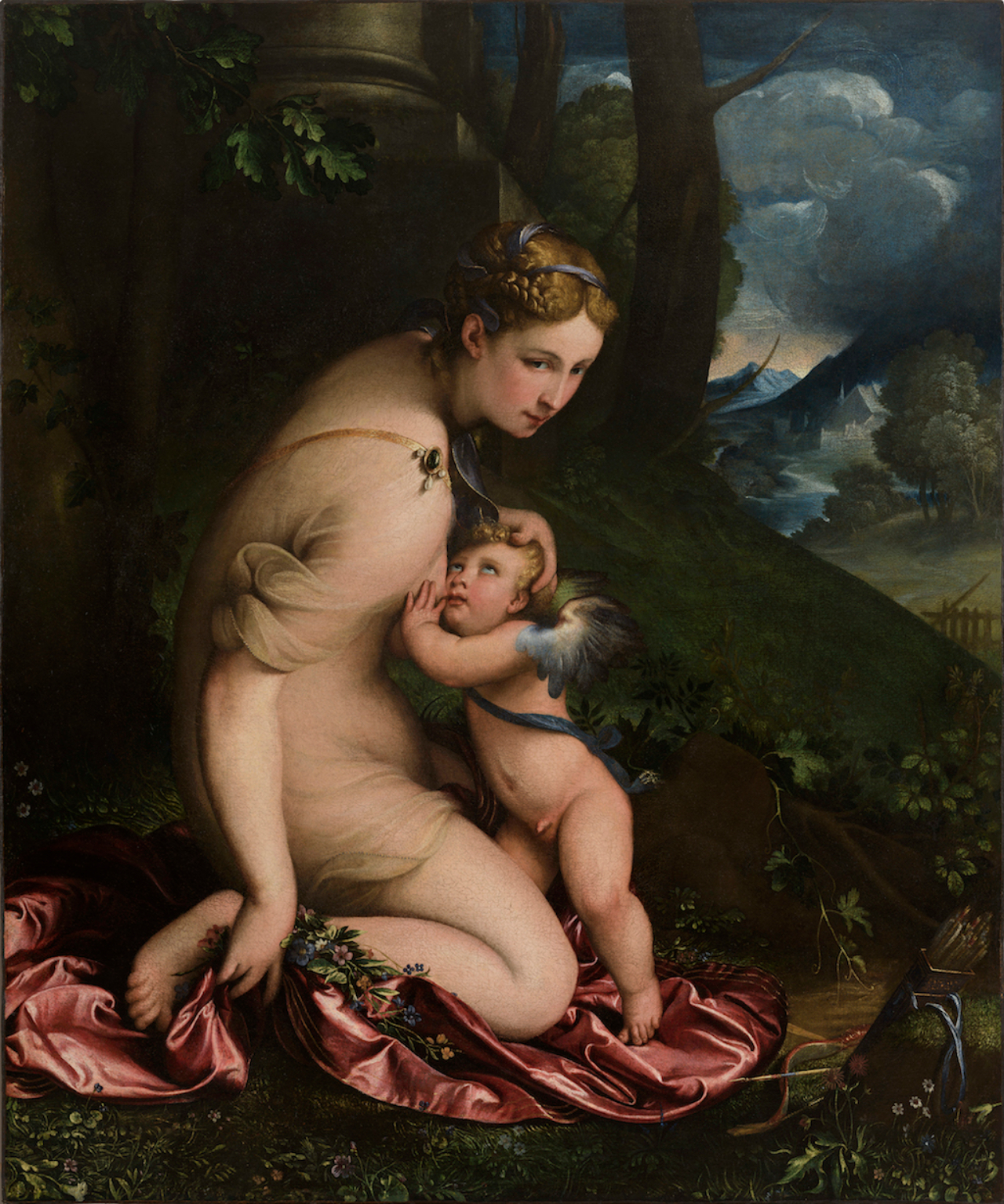
Venus Suckling Cupido, 1536

Camillo Boccaccino (Italian: [bokkatˈtʃiːno]; 1511 – 4 January 1546) was an Italian painter and draughtsman, active mainly in Cremona and the region of Lombardy who painted in a Mannerist style. Even though he died young and only left a very small body of work, he had an important influence on the development of painting in Northern Italy.

== Life ==
Little is known about the life of the artist. The writings of the 16th century art historians Gian Paolo Lomazzo and Giorgio Vasari are the principal sources of information. He was born in Cremona, the son of the painter Boccaccio Boccaccino and Adriana di Farfengo. He trained with his father who had introduced the style of Giorgione and Raphael in Cremona.

== Work ==
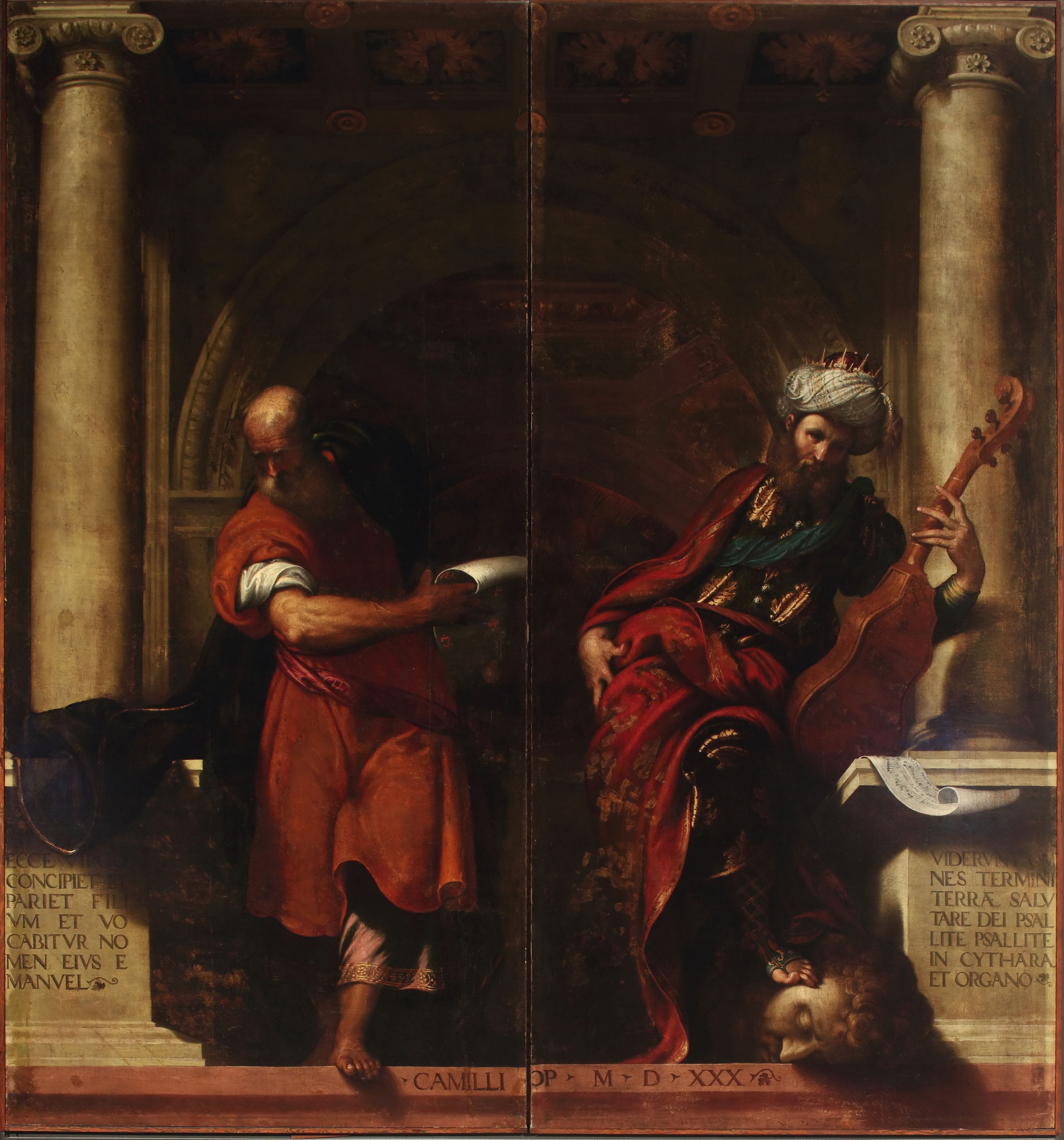
The prophet Isaiah and king David, 1530

Boccaccino left a small body of work. It includes three altarpieces for churches in his hometown Cremona (now respectively in the National Gallery in Prague, the Pinacoteca di Brera and the Museo Civico Ala Ponzone in Cremona), the frescoes in the apse and presbytery of the San Sigismondo Church in Cremona, the wings of the organ depicting The prophet Isaiah and king David in the Church of Santa Maria di Campagna in Piacenza and a handful of sacred and profane works such as the Venus Suckling Cupido (Pinacoteca di Brera).

He also left a number of drawings.

He developed his own style reflecting his knowledge of the work of Parmigianino, Correggio and Pordenone. He thus became the founder of the Mannerist style in painting in the Po valley.
