= Boccaccio Boccaccino =

Italian painter

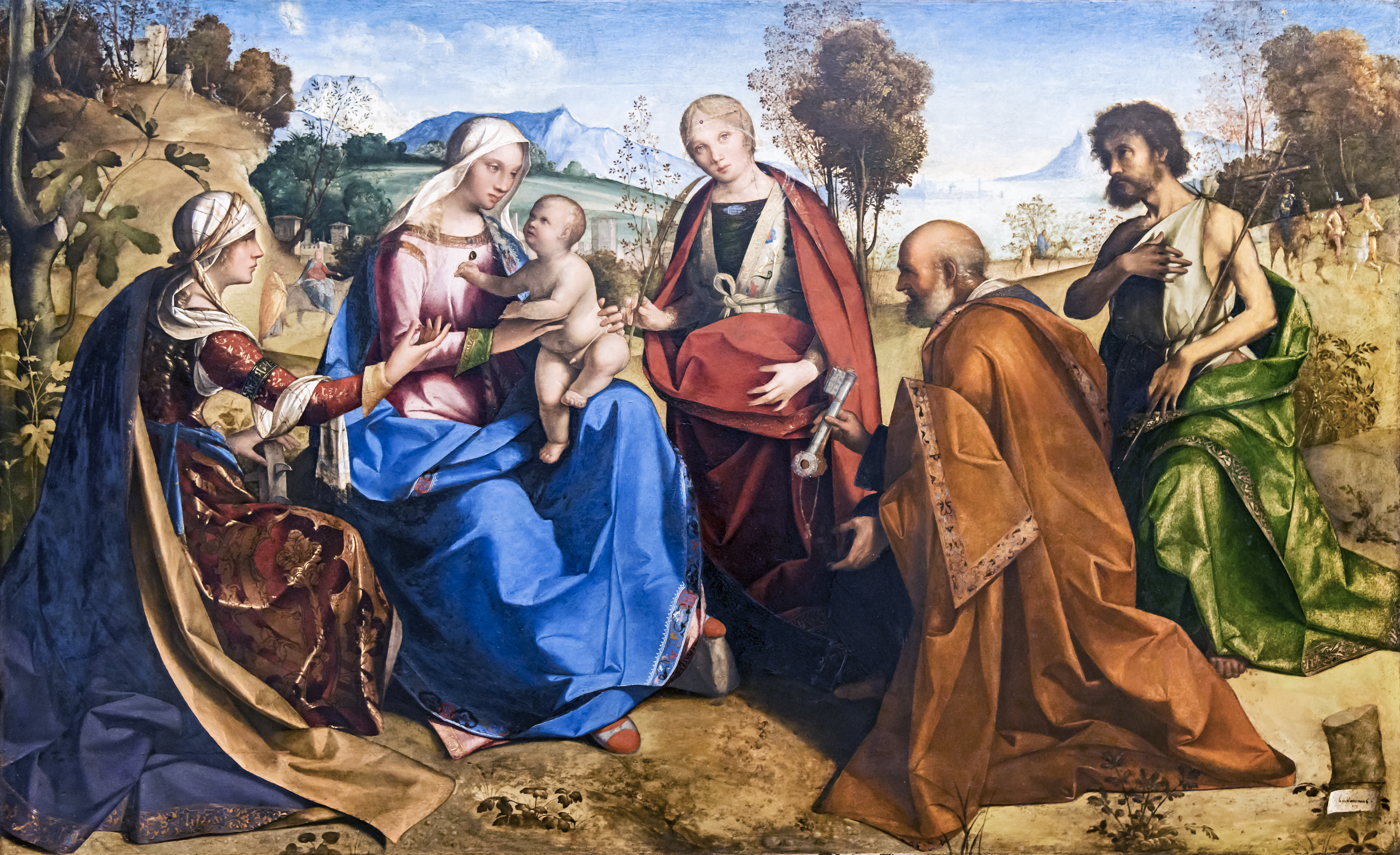
Mystical Marriage of Saint Catherine, Venice, 1504-5

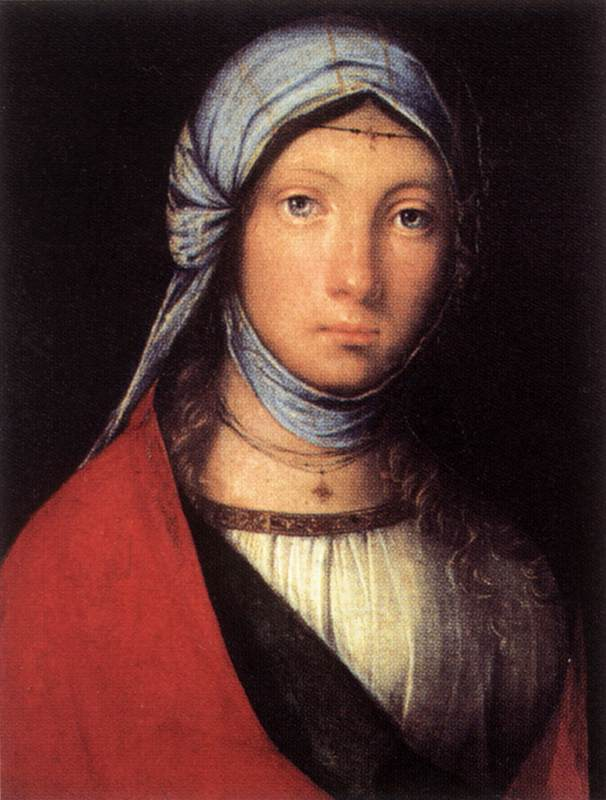
Gypsy Girl by Boccaccio Boccaccino, Uffizi, 1504-5

Boccaccio Boccaccino (c. 1467 – c. 1525) was a painter of the early Italian Renaissance, belonging to the Emilian school. He is profiled in Vasari's Le Vite delle più eccellenti pittori, scultori, ed architettori (or, in English, Lives of the Most Excellent Painters, Sculptors, and Architects).

He was born in Ferrara and studied there, probably under Domenico Panetti. Few facts of his life are known. His principal artistic activity was in Venice, Ferrara, and especially in Cremona, where he founded a school in which Garofalo was a pupil.

His most celebrated achievement is the frescoes in the Cathedral of Cremona (1506–1519) representing the Birth of the Virgin and some subjects from her life. His position there was taken over by Altobello Melone. His remaining works, which include the Marriage of Saint Catherine (Gallerie dell'Accademia, Venice), the Virgin and Child with Four Saints (Venice, San Giuliano), the Virgin and Two Saints (Cremona, San Quirilo), and the Holy Family (Paris, Louvre), are considered by Lanzi remarkable for richness of drapery, variety of color, spirit and grace of attitude, and harmony of landscape. Several works formerly attributed to Pietro Perugino, Pinturicchio, and Garofalo are now ascribed to Boccaccino.

Boccaccino died in Cremona. His son and pupil Camillo Boccaccino (1501–46) was a painter active in Cremona.

Paintings by Boccaccino are in the Milwaukee Art Museum, Museum of Fine Arts (Budapest), the Uffizi and National Museum of Art of Romania (Bucharest).
