= Santa Maria presso San Celso =

Church and sanctuary in Milan, Italy

Coordinates: 45°27′17″N 9°11′16″E

Church of Santa Maria presso San Celso
- Chiesa di Santa Maria dei Miracoli presso San Celso (Italian)
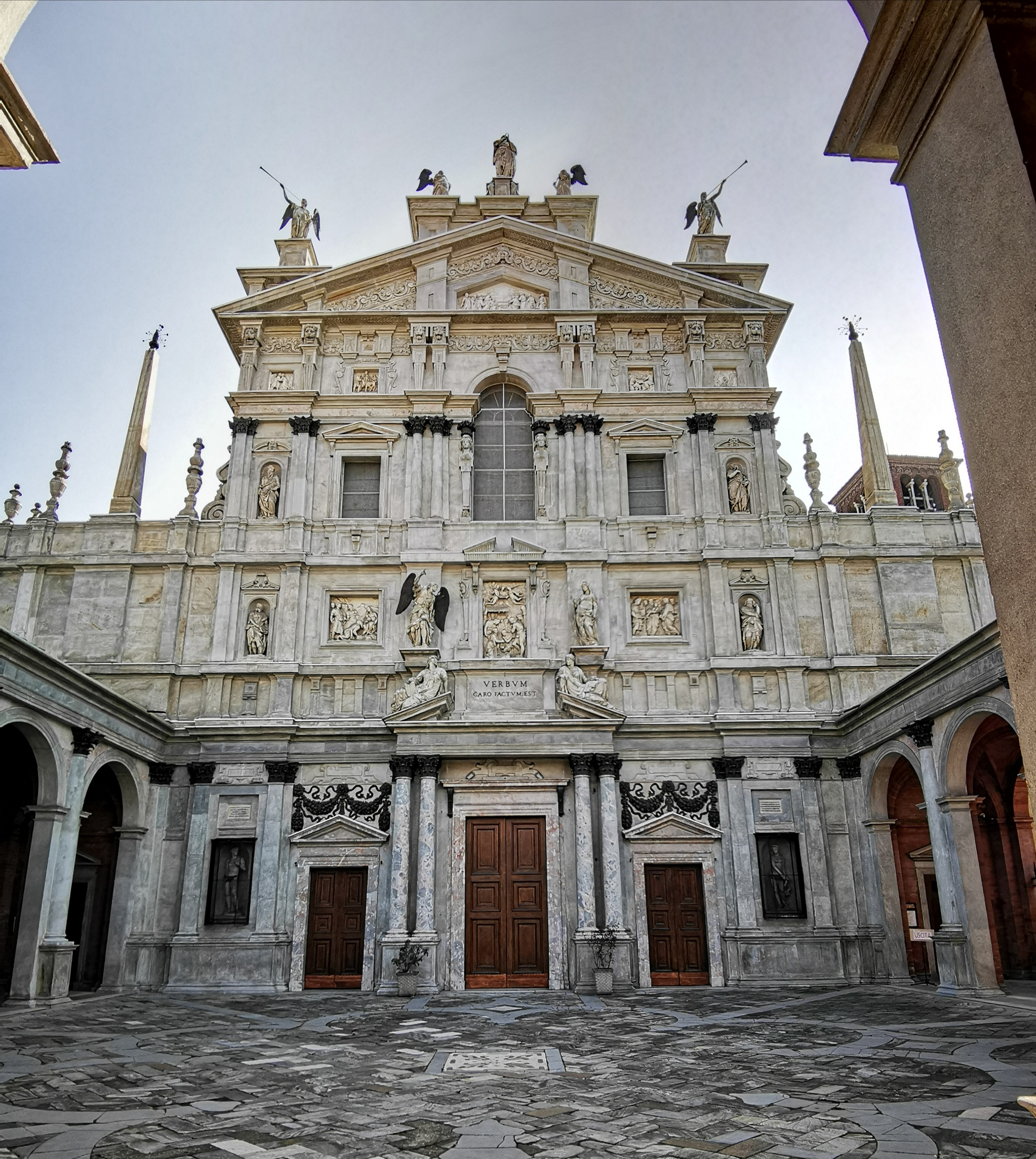

Religion
- Affiliation: Roman Catholic
- Province: Milan
- Status: Active

Location
- Location: Corso Italia #37, Milan, Italy
- Interactive map of Church of Santa Maria presso San Celso

Architecture
- Architects: Gian Giacomo Dolcebuono; Giovanni Battagio
- Type: Church
- Style: Renaissance; Baroque
- Groundbreaking: 1493
- Completed: 16c

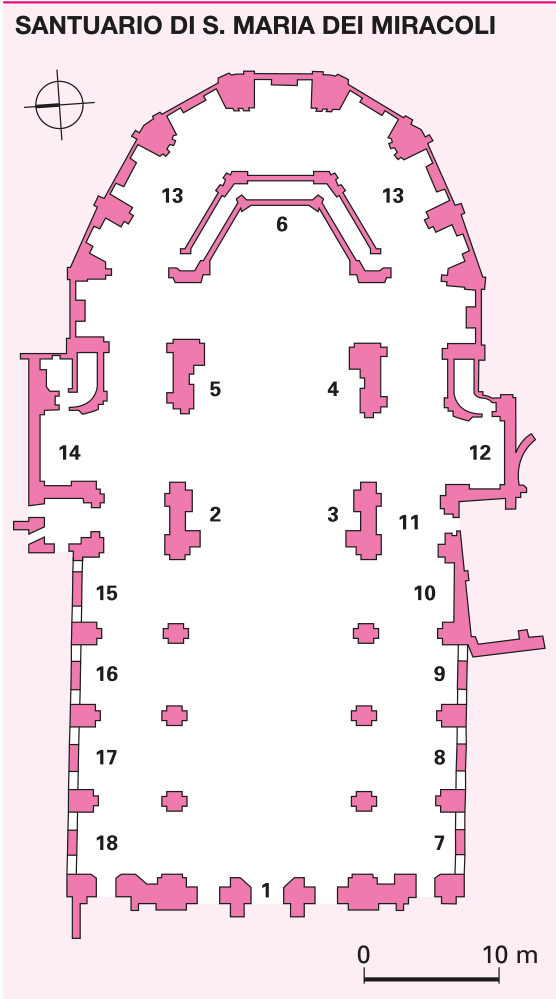
Map of the church

Santa Maria dei Miracoli presso San Celso (St Mary of the Miracles near San Celso) is a Roman Catholic church and a sanctuary in Milan, Lombardy, northern Italy.

== History of the church of San Celso ==
Annexed to Santa Maria is the Romanesque church of San Celso, dedicated to the martyr Saint Celsus, which was largely demolished. It was begun circa 396 AD after St Ambrose, bishop of Milan putatively found the tomb of this saint (and of St Nazarius) at this site.

The church of San Celso we see today was erected just before the year 1000 by the bishop of Milan Landulfo II. It was at this time attached to a Benedictine monastery. Initially the facades of Santa Maria and San Celso were in parallel. In the early 19th century, the nave was reduced in length to a third of its original size, and before it now is a small garden. In the 1830s, the monastery was also demolished.

The façade, refurbished in the 19th century, has a gothic rose window and a Romanesque portal with animal figures decoration. Also from the 11th century is the bell tower.

== History and overview of the church of Santa Maria ==
In the year 1430, a small chapel was built to shelter a fading fresco of the Virgin and Child painted on a wall next to San Celso. In 1485, while a plague was afflicting the city, during a crowded mass held on December 30, a curtain that was covering this fresco putatively was parted by an apparition of the Virgin and her child. This miracle was assumed to have led to the waning of the plague.

This miracle led to increased attendance of devotees seeking to see the miraculous icon of the Madonna and Child. This led to the commission of a larger church, first designed in 1493 by Gian Giacomo Dolcebuono and Giovanni Battagio in 1493, initially on the central plan. The first part to be built was the octagonal dome, covered externally by a tambour with a loggia and arcades decorated by twelve brickwork statues by Agostino De Fondulis, designed in Lombard style by Giovanni Antonio Amadeo (1494-1498). Soon this structure was deemed to small, and by 1506 it was enlarged with two aisles was added to the original edifice, the former covered by a monumental barrel vault also by Amadeo; the presbytery received a polygonal ambulatory inspired to that in the Duomo.

In the 16th century also the square portico in classical style was added, perhaps designed by Cesare Cesariano or Cristoforo Lombardo (il Lombardino). The massive eclectic and Mannerist style façade was designed by Galeazzo Alessi in the late 16th century and was realized by Martino Bassi; it is decorated by numerous statues and reliefs. The statues of Adam and Eve were sculpted by Stoldo Lorenzi and the sybyls by Annibale Fontana. Before the facade is a porticoed courtyard; the street front has a stone wall with two doors.

From 1595 the organist was the keyboard virtuoso Giovanni Paolo Cima.

== Interior ==
The interior houses numerous works by Milanese Renaissance and Baroque artists, such as Giovan Battista Crespi (il Cerano), Carlo Francesco Nuvolone, Antonio Campi, Bergognone, Callisto Piazza and others. The second chapel altarpiece on the right depicts the Martyrdom of St Nazarius and Celsus (1606) by Giulio Cesare Procaccini. The spandrels below the dome were frescoed with the evangelists Luke and John by Daniele Crespi, while Mark and Matthew were frescoed by Guglielmo Caccia (il Moncalvo).

Notable are the Baptism of Jesus by Gaudenzio Ferrari and Giovan Battista della Cerva, the Fall of St Paul by Moretto and on the altar of the right transept, an altarpiece by Paris Bordone. The lectern of the choir is by Giuseppe Meda.

In the left transept, within an altar designed by Martino Bassi, is the venerated marble statue of the Assunta by Annibale Fontana (1586) with two later angels by Giulio Cesare Procaccini.

== See also ==
- 16th-century Western domes
