= Annibale Fontana =

Italian artist (1540–1587)

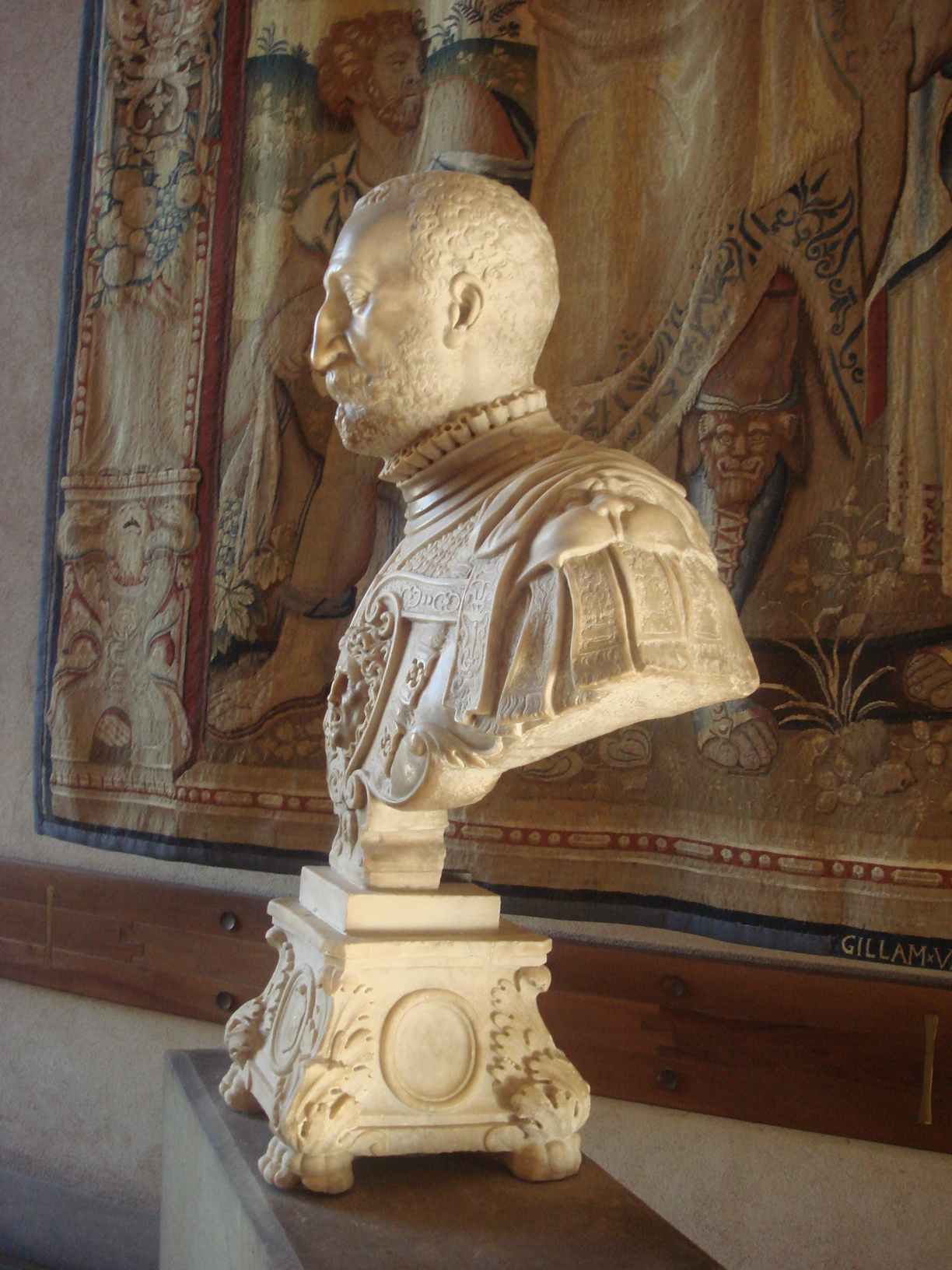
Bust of Ottavio Farnese by Fontana

Annibale Fontana (1540–1587) was an Italian sculptor, medallist and crystal-worker.

Fontana was born in Milan. His first known work is a crystal case, now in the Schatzkammer of Munich, for Albert V of Bavaria (c. 1560-1570). In 1570–1572, he was in Palermo, working for viceroy Francesco Fernardo d'Avalos, of whom he made a portrait on a medal. He returned to Lombardy, where he married Ippolita Saracchi, a member of a famous family of crystal-workers.

Later Fontana worked in the church of Santa Maria presso San Celso, executing the famous statue of the Assumption and numerous statues for the façade and the cross and large bronze candlesticks of the major wing of the Certosa di Pavia.

He died in Milan in 1587.

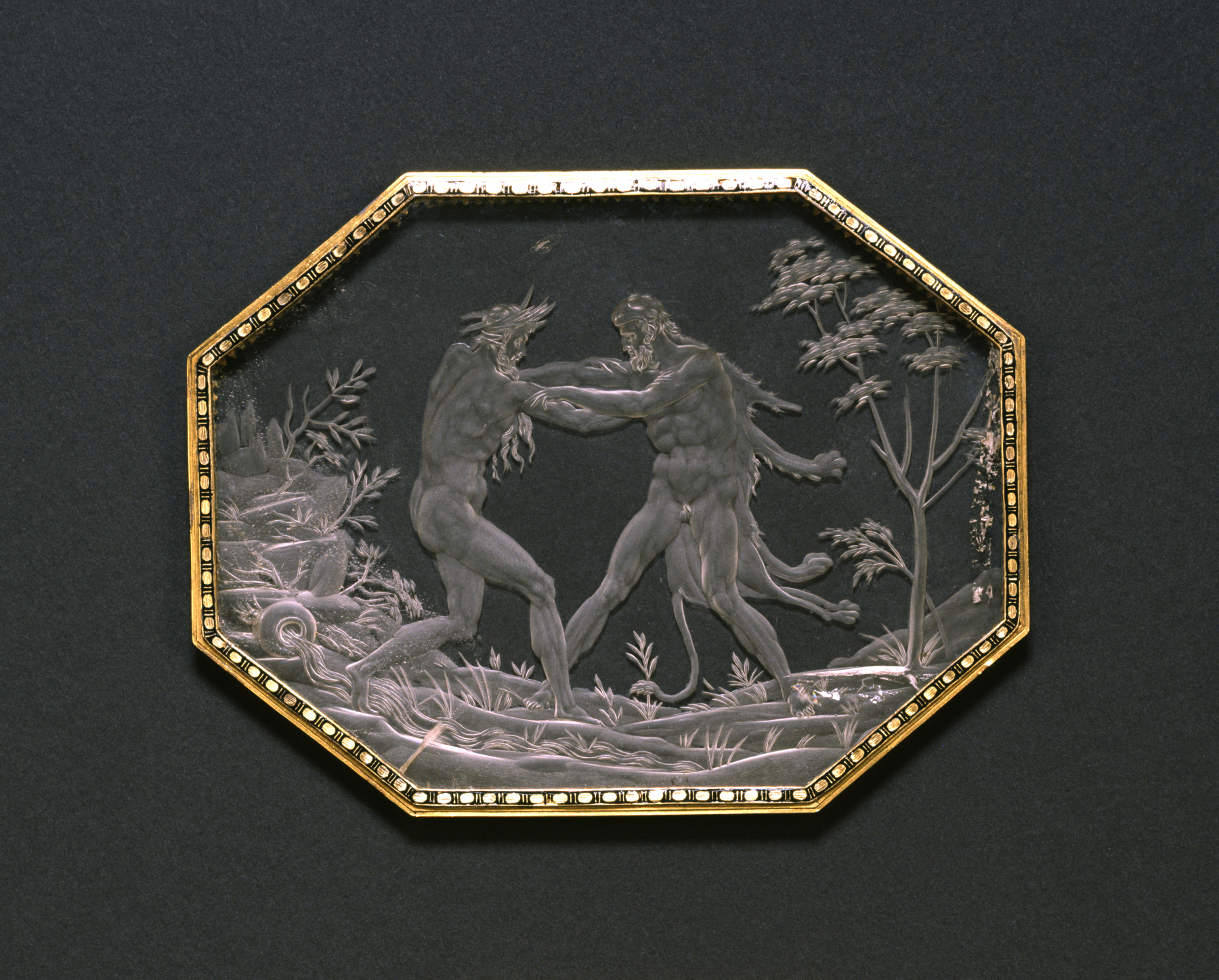
Plaque with Hercules and Achelous, from the collection of The Walters Art Museum
