= Isabella Tovaglieri =

Italian politician

Isabella Tovaglieri MEP
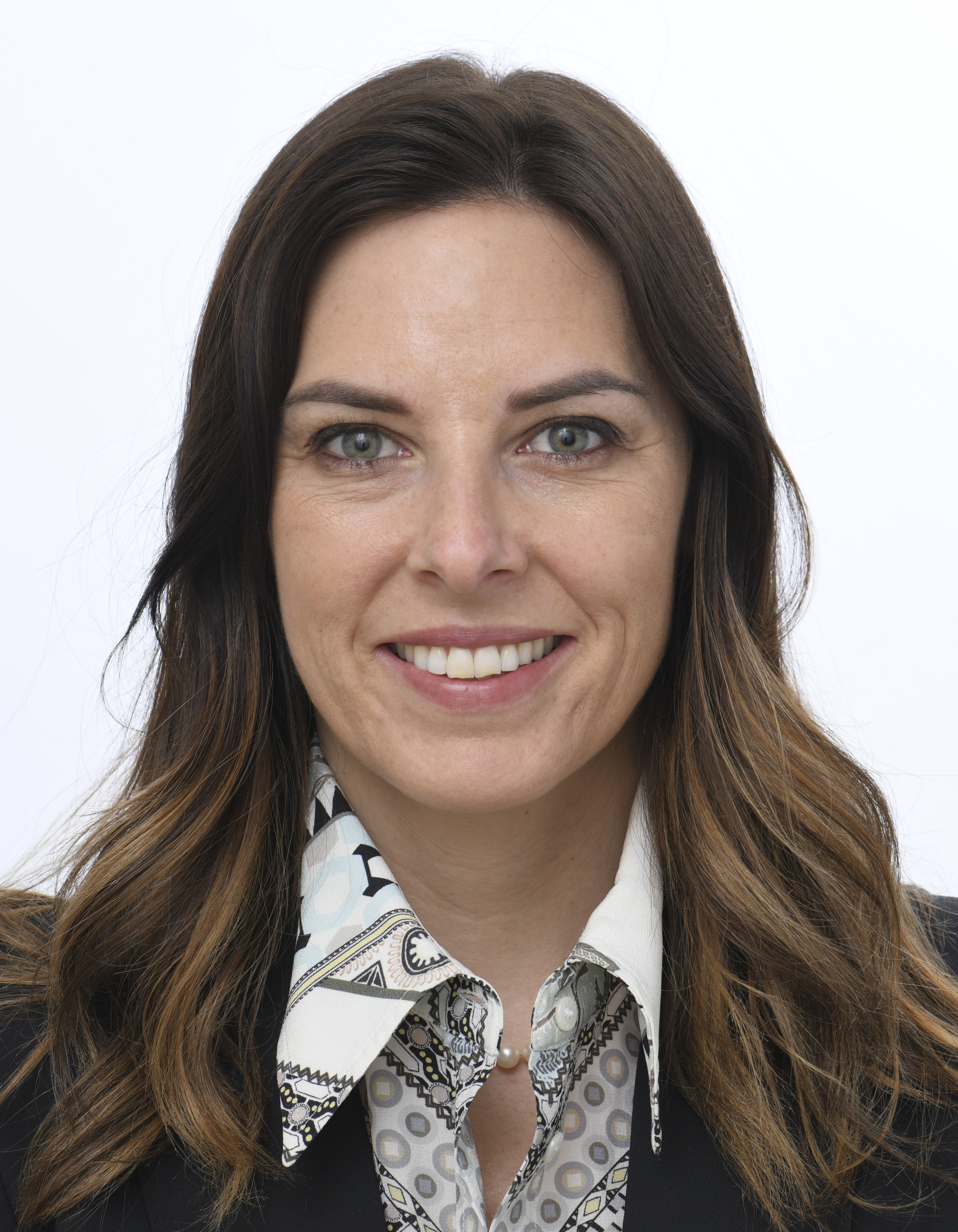

Member of the European Parliament for North-West Italy
- Incumbent
- Assumed office 2 July 2019

Personal details
- Born: 25 June 1987 (age 39) Busto Arsizio, Italy
- Party: League for Salvini Premier
- Education: University Carlo Cattaneo
- Profession: Lawyer

Isabella Tovaglieri (born 25 June 1987 in Busto Arsizio) is an Italian politician and a Member of the European Parliament since 2019. She attened the Liceo Daniele Crespi and the Università Carlo Cattaneo.
