= Liceo Daniele Crespi, Busto Arsizio =

Liceo in Busto Arsizio, Italy

Coordinates: 45.6126°N 8.8533°E

Liceo Daniele Crespi
- View of the Liceo's main building
- Busto Arsizio; Italy

Information
- Established: 1923; 103 years ago
- Head: Giovanni Ferrario
- Gender: Mixed
- Age: 14 to 19
- Enrolment: 1129

The Liceo Daniele Crespi (officially Istituto di Istruzione Secondaria Daniele Crespi) is a public upper-secondary school in Busto Arsizio, Lombardy, Italy, specialising in Classico, Linguistico, and Scienze Umane. Founded in 1923, it is one of the oldest secondary schools in the Alto Milanese area. As of 2026, the school has 1129 students. It is named after the painter, Daniele Crespi.

== History ==
The school was founded in 1923 as a municipally recognised classical school (’‘scuola pareggiata comunale’’). It became a state institution in 1936. For many years, it was the only liceo in the Alto Milanese area, serving students from Busto Arsizio and surrounding municipalities. In 1994, the school introduced a linguistic programme alongside its classical curriculum. In 2010, it expanded its educational provision with the introduction of the Liceo delle Scienze Umane. In 2023, the school celebrated its centenary with a series of cultural events held in Busto Arsizio and the surrounding area.

== Buildings ==
The Piazza Trento Trieste Building

The school operates from two locations in Busto Arsizio. Its main building is situated on Via Giosuè Carducci, while a second building is situated in Piazza Trento e Trieste. The secondary building in Piazza Trento e Trieste was used as a German command post during the Second World War, and subsequently became a former Elementary School. It underwent a €500,000 renovation completed in 2021.

== Notable Alumni ==
- Luigi Giavini (born 1936), Italian historian.
- Isabella Tovaglieri (born 1987), Italian politician; Member of the European Parliament.
