= San Maurizio al Monastero Maggiore =

Church in Milan, Italy

Church of Saint Maurice al Monastero Maggiore (Chiesa di San Maurizio al Monastero Maggiore)
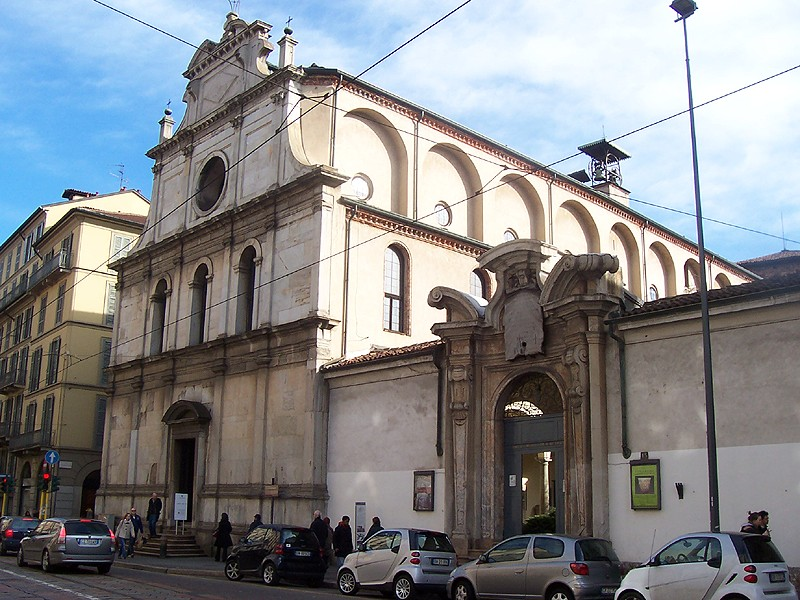
- Façade of the church.

Religion
- Affiliation: Catholic
- Province: Milan
- Year consecrated: 1518
- Status: Active

Location
- Location: Milan, Italy
- Interactive map of Church of Saint Maurice al Monastero Maggiore (Chiesa di San Maurizio al Monastero Maggiore)
- Coordinates: 45.465502°N 9.178921°E

Architecture
- Architects: Gian Giacomo Dolcebuono; Giovanni Antonio Amadeo
- Type: Church
- Style: Renaissance; Baroque
- Groundbreaking: 1503
- Completed: 1518

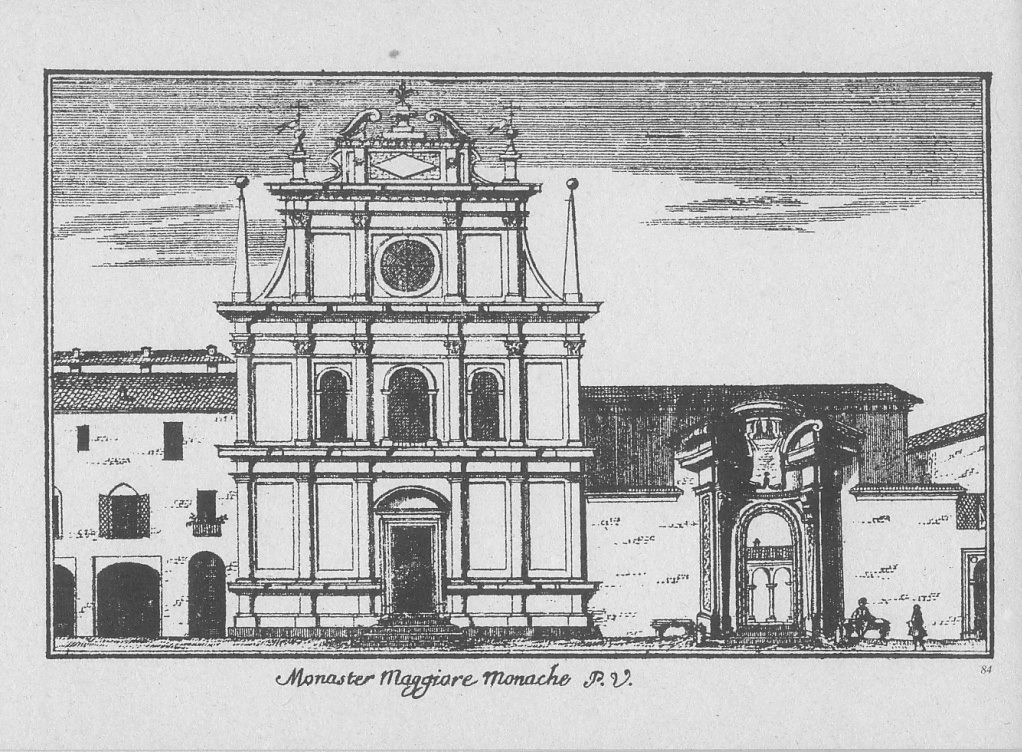
Drawing of the church c. 1745

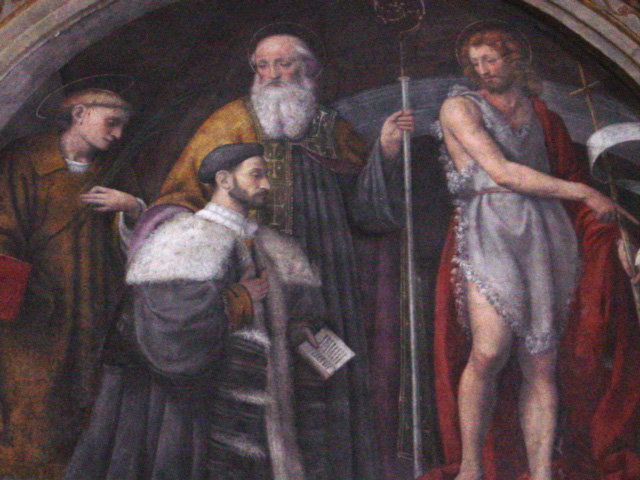
Detail of Bernardino Luini's frescoes

San Maurizio al Monastero Maggiore is a church in Milan, Northern Italy. It was originally attached to the most important female convent of the Benedictines in the city, Monastero Maggiore, which is now in use as the Civic Archaeological Museum. The church today is used every Sunday from October to June to celebrate in the Byzantine Rite, in Greek according to the Italo-Albanian tradition. It is also used as a concert hall.

== History ==
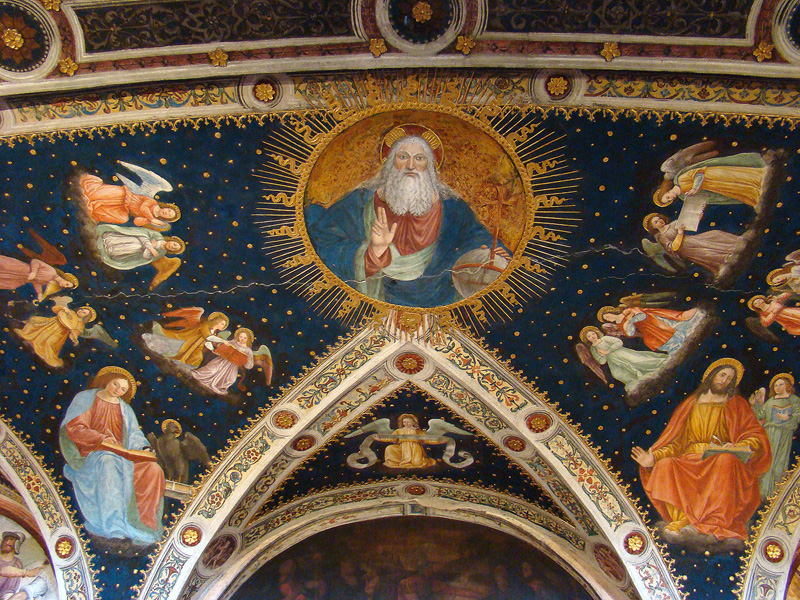
Details of the ceiling.

The complex was founded in Lombard times, partially re-using ancient Roman edifices. Of these, there remain a polygonal tower, a relic of the ancient Maximian walls, and a square one, originally part of the lost Hippodrome and later adopted as the church's bell tower. The monastery is now home to Milan's Archaeological Museum.

The Benedictine Monastery is documented starting from the 8th-9th century. The monastery and its church were initially dedicated to Mary. In 964, the emperor Otto I, donated a relic of St. Maurice to the monastery. There were vast vegetable gardens surrounding the religious complex.

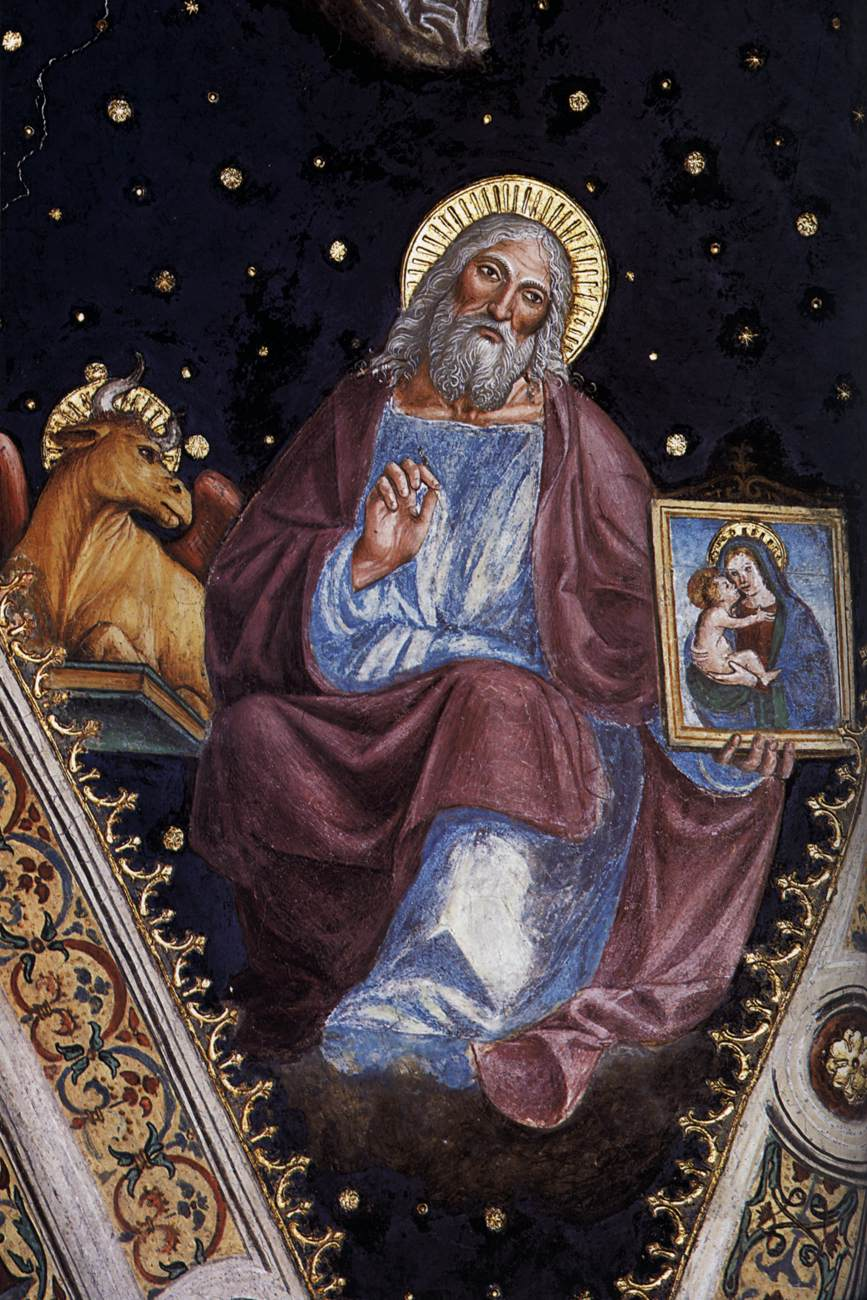
St. Luke, from fresco by Vincenzo Foppa

The church was completely rebuilt, starting in 1503, under the design of Gian Giacomo Dolcebuono in collaboration with Giovanni Antonio Amadeo. The edifice was finished fifteen years later by Cristoforo Solari, divided into two parts: one for the faithful, one for the nuns. In 1864 the monastery became the property of the Municipality.

== Description ==
The façade is covered with grey stone from Ornavasso.

The interior has a vaulted nave separated by the division wall (the nuns followed the mass from a grating) and flanked by groin-vaulted chapels, which are surmounted by a serliana loggia.

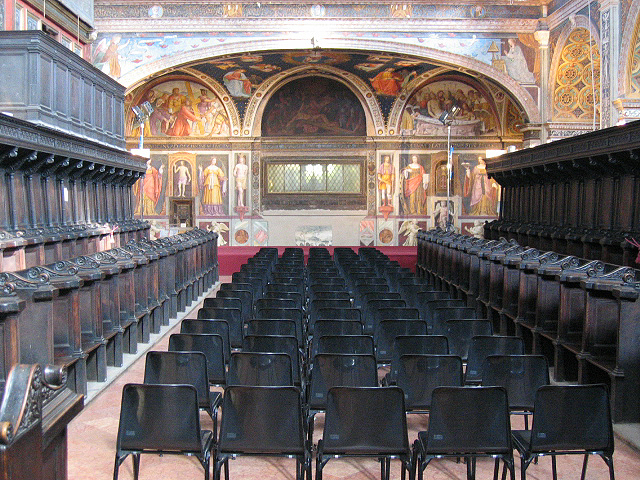
Interior view (nuns' side).

The most important artwork of the church is the cycle of frescoes from the 16th century covering the walls. Ippolita Sforza and her husband Alessandro Bentivoglio appear to be the main patrons of the decoration of the Renaissance church. Ippolita's daughter was a nun at the monastery.

The dividing wall has frescoes depicting the Life of San Maurizio by Bernardino Luini which flank an altarpiece with an Adoration of the Magi by Antonio Campi. The chapels in the faithful's area are by Aurelio Luini, son of Bernardino, and his brothers.

The counterfaçade has a fresco by Simone Peterzano (1573). In the third chapel on the right, the Besozzi chapel, Bernardino Luini frescoed a depiction of the martyrdom of St. Catherine of Alexandria (1530). Frescos are also influed by Forlivese school of art (Melozzo da Forlì and Marco Palmezzano).

=== "Aula delle Monache" ===
The hall of the nuns is also completely painted. The partition wall, a work by Bernardino Luini always the thirties of the sixteenth century, presents images of Saint Catherine, Saint Agatha, the Marriage at Cana, the Carrying of the Cross of Christ on the Cross and Christ died.

On the vault of the hall of the nuns is depicted a starry sky, with God, the Evangelists, and angels. In the end, there is the painting Ecce Homo.

=== Organ ===
In the hall of Nuns there is an organ of 1554 by Giovan Giacomo Antegnati entirely by mechanical transmission, consisting of a keyboard of 50 notes and a pedal 20, constantly united to the keyboard. It is located in the choir loft above the choir stalls, on the right side.

== Sources ==
- Fiorio, M.T. (2000). Bernardino Luini e la pittura del Rinascimento a Milano: gli affreschi di San Maurizio al Monastero Maggiore. Milan.
- Bartoli, Francesco (1776–1777). Notizia delle pitture, sculture, ed architetture, che ornano le chiese, e gli altri luoghi pubblici di tutte le più rinomate città d'Italia e di non poche terre, castella, e ville d'alcuni rispettivi distretti. Volume one. Venice: Presso Antonio Savioli. p. 204.
