= Gian Giacomo Dolcebuono =

Italian sculptor

Gian Giacomo Quadri, known as Dolcebuono (c. 1445 – 1504) was an Italian architect and sculptor.

Born probably in Lugano, he was a relative of Giacomo Antonio Dolcebuono, who had provided one of the first projects for the façade of the Certosa di Pavia. Quadri apprenticed in the Milanese workshop of Giovanni and Guiniforte Solari together with Giovanni Antonio Amadeo. Already present in the city's Duomo, in 1473 he executed decorations for the church of Santa Maria presso San Celso and for the major cloister and the façade of the Certosa di Pavia.

In 1488, again together with Amadeo, he replaced Cristoforo Rocchi in the construction of the Pavia Cathedral. Two years later the two stated the construction of the dome and the tambour of the Duomo of Milan. Again with Amadeo, he designed the church of San Maurizio al Monastero Maggiore.

He died in Milan in 1504.
