= Cristoforo Lombardo =

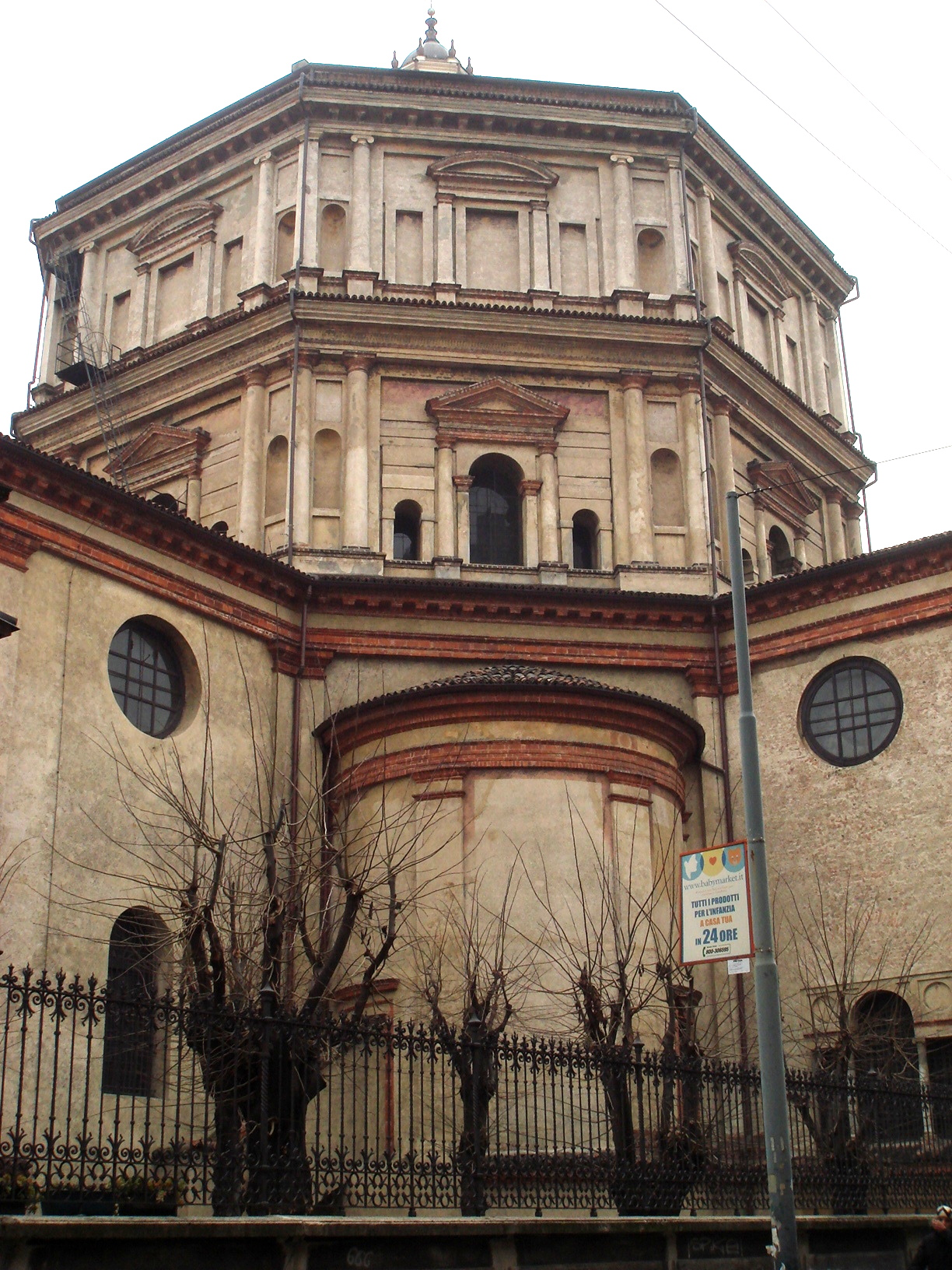
- The octagonal dome of Santa Maria della Passione
- Born: c. 1490; Pavia, Duchy of Milan
- Died: September 1555; Milan, Duchy of Milan
- Other name: il Lombardino
- Known for: sculpture, architecture

Cristoforo Lombardo (c. 1490 – September 1555), also known as il Lombardino, was an Italian Renaissance sculptor and architect.

== Life ==
Cristoforo was the son of Domenico, a sculptor active in Milan from the beginning of the 16th century. He first trained as a mason, probably in the workshop of Milan Cathedral, but then dedicated himself to sculpture. The earliest documented information about his life is a payment dated 16 July 1510 from the Veneranda Fabbrica del Duomo di Milano (the institution responsible for the construction of Milan Cathedral). A second record, dated 21 August 1514, confirms his readmission to the Fabbrica following a stay of several months in Rome in 1513–14. Apart from a brief period in Bologna, Cristoforo worked primarily in Milan and other Lombard towns, and was involved with the Milan Cathedral project throughout his life.

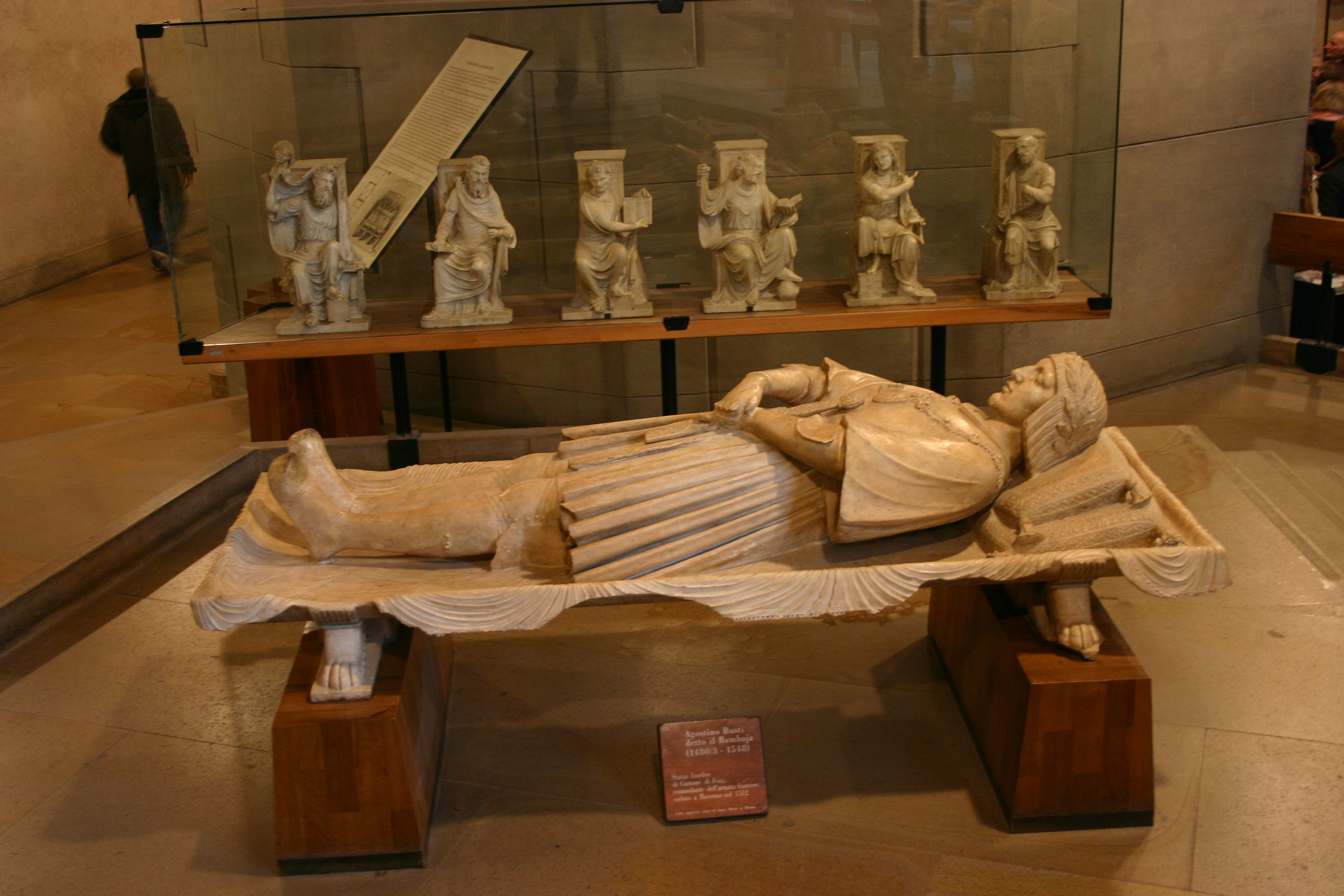
The funerary monument to Gaston de Foix, in the Museo d'arte antica, Sforza Castle, Milan.

Between 1516 and 1517, he designed the tomb of Giovan Battista Barbavara in the church of Sant'Angelo, Milan. In the following years, he collaborated with Agostino Busti, also known as il Bambaia, on the funerary monuments of Lancino Curzio (Milan, Sforza Castle) and Gaston de Foix (begun c. 1517; dismembered; fragments in Milan, Biblioteca Ambrosiana, Sforza Castle and elsewhere). In 1518 he was commissioned to build a pinnacle and two rainwater ducts beneath the lantern staircase of Milan Cathedral. In 1519, he created a marble monument for the Tolentini family chapel in Santa Maria Incoronata. Completed in 1521, the work is crafted entirely from black and white marble and reveal the stylistic influence of Busti and Andrea Fusina. After Andrea Fusina's death on 15 January 1526, Lombardo was appointed engineer of the Veneranda Fabbrica del Duomo, a position that he held until his death.

In January 1531, Lombardo was commissioned the funerary monument for Nicolò Dolzani in the Church of San Sisto, Piacenza. During the 1530s, he oversaw the renovation and expansion of the Palazzo Stampa di Soncino, Milan. The most notable features of the palace designed by Lombardo are the lofty tower and the main courtyard. Particularly significant is the tower, which consists of three stacked rectangular blocks that decrease in size from bottom to top. During this period, Lombardo continued to work on Milan Cathedral. From 1538 he was engaged on plans for the north portal (on the site of the present-day altar of the Madonna dell'Albero). Lombardo's work for the cathedral also included designs for some of the religious furnishings, often in collaboration with Bambaia.

In his capacity as engineer of the Veneranda Fabbrica del Duomo, Lombardo was often called on to supervise and advise on other religious buildings in Milan and Lombardy. In February 1525, he completed the shrine of St. Peter and St. Marcellinus in the church of San Tommaso in Cremona. From 1530 he added an ambulatory around the presbytery of the church of Santa Maria presso San Celso, designed by Donato Bramante. Between the 1530s and 1550s, he was involved in the construction of the octagonal dome with two superimposed tiers for the Church of Santa Maria della Passione, which formed part of the monastic complex of the Lateran Canons. Around 1542, he worked on the upper section of the façade of the Certosa di Pavia, continuing the work begun by Giovanni Antonio Amadeo.

Lombardo's final projects included the sacristy of the Sanctuary of the Blessed Virgin of Miracles in Saronno (1546–1547), the Church of Santa Caterina della Chiusa, destroyed in 1826 and only known through 19th-century drawings by Luigi Cagnola, and the completion of the Trivulzio Chapel in San Nazaro in Brolo (1547).

== Bibliography ==
- Loi, Maria Cristina (2005). "LOMBARDO, Cristoforo, detto il Lombardino". Dizionario Biografico degli Italiani (in Italian). Vol. 65: Levis–Lorenzetti. Rome: Institute of the Italian Encyclopaedia. ISBN 978-88-12-00032-6.
- Scotti Tosini, Aurora (2003). "Lombardo, Cristoforo [il Lombardino]". Grove Art Online. Oxford: Oxford University Press. doi:10.1093/gao/9781884446054.article.T051639.
- Mezzanotte, Paolo (1943). "Santa Caterina alla Chiusa e Cristoforo Lombardo". Palladio. VII: 23–26.
- Morscheck, Charles R. (1978). Relief sculpture for the façade of the Certosa di Pavia. New York: Garland Publishing.
