= Daniele Crespi =

Italian painter (1598 – 1630)

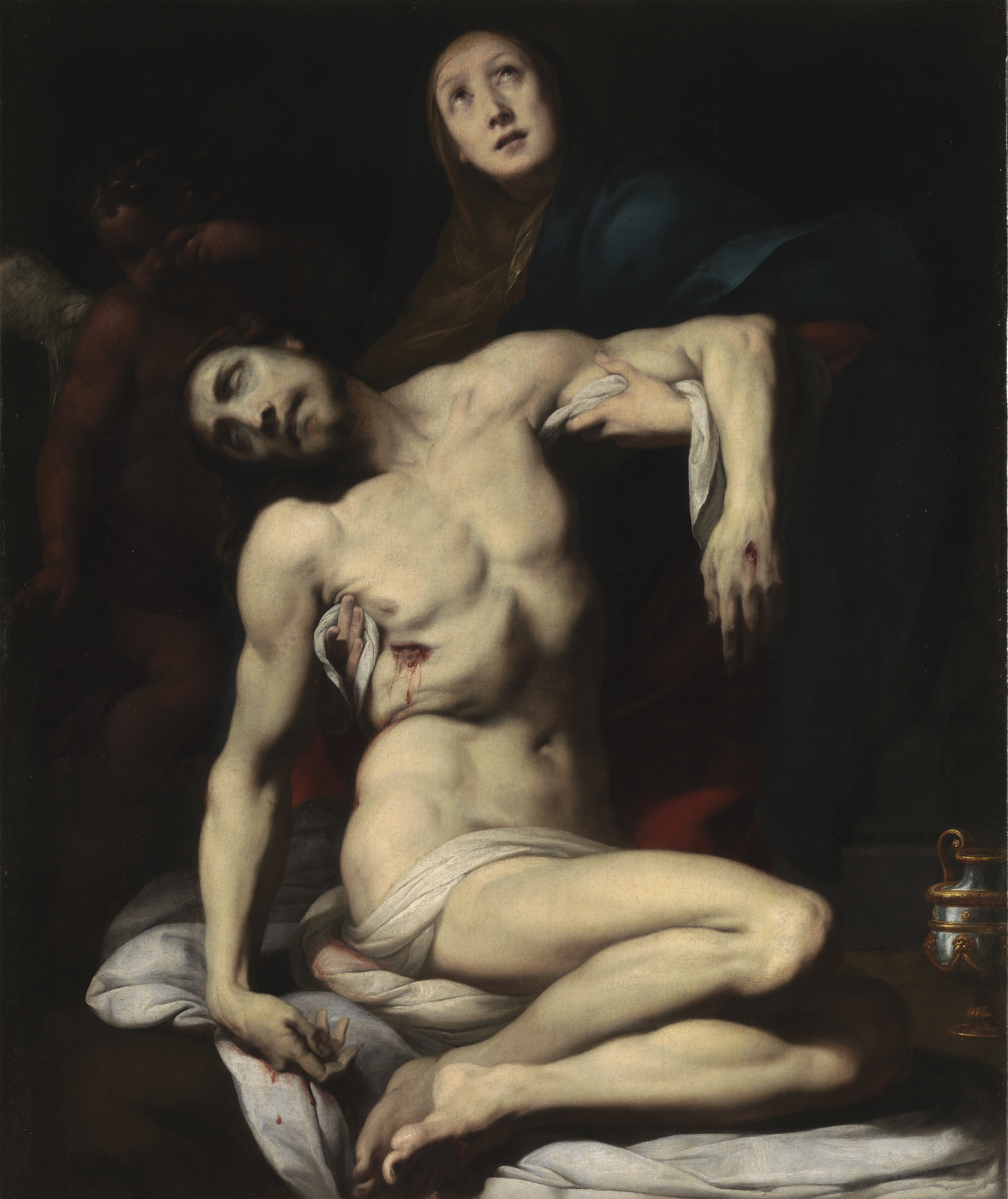
- Pietà, 1626, Museo del Prado, Madrid
- Born: 1598; Milan, Duchy of Milan
- Died: 19 July 1630 (aged 31–32); Milan, Duchy of Milan
- Education: Guglielmo Caccia
- Known for: Painting
- Movement: Baroque

Daniele Crespi (1598 – 19 July 1630) was an Italian painter and draughtsman. He is regarded as one of the most original artists working in Milan in the 1620s. He broke away from the exaggerated manner of Lombard Mannerism in favour of an early Baroque style, distinguished by clarity of form and content. A prolific history painter, he was also known for his portraits.

== Life ==
=== Early life and education ===
Daniele Crespi was born in a family that was originally from Busto Arsizio. It is not clear whether he himself was born in Busto Arsizio or in Milan. The date of his birth is not known with certainty, with estimates ranging from 1591 to 1598. His training is not well documented and he is first recorded in 1619 as working with local painter Guglielmo Caccia, called Moncalvo, working on an assignment in a church of San Vittore al Corpo, Milan. Moncalvo frescoed Sibyls and Angels (1617) in the cupola of the church; the Four Evangelists in the pendentives are traditionally attributed to Daniele. These heavily restored frescoes of rather awkward muscular figures have little in common with Moncalvo’s style and, in their present state, are awkwardly Emilian in character.

More significant for understanding Crespi’s later development are the three canvases of scenes from the Life of St. Anthony and his fresco decorations (c. 1619) in the chapel of Sant'Antonio in the same church. These pictures are typical of a young painter grappling with the style of his elders; the large, rhythmic and rather flat forms reflect a study of the work of Giovanni Battista Crespi, called Cerano, and particularly of Giulio Cesare Procaccini.

Other early works, such as the frescoes of the Four Evangelists in the pendentives of the chapel of the Annunciation in Sant'Eustorgio, Milan (1621; the altarpiece, the Annunciation, was found in Santa Maria al Paradiso, Milan), and the fresco of the Adoration of the Magi (c. 1621) in the sacristy of Sant'Alessandro in Zebedia, display similar features. The Adoration reworks an Adoration of the Magi by Cerano (ex-Parish Church, Pusiano); the frescoes in Sant'Eustorgio are indebted to Cerano, Procaccini and the Emilian followers of Correggio.

=== Mature work ===
In 1623, Crespi received the first of two payments (the second was in 1626) for painting part of a frieze in Santa Maria di Campagna, Piacenza. The chapel of San Giovanni Battista, formerly in San Protasio ad Monachos, Milan, also dates from 1623. The altarpiece, St. John the Baptist Preaching in the Desert, two lateral canvases, St. John Pointing to Christ and the Infant St. John in the Wilderness, and two detached frescoes, St. Bartholomew and St. James (all Busto Arsizio, San Giovanni Battista), with their stark, simple narratives and new clarity of form, mark the point at which Crespi abandoned the formal, rhythmic exaggerations of his earlier work.

This change of style may have been inspired by a trip to Rome. Certainly, Crespi’s contact with Piacenza must have been relevant, for there he would have seen work, now scattered, by Giovanni Lanfranco. It is clear from his paintings of St. John the Baptist that Crespi admired Lanfranco’s combination of Emilian clarity and Caravaggesque naturalism and chiaroscuro. Crespi drew on a wide range of Lombard and Emilian sources, and the chronology of his oeuvre is hard to determine.

The remarkable works painted for Santa Maria della Passione, Milan, probably date also from the early 1620s. A set of organ shutters for the south organ depicts Christ Washing the Feet of the Disciples when closed; when open, they show the Raising of the Cross and the Deposition. The latter, single, compositions crowd the tall and narrow shutters with passionate and intensely dramatic figures; they are intelligent reconsiderations of Lombard sources. By contrast, the Christ Washing the Feet of the Disciples is a stark, architecturally ordered presentation. Less secure is an early date for the Supper of St. Charles Borromeo, a large picture painted for the same church. This, painted in simple blacks, reds and whites, shows a steeply foreshortened room containing a strikingly immediate image of the saint, seated alone at a table. Two figures in the background are amazed to see his frugal meal, and the viewer, coming on the saint from the opposite direction, seems also to be a secret witness to his austerity. Parallels have been drawn between this painting and the work of Francisco de Zurbarán, but no direct contact between the two artists has been demonstrated.

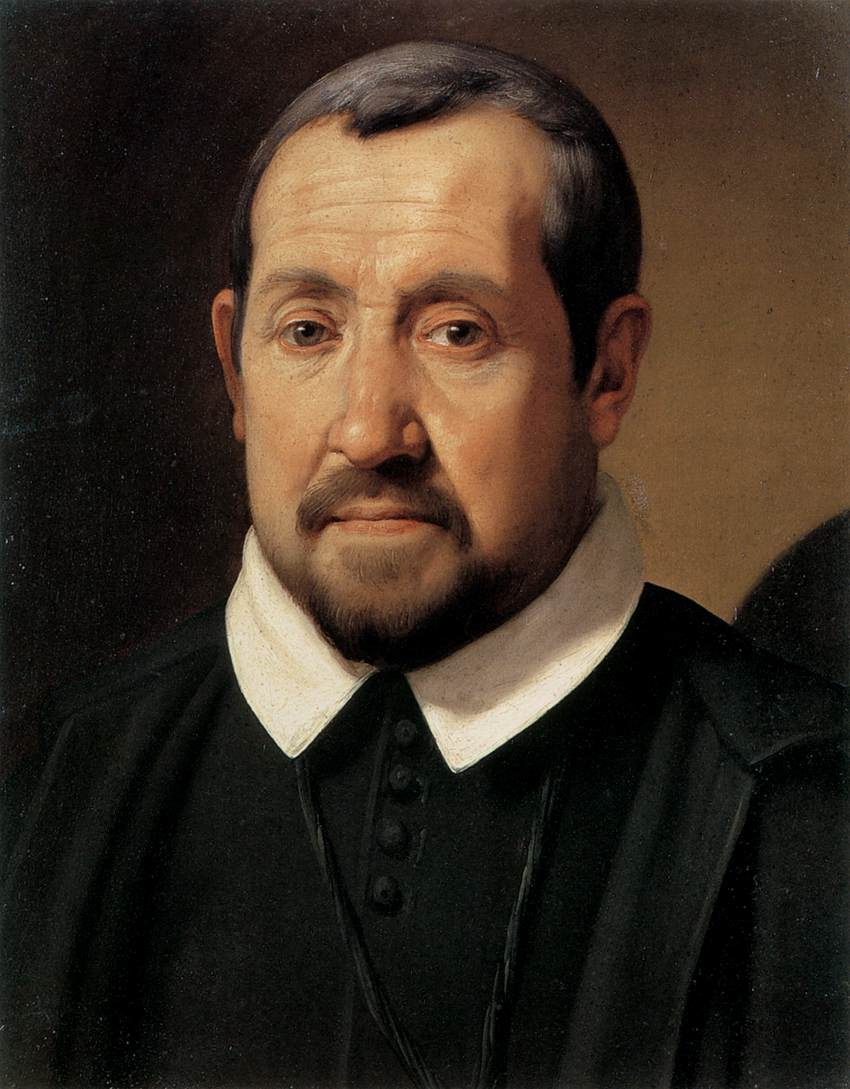
Portrait of Antonio Olgiati, 1621–1622, priv. col.

Crespi’s other works of the 1620s never achieved this pitch of psychological tension. The Martyrdom of St. Mark (1626; Novara, San Marco) is again based on Milanese models; it is the logical, reformed continuation of such large pictures as Cerano’s Baptism of St. Augustine and Camillo Procaccini’s St. Ambrose and St. Augustine Disputing (both 1618; Milan, San Marco). Throughout the 1620s, Crespi’s production continued to be prolific. Such works as the Road to Calvary (Milan, Pinacoteca di Brera), the Entombment (Budapest, Mus. F.A.) and the Pietà (Madrid, Museo del Prado) are possibly from the middle of the decade. The last two are remarkably indebted to the melting, emotional tenor of Giulio Cesare Procaccini’s work. Other altarpieces, probably from the very end of the 1620s, are grander and more classical. These include the Last Supper (Milan, Pinacoteca di Brera), the Coronation of the Virgin (Modena, Galleria Estense), the Baptism (Milan, Pinacoteca di Brera) and the Virgin and Child with St. Francis and St. Charles Borromeo (Milan, Pinacoteca di Brera).

=== Later career ===
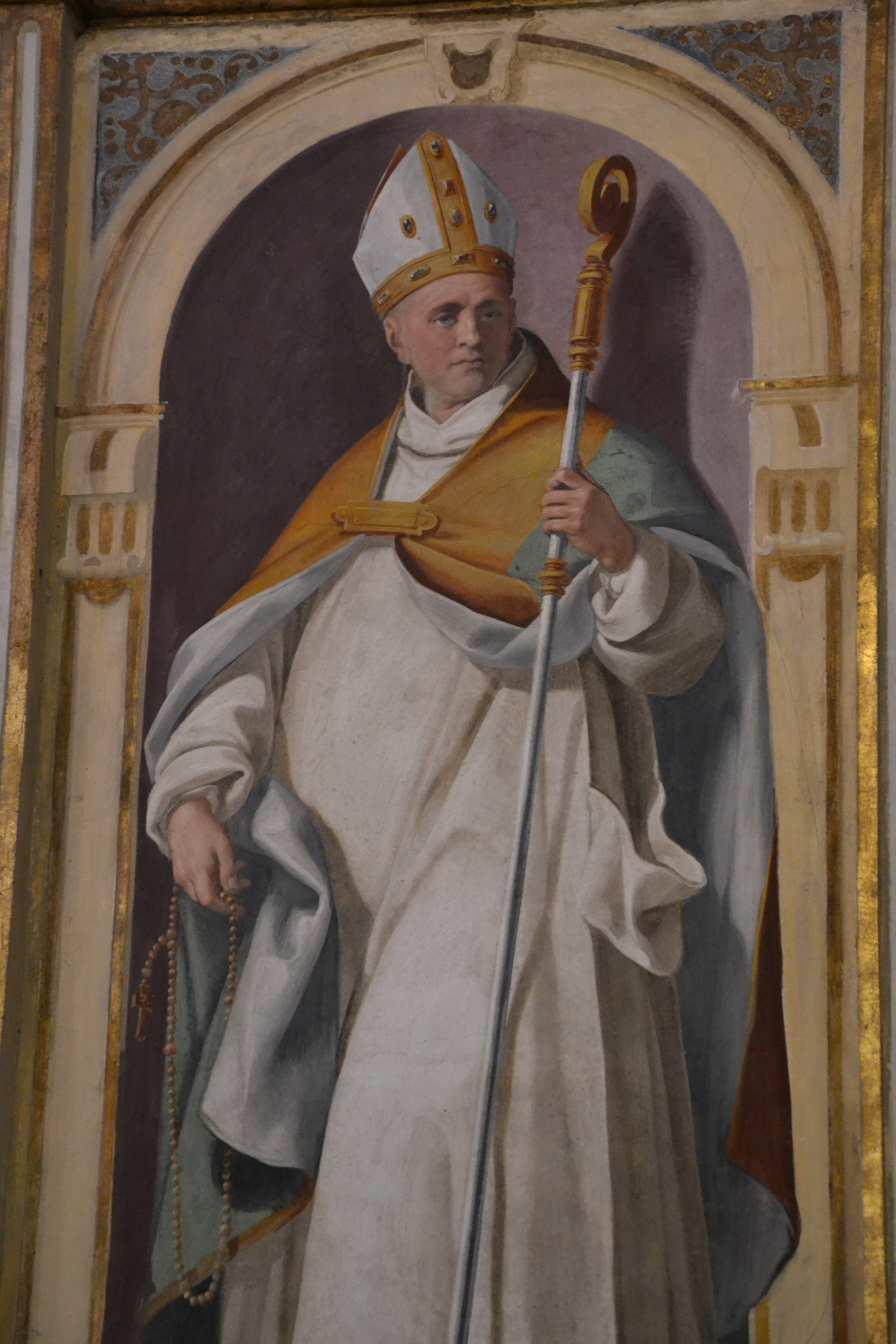
St. Bruno, Garegnano Charterhouse

In 1629, Crespi completed a large fresco cycle for the Carthusian Order in the nave of the Garegnano Charterhouse. A year later, in 1630, he painted a second, larger cycle for the same Order in the apse and choir of the Certosa di Pavia, where there is also an altarpiece by the artist, Christ in Glory with Ten Saints, dedicated in 1628. The frescoes, among the first artistic results of the Carthusian reorganization in the 1620s, are painted in light, almost pastel colours. Along the nave and entrance wall of the Garegnano Charterhouse are seven scenes from the Life of St. Bruno, the founder of the Carthusians, and full-length portraits of monks and nuns. The ceiling is elaborately divided into hexagonal fields with representations of the Resurrected Christ, the Magdalene in Glory, the Sacrifice of Isaac and St. John the Baptist. The figures are further divided from one another by bands of half-length portraits of Carthusians and triangular fields of angels. Crespi placed the events of St. Bruno’s life in the context of the saints of the Order and of sacred figures representing the Carthusian virtues: sacrifice, obedience and contemplation. His artistic sources are those that always inspired him: Cerano, Giulio Cesare Procaccini and Lanfranco. His art is close to that of Alessandro Tiarini, a painter whose work Crespi would have known and, in the case of the Carthusian cycles, to Vincenzo Carducci’s paintings (1626–32; e.g. Madrid, Museo del Prado) for the Monastery of El Paular, near Segovia, though direct contact with the latter has not been demonstrated. The frescoes Crespi made for the Certosa di Pavia are increasingly monumental and simplified, close in style to the late altarpieces. The cycle, presumably begun in the spring of 1629, is iconographically more complex than that at Garegnano and includes scenes from the Life of Christ (the Christ Disputing in the Temple is dated 1630) below those from the Life of St. Bruno.

In June 1630, Crespi left Pavia to return to his family in Milan, where plague had broken out. He perished in the epidemic, along with his mother, wife and two sons. Among his pupils was Melchiorre Giraldini.

== Work ==
Crespi was mainly active as a painter of religious subjects used as decoration for churches. He was also known for his sensitive portraits. He was an excellent colourist, known for the simplistic beauty of his compositions. His best works include a series of pictures from the life of Saint Bruno (now in the Garegnano Charterhouse in Milan) and a depiction of the Stoning of St. Stephen (in Brera).

Another masterpiece is the dark 1628 Supper of St Carlo Borromeo in the church of Santa Maria della Passione in Milan, one of the best-known early 17th-century paintings in northern Italy. Other works by him can be found in Milan and Pavia (Pavia Cathedral and Certosa di Pavia).

The Conversion of Saint Paul, painted about 1623, is considered to be the artist's finest painting in the United States (at the Blanton Museum of Art in Austin). When compared to Caravaggio's earlier work in the Cerasi Chapel, it shows the persistence of Crespi's Mannerist traits.

Crespi was also well known as a portrait painter. Though much work on attribution and identification remains to be done, it is documented that his portraits were sought after and that he was admired by learned patrons. In 1625 Sigismondo Boldoni, professor of philosophy at the University of Pavia, wrote to request Alessandro Monti’s help in procuring a reduced version of one of Crespi’s portraits. That the artist moved in scholarly circles is also suggested by the inventory of his books made after his death, which shows that he possessed all the standard late 16th-century treatises on art.

Unlike most of the Lombards, Daniele often made preparatory drawings for his paintings. A number of compositional studies survive as do studies of details and single figures. Such a method of working is typical of the academies in Bologna and central Italy and constitutes a significant link between Crespi and the Emilian early Baroque. Some of his drawings have been attributed to Emilian painters, such as Alessandro Tiarini or even Correggio, though others have been identified under the names of Giulio Cesare Procaccini and Morazzone.

== Legacy ==
In 1923, the new liceo Classico of Busto Arsizio was named 'Liceo Daniele Crespi'.

== Gallery ==
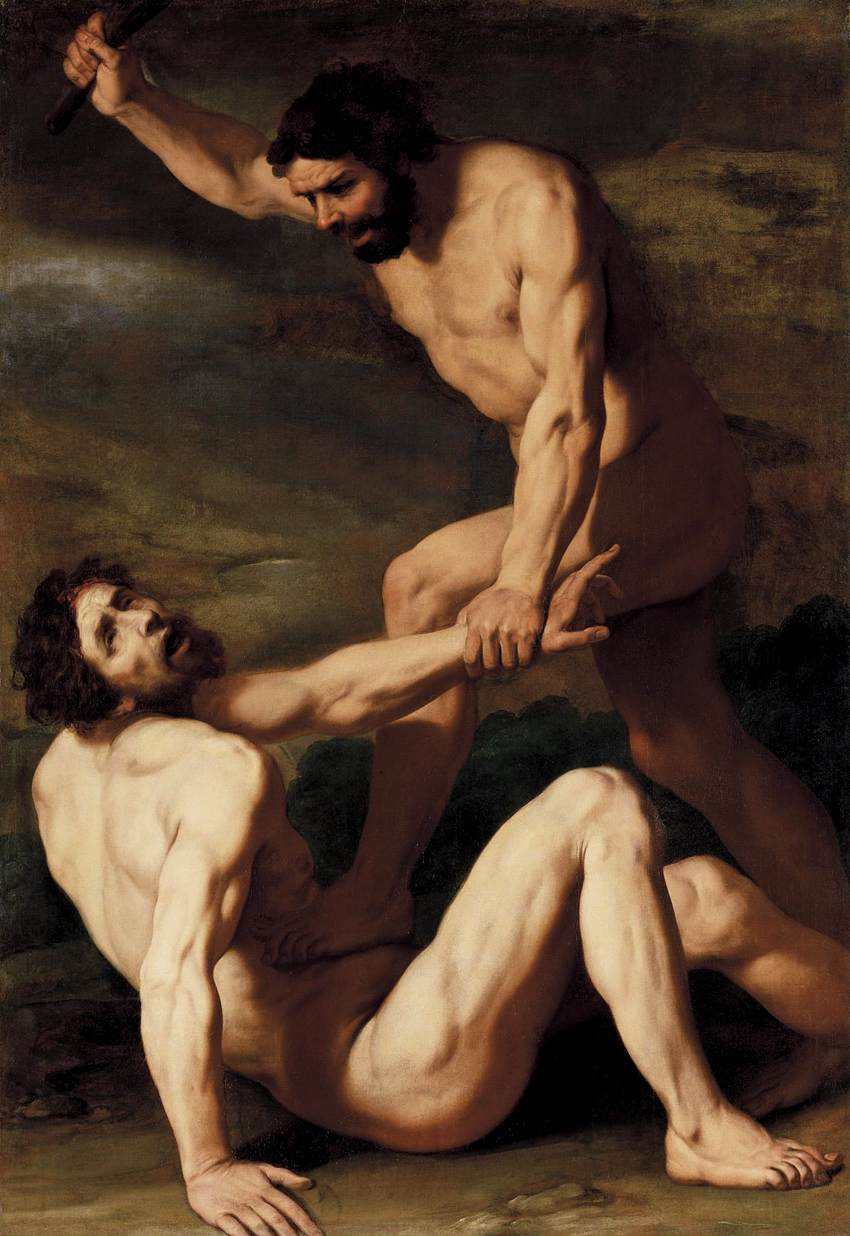
Cain Killing Abel, c. 1618–1620, priv. col.

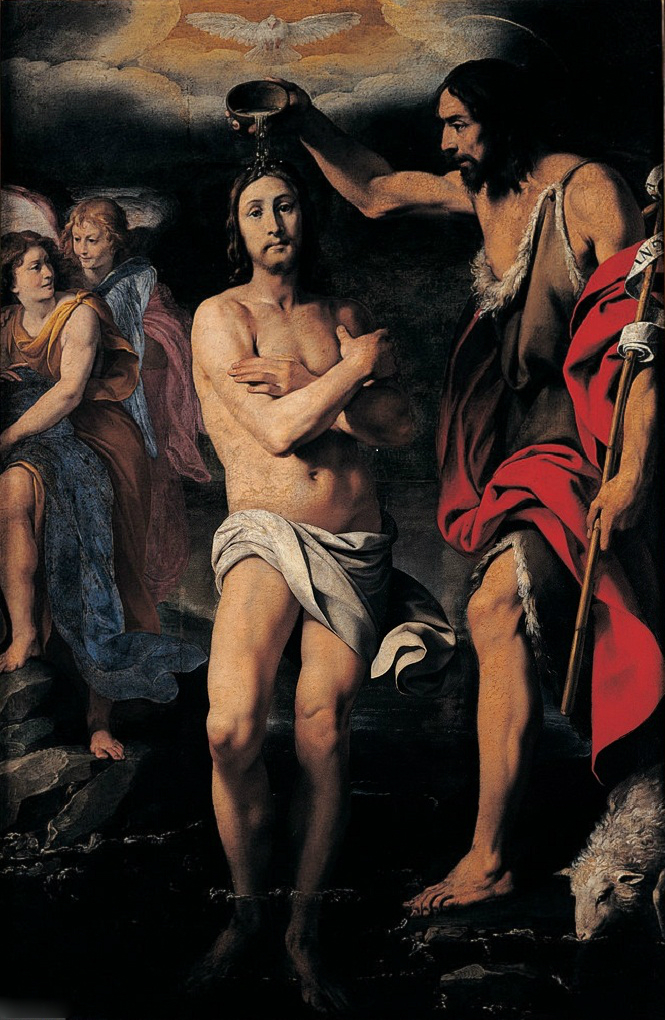
The Baptism of Christ, c. 1629–1630, Pinacoteca di Brera, Milano

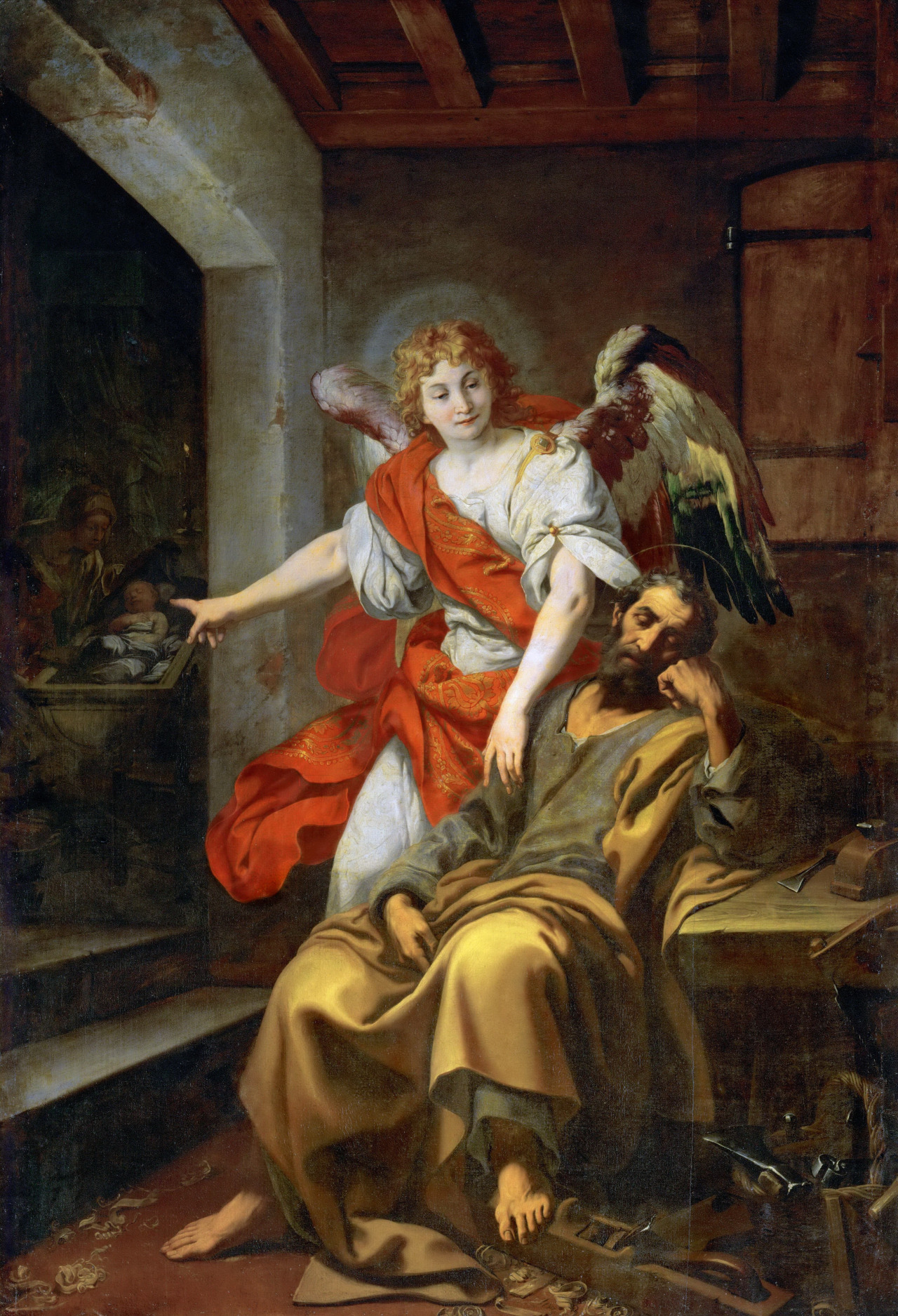
Saint Joseph’s Dream, c. 1620–1630, Kunsthistorisches Museum, Vienna

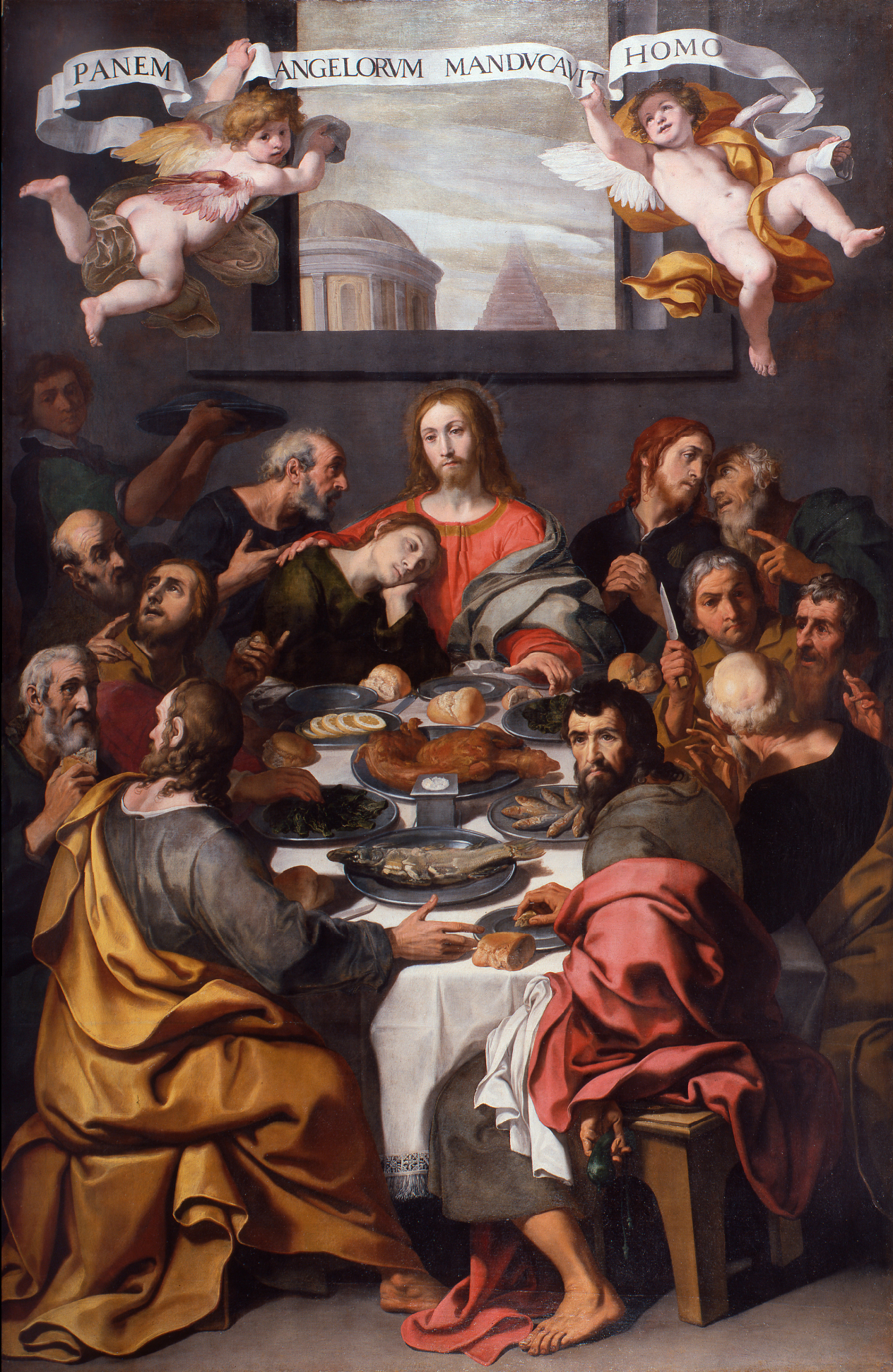
The Last Supper, 1624–1625, Pinacoteca di Brera, Milan

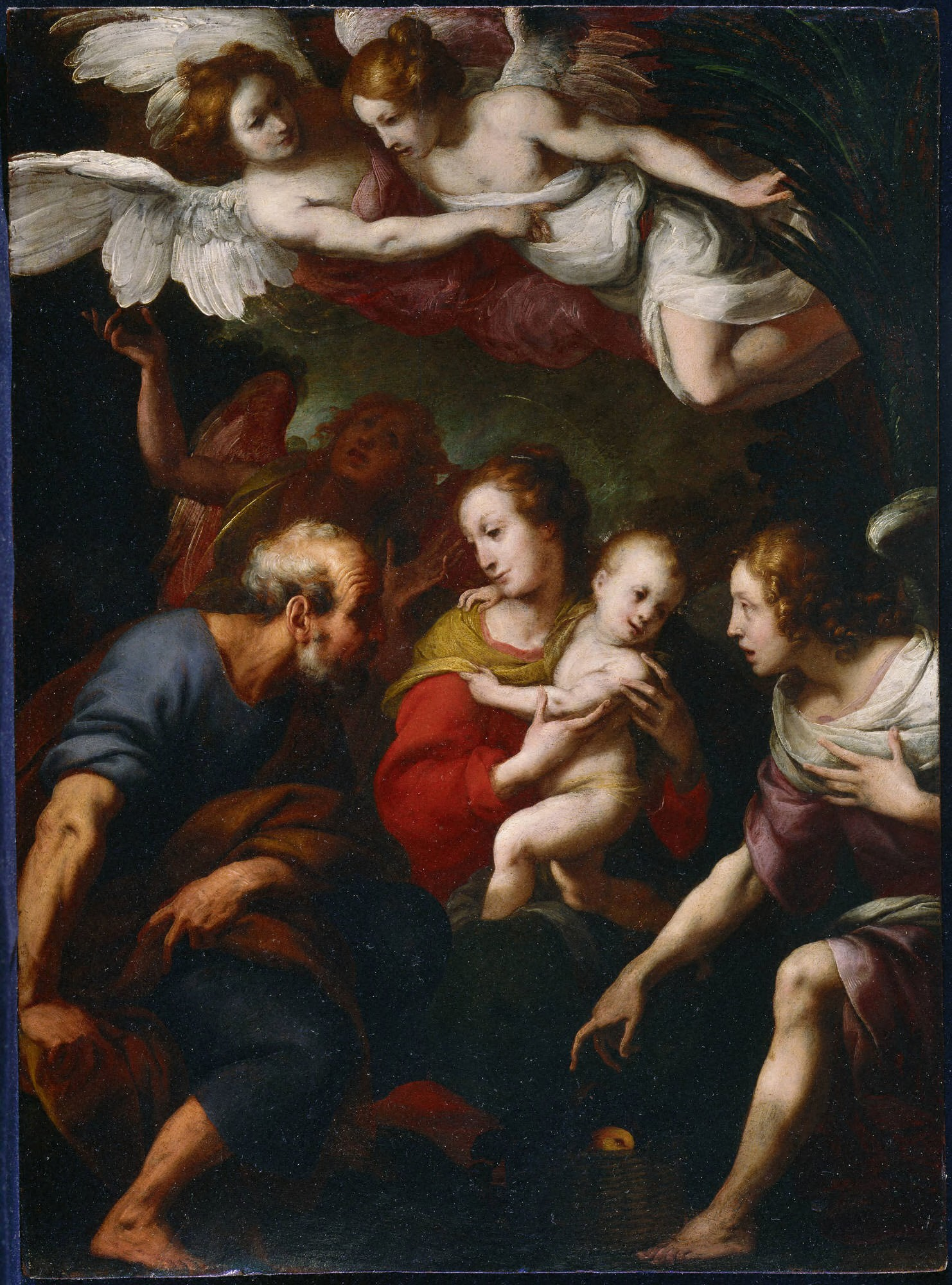
The Angel's Message to Joseph, Princeton University Art Museum, Princeton, New Jersey

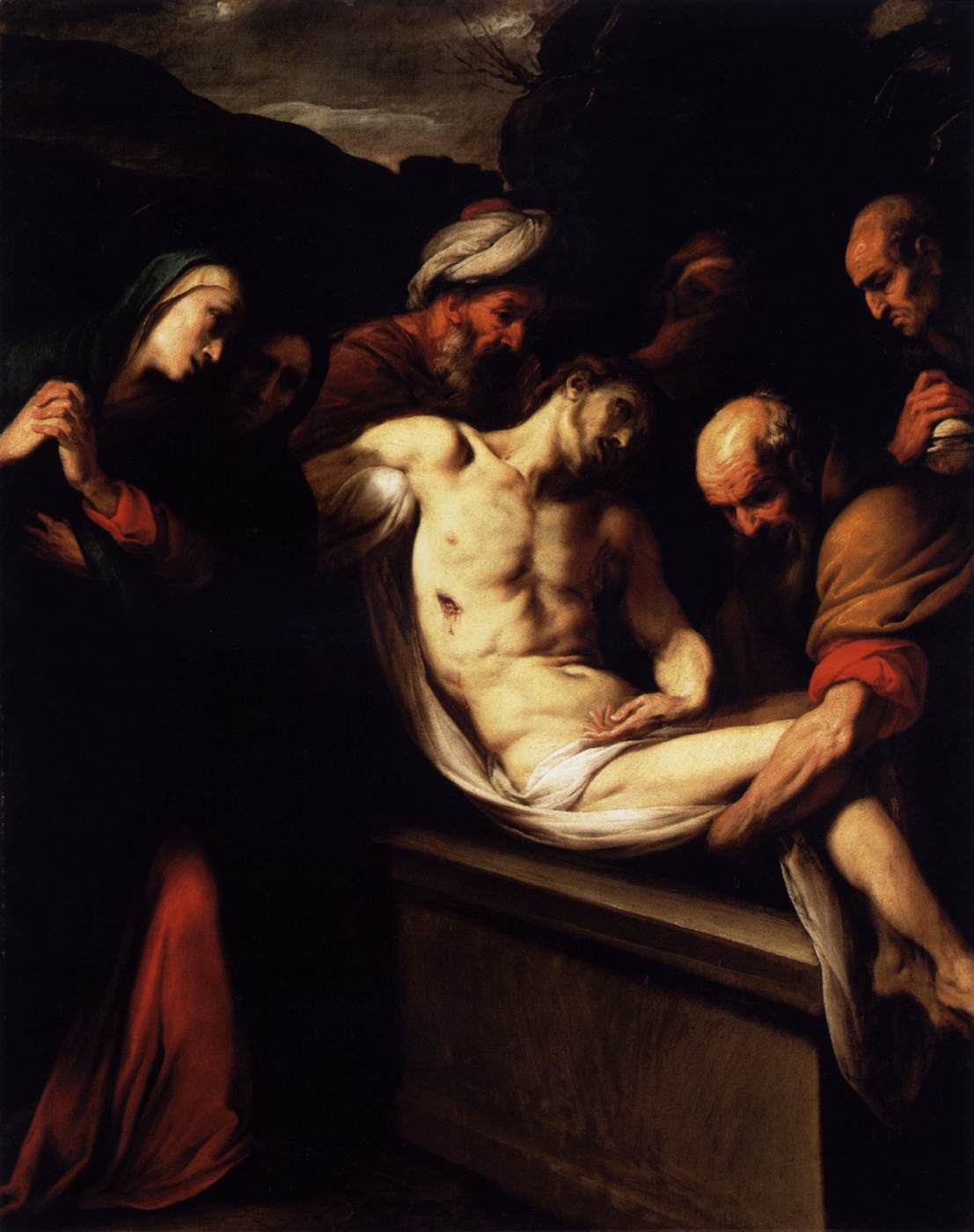
The Entombment of Christ, c. 1620, Museum of Fine Arts, Budapest

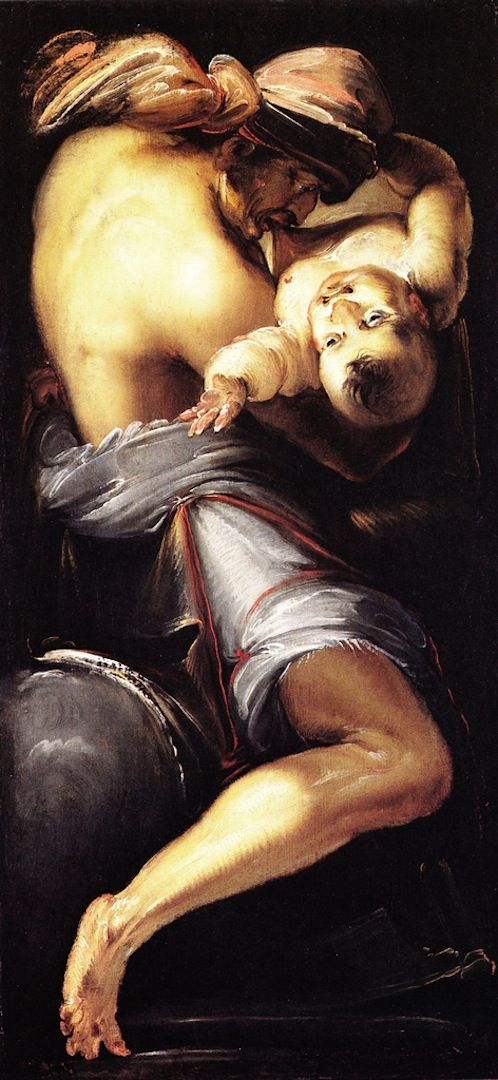
Saturn Devouring His Children, 1619, priv. col.

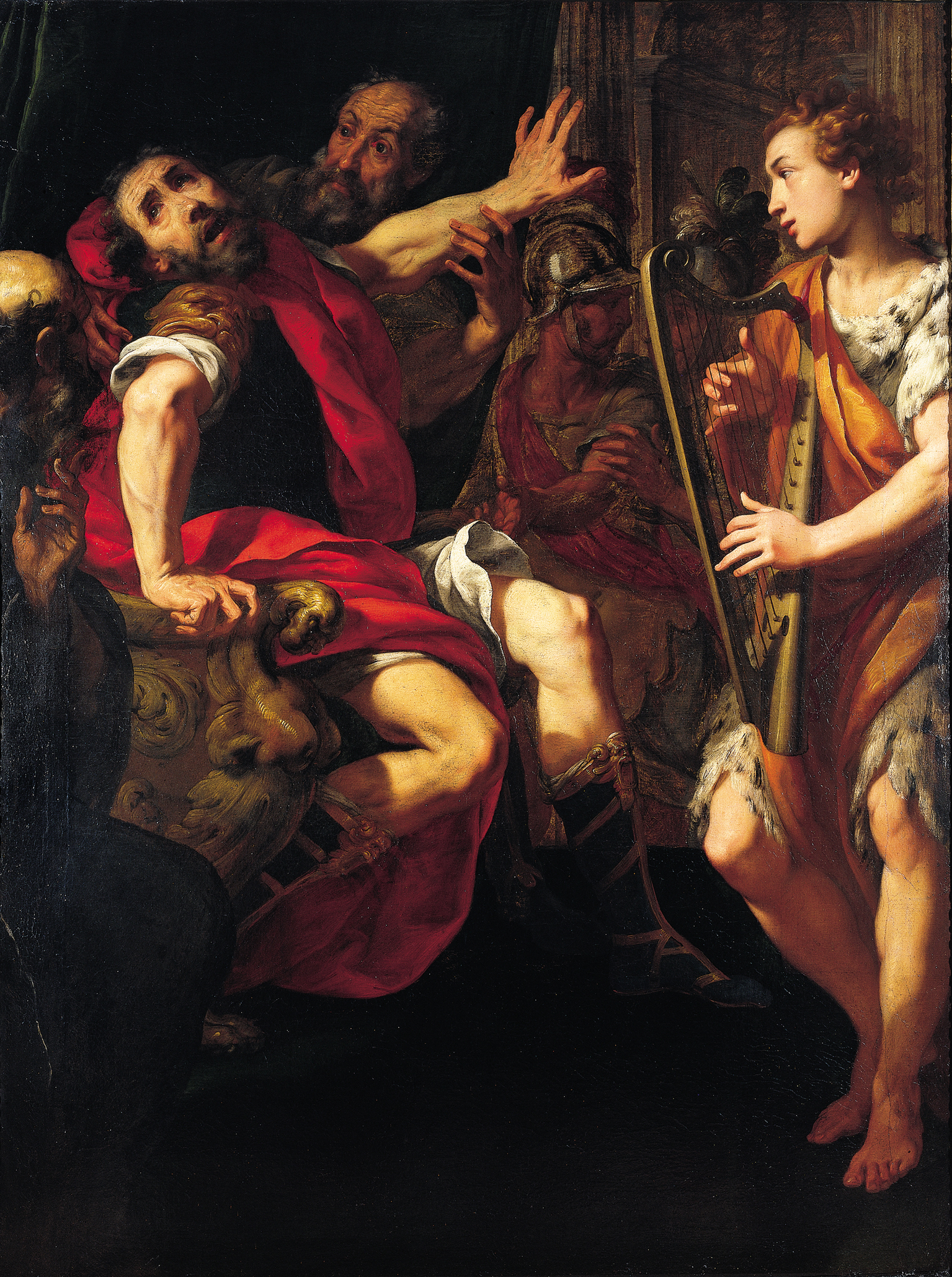
David appeases King Saul's anger, 1625–1626, priv. col.

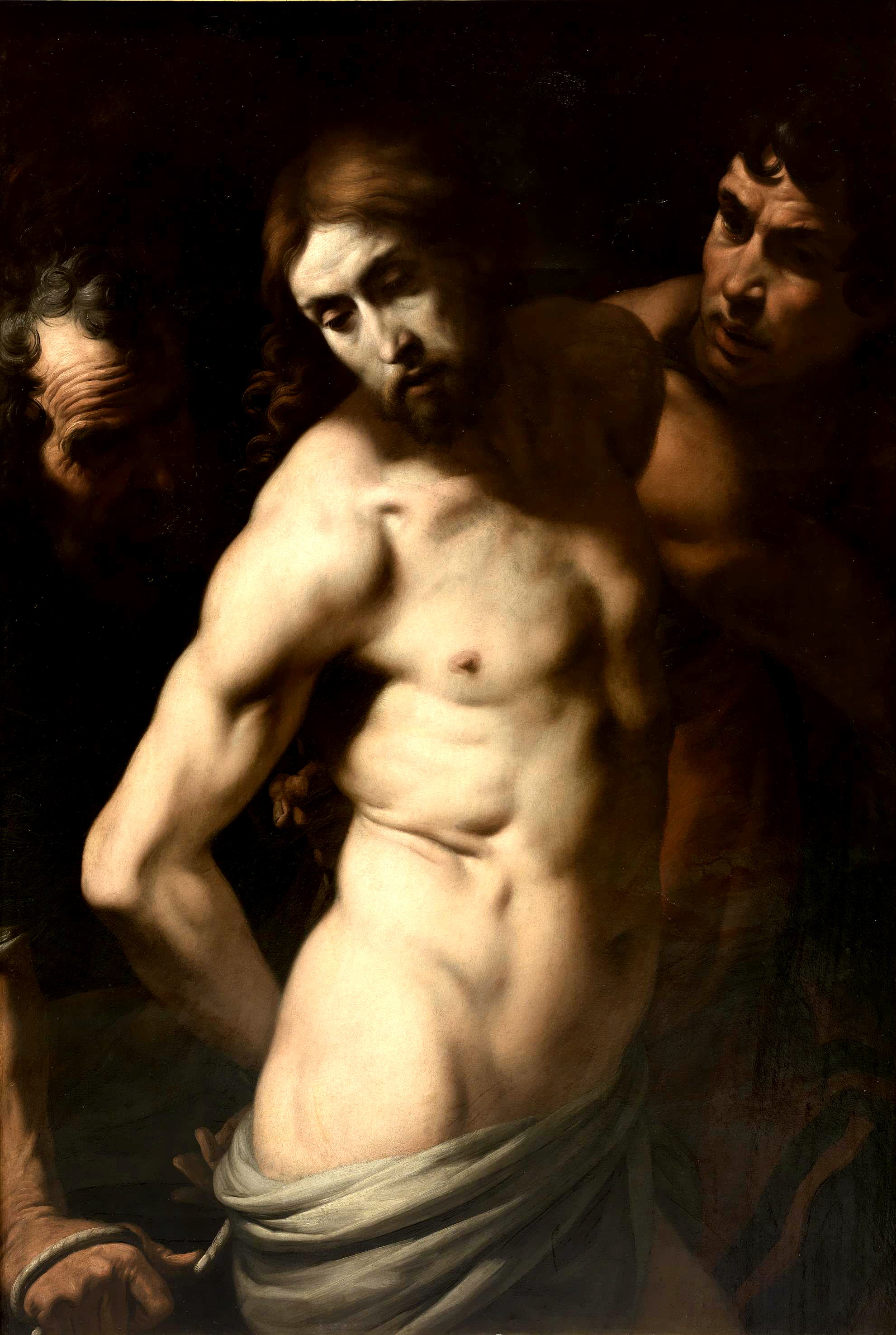
The Flagellation of Christ, c. 1625, Museo del Prado, Madrid

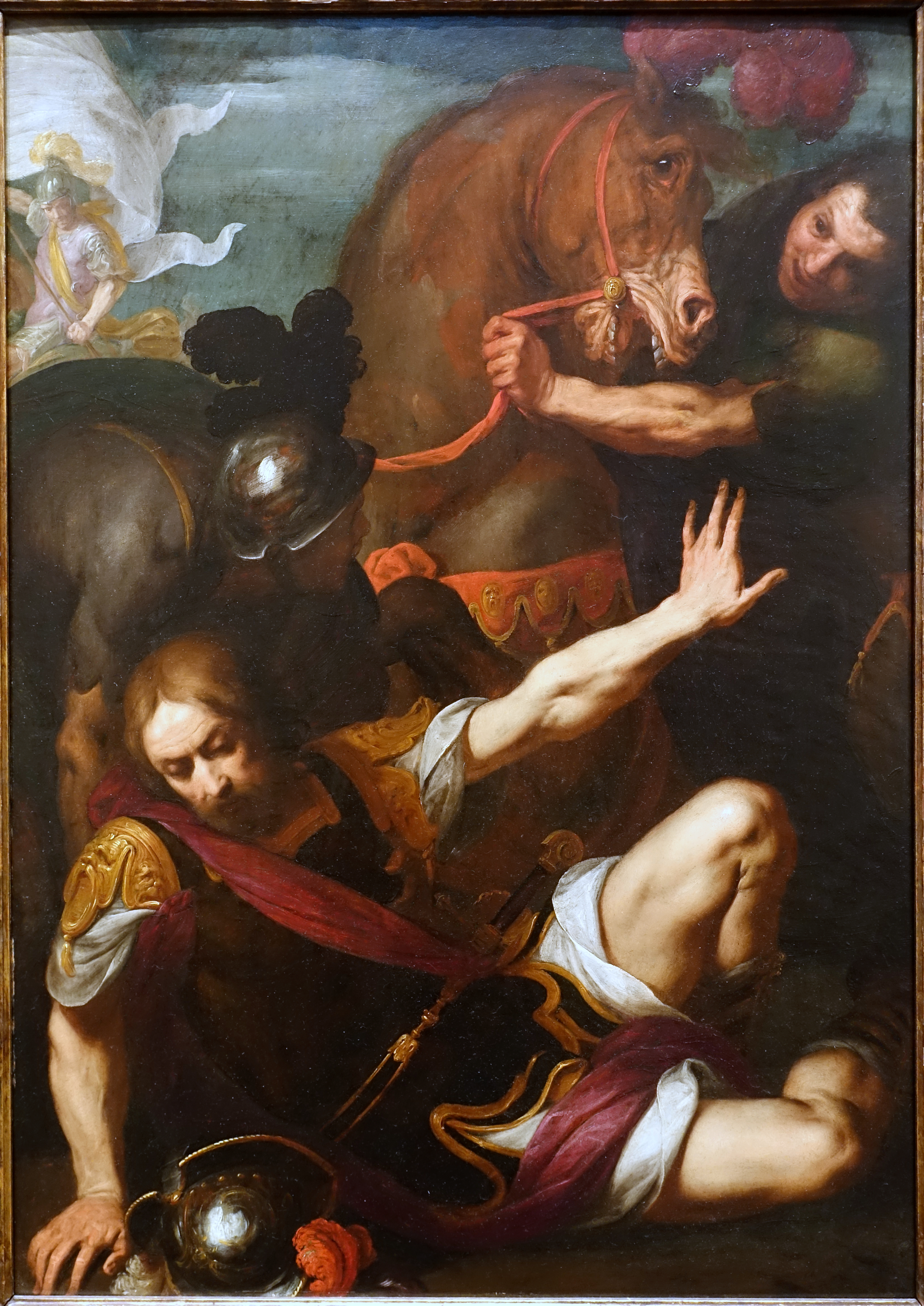
The Conversion of Saint Paul, c. 1621, Blanton Museum of Art, Austin, Texas

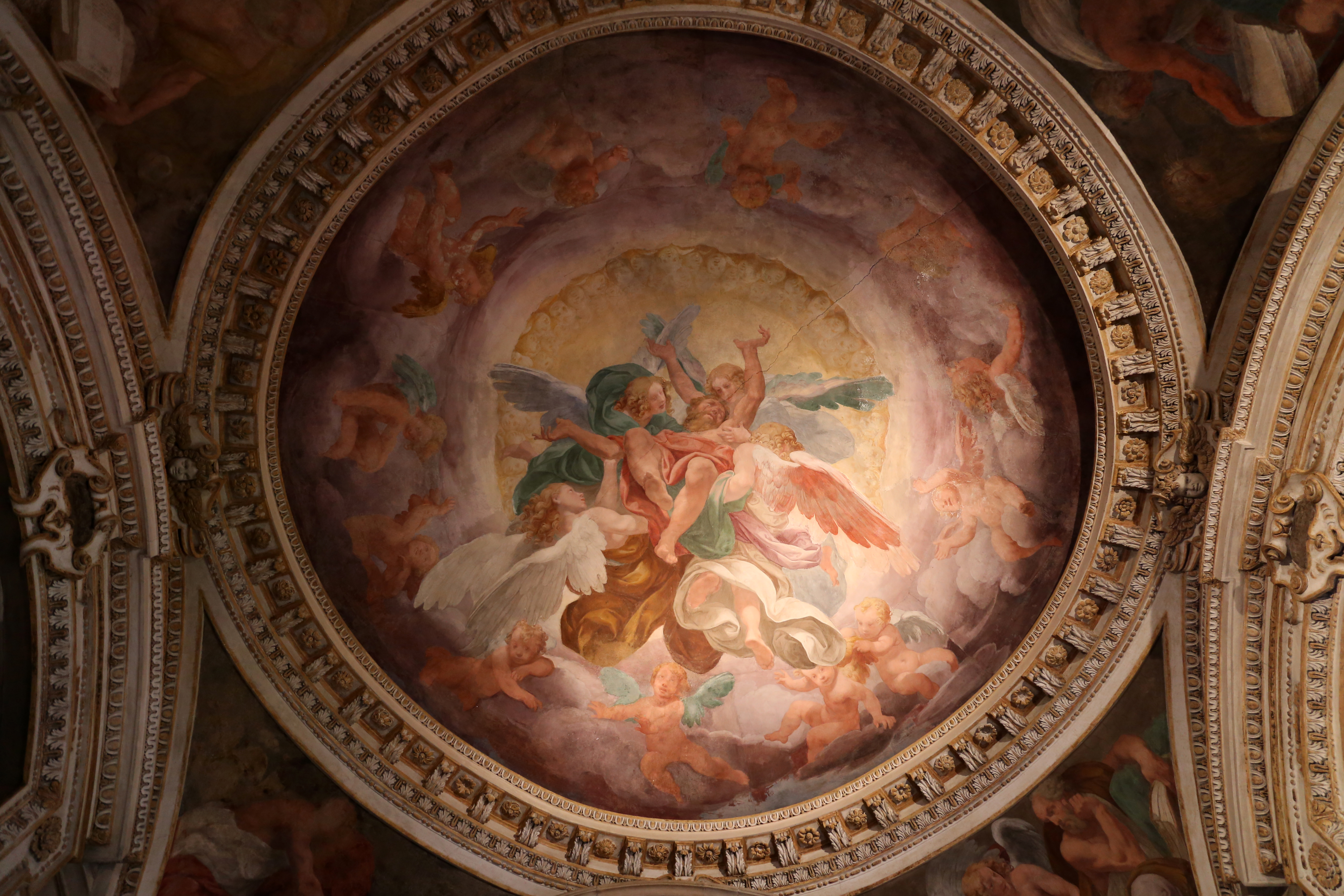
Frescoes on the cupola of Sacchi Chapel in Sant'Eustorgio, Milan

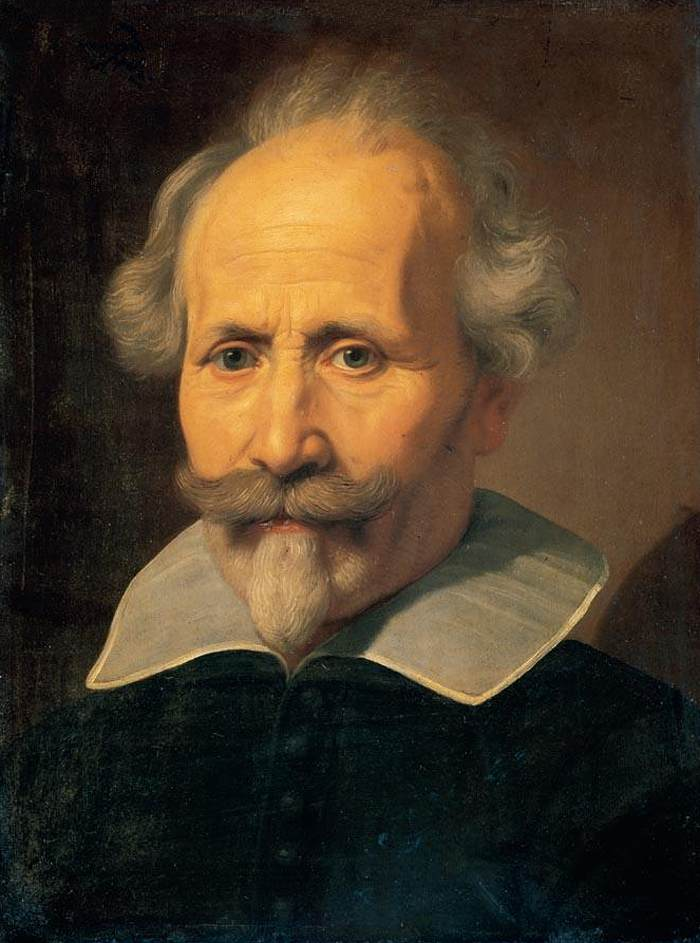
Portrait of a Gentleman, c. 1625, priv. col.
