= Portrait of the Artist's Family (Sofonisba Anguissola) =

Painting by Sofonisba Anguissola

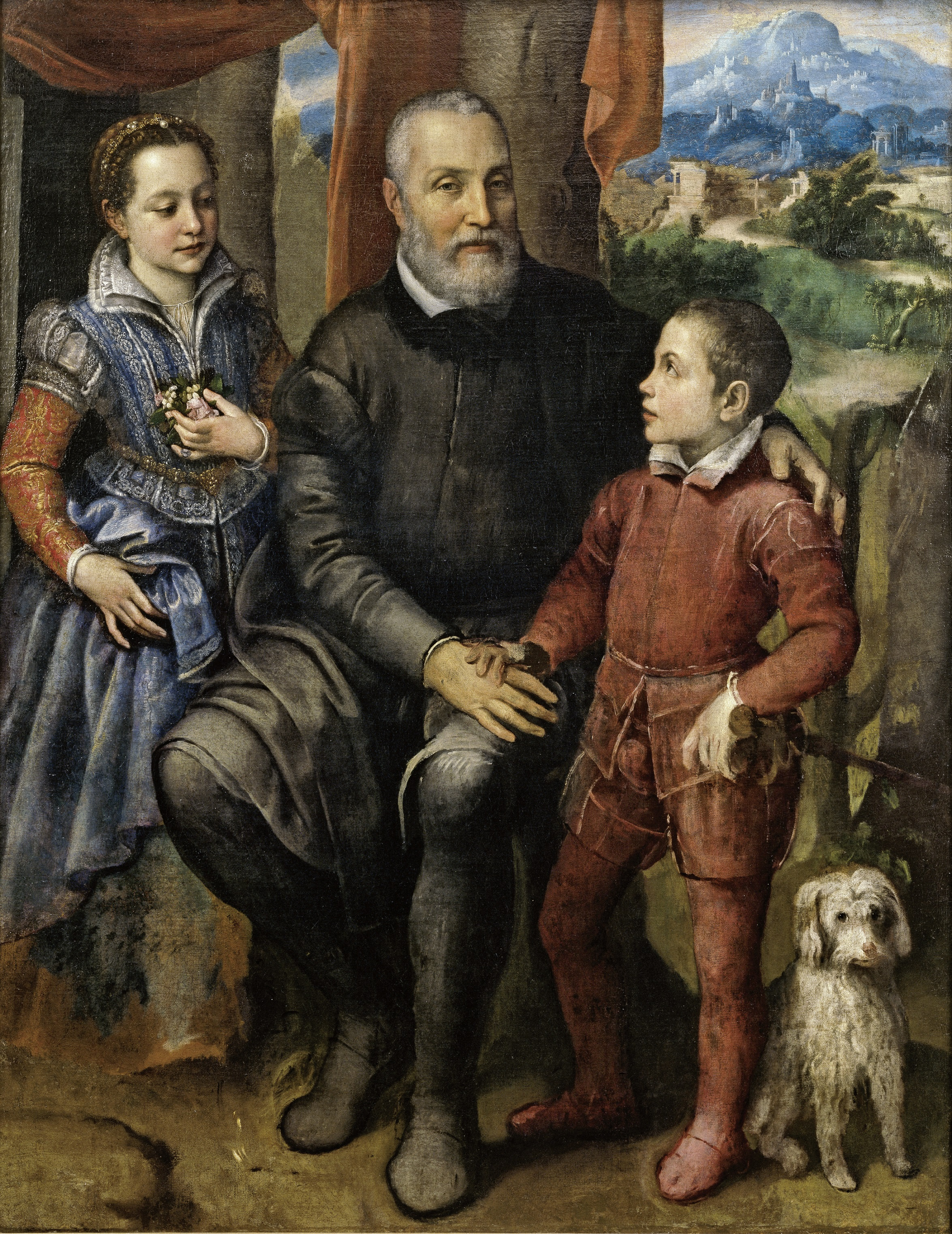
- Artist: Sofonisba Anguissola
- Year: 1558-1559
- Medium: oil paint, canvas
- Dimensions: 157 cm (62 in) × 122 cm (48 in)
- Location: Denmark
- Owner: Johannes Hage, Wilhelm Marstrand
- Identifiers: Bildindex der Kunst und Architektur ID: 20284064

Portrait of the Artist's Family is a 1558–59 oil-on-canvas painting by the Italian artist Sofonisba Anguissola in the Nivaagaard art gallery, in Copenhagen.

This painting shows the artist's family in a landscape and portrays her father Amilcare, sister Minerva, and brother Asdrubale with their pet dog. The picture is considered unfinished, and it is supposed that she left it in its unfinished state to obey a summons by King Philip II of Spain, where she became court painter for 20 years. This is the only known portrait of her father, but Sofonisba had painted Minerva a few years before when she made a picture of her sisters playing chess.

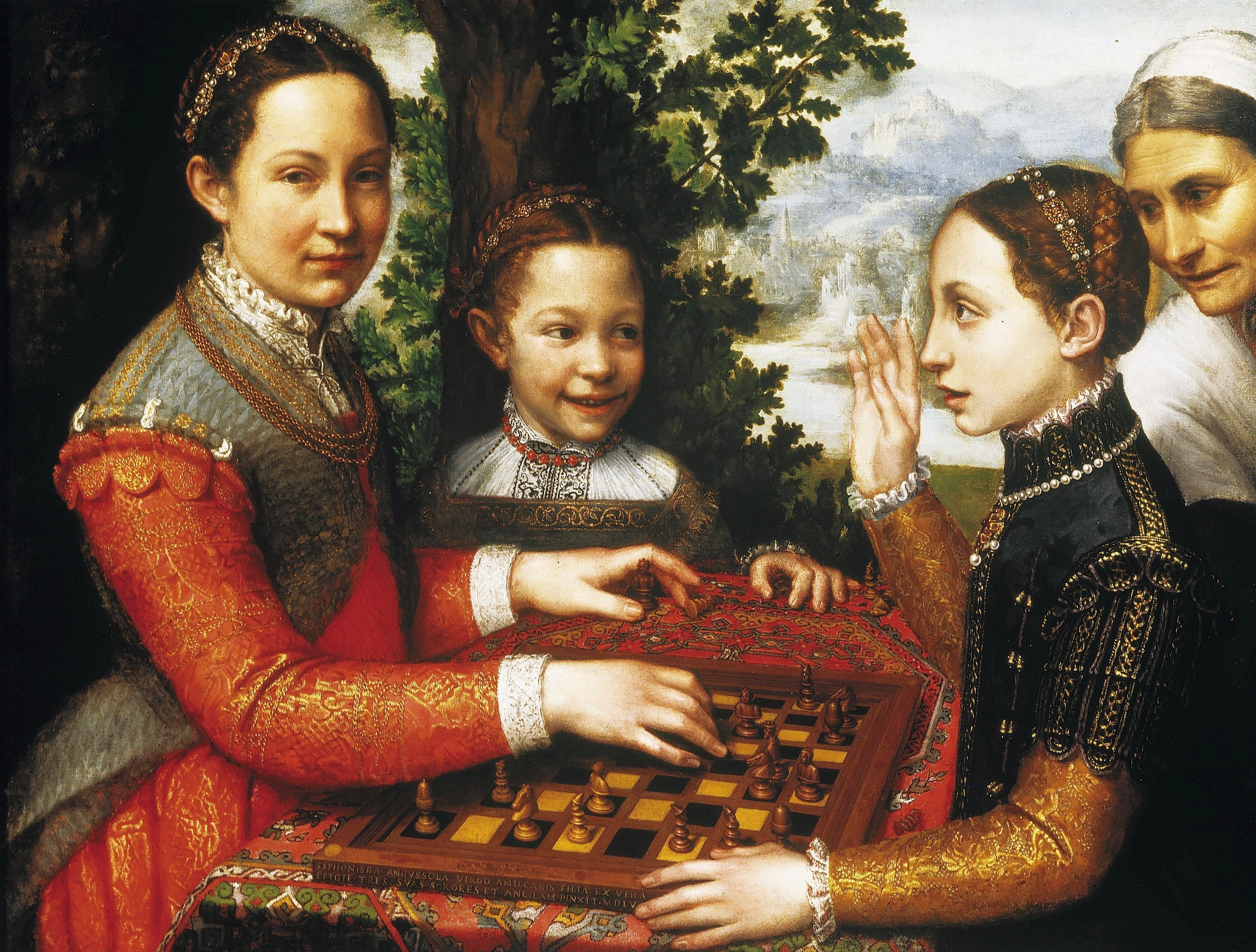
Portrait of the Artist's Sisters Playing Chess, showing from left to right: Lucia, Europa, and Minerva, 1555

This painting was purchased by the museum founder Johannes Hage at the estate auction of the Danish painter Wilhelm Marstrand along with a painting by that artist in 1873. It is considered one of the most important works by the artist from her early period.

== See also ==
- List of paintings by Sofonisba Anguissola
