= Portrait of the Artist's Family =

Portrait of the Artist's Family may refer to:

- Portrait of the Artist's Family (Holbein)
- Portrait of the Artist's Family (Sofonisba Anguissola)

== See also ==
- Portrait of the Artist with his Family by Jacob Jordaens
- Portrait of the Artist's Mother (disambiguation)
