= Obelisk for the 13 Victims of 14 April 1860, Palermo =

Honorary monument

Coordinates: 38.12236°N 13.36465°E

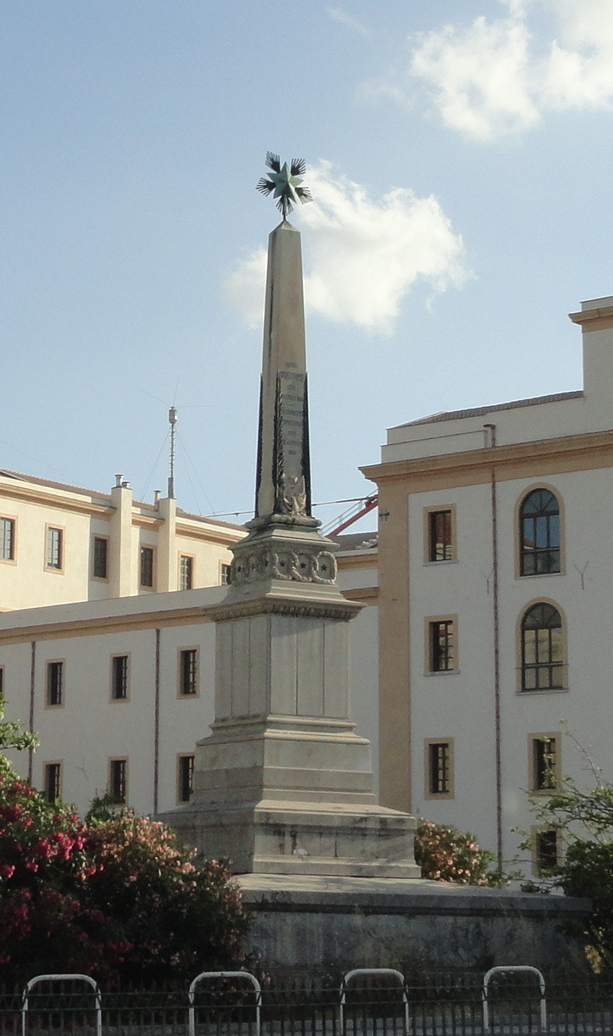
The obelisk in Piazza delle XIII Vittime

The Obelisk for the 13 Victims of 14 April 1860 (Obelisco Alle Tredici Vittime Del 14 Aprile 1860) is a monument honoring the thirteen prisoners executed, without trial, for conspiring to lead a revolt against the Bourbon monarchy. It is located in a park, the Piazza delle XIII Vittime, at the intersection of Via Cavour and Via Francesco Crispi, just north of the church of San Giorgio dei Genovesi in the ancient quarter of Castellammare of Palermo, region of Sicily, Italy.

The failed plot which led to the execution of the 13 men is known as the Gancia Revolt, after the church and convent of Santa Maria della Gancia. With the aid of some of the Franciscans, some thirty conspirators had hidden themselves and weapons in the Gancia convent, but were betrayed to the police by one of the friars, Michele da Sant’Antonino. The head of police, Salvatore Maniscalco, gathered a regiment an on 4 April 1860 stormed the convent killing nearly twenty and capturing thirteen rebels. Two were able to escape by hiding amid corpses in the crypt tombs, and later tunneling out through a small perforation in the wall (bucca della salvezza) still marked on Via Allora. Further color is added to the events, because the rebels were able to escape due to a distraction staged by neighborhood prostitutes to distract the soldiers of the Bourbon monarchy.

The thirteen arrested were detained at the castle of Castellamare. The authorities fearing further revolts and the invasion by Garibaldi and his army, decided to publicly execute the prisoners, forgoing any trial. The thirteen were blindfolded and led to a bastion at Porta San Giorgio. They were forced to kneel and a dozen were executed by two volleys. A lone survivor, a local butcher named Sebastiano Camarrone, rather than having his execution commuted, was killed by a third volley. The bodies were buried hurriedly in an unmarked grave in a local cemetery. A month later, the Expedition of the Thousand by Garibaldi liberated Palermo from Bourbon rule.

The monument was designed by Salvatore Valenti and erected in 1883. Atop the obelisk is a metal star. At the base are engraved the names of the victims: Michelangelo Barone (age 30 years), Gaetano Calandra (34), Sebastiano Camarrone (30), Cono Cangeri (34), Andrea Coffaro (60), Domenico Cucinotta (31), Nicolò Di Lorenzo (32), Giovanni Riso (58), Liborio Vallone (44), Pietro Vassallo (40), Francesco Ventimiglia (27), Michele Fanara (22), and Giuseppe Teresi (28 years old). The son of Giovanni Riso, also apprehended, would die of wounds and torture a month later.

The site is poorly conserved. In the park across the street are rusted monolithic beams meant to be Monument to the Fallen in the Battle against the Mafia.
