= San Giorgio dei Genovesi, Palermo =

Church in Palermo, Italy

Church of Saint George of the Genoese
- Chiesa di San Giorgio dei Genovesi (in Italian)
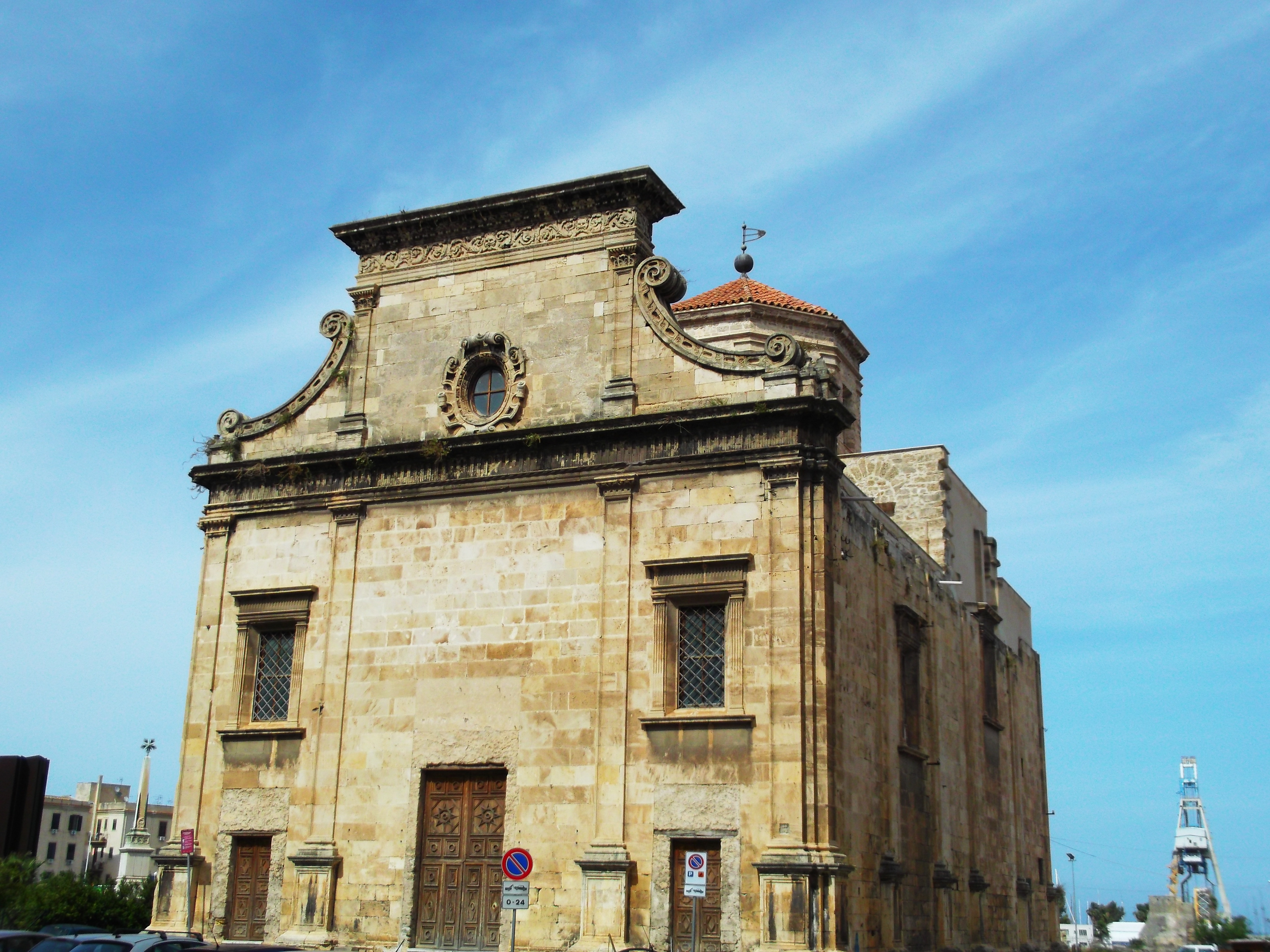
- Façade of the church

Religion
- Affiliation: Roman Catholic
- Province: Archdiocese of Palermo
- Rite: Roman Rite

Location
- Location: Palermo, Italy
- Interactive map of Church of Saint George of the Genoese
- Coordinates: 38°07′18.56″N 13°21′52.47″E

Architecture
- Architect: Giorgio Di Faccio
- Style: Renaissance
- Groundbreaking: 1576
- Completed: 1596

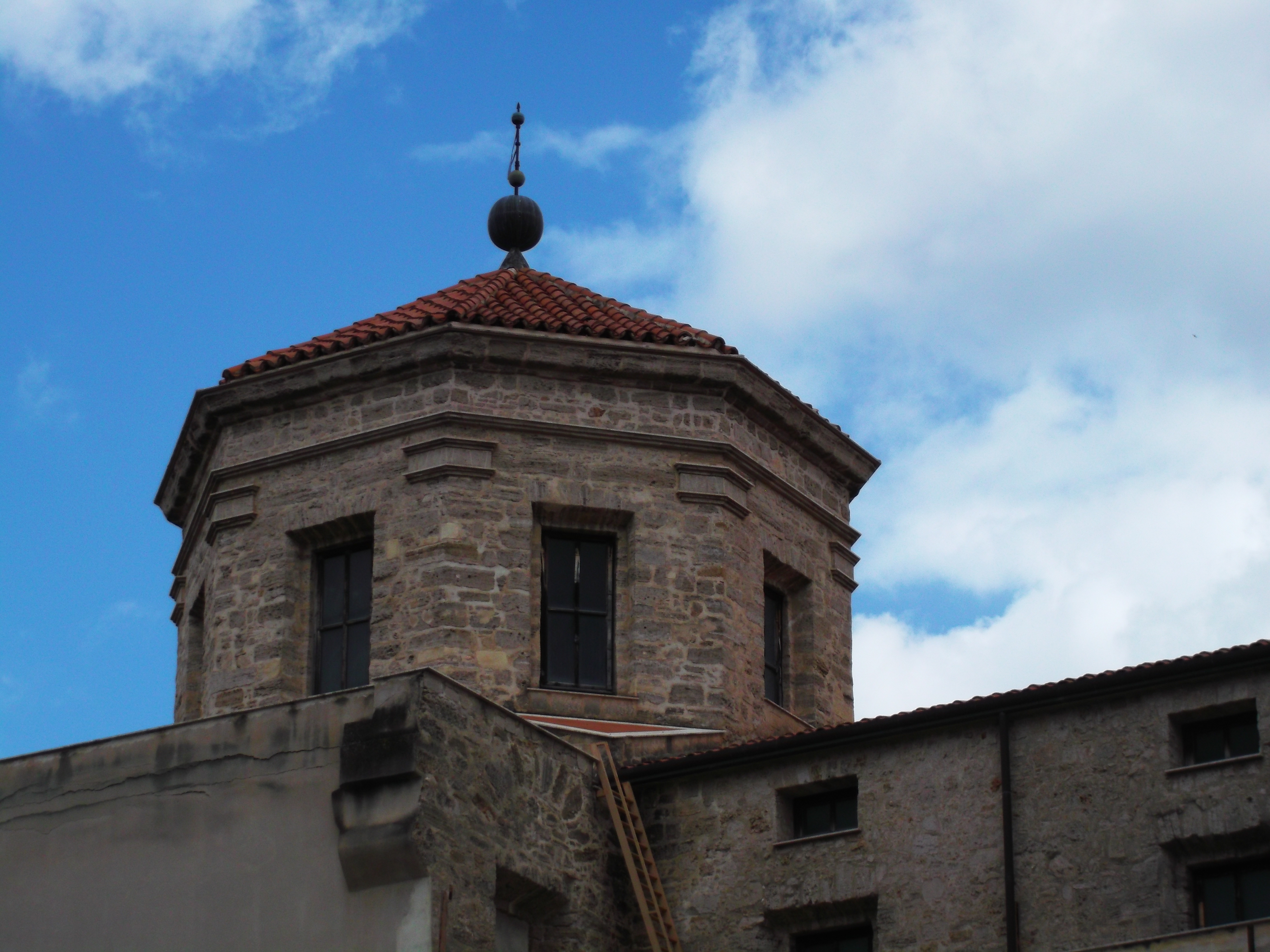
The dome

Saint George of the Genoese (Italian: San Giorgio dei Genovesi) is a Renaissance-style, Roman Catholic church located near the port of La Cala, on Via Buon Pastore in the ancient quarter of the Loggia, in Palermo, region of Sicily, Italy.

== History ==
Before the construction of this church the Genoese community of Palermo celebrated its religious services in a chapel located in the complex of San Francesco d'Assisi. In 1576 the Genoese bought the little church of San Luca and the surrounding land, located near the port. They demolished the old church and planned the construction of a new temple dedicated to their patron, Saint George.

The architectural project was produced by Giorgio Di Faccio with the assistance of Battista Carabbio. The construction of the church was the result of the new financial balance of power of the city. In fact, the Genoeses overtook the Pisans in the context of banking in the Kingdom of Sicily. Many rich Genoese families contributed to the construction. The church was completed in 1596.

The church hosts the burial of the famous female painter Sofonisba Anguissola.

The church now lies at the edge of the urban settlement, cornered by the interstate highway and Via Cavour. To the north are is the dilapidated monument to the Obelisk for the 13 Victims dedicated to the revolutionaries shot near here by Bourbon authorities a month prior to the liberation by Garibaldi.

== Art ==
=== Paintings ===
Oil on canvas:

- Annunciation, Luca Giordano
- Our Lady of the Rosary and Saints, Luca Giordano
- Baptism of Jesus, Palma il Giovane
- Martyrdom of Saint George, Palma il Giovane
- Ecstasy of Saint Francis of Assisi, Gerardo Astorino
- Stoning of Saint Stephen the Protomartyr, Bernardo Castello
- Martyrdom of Saint Vincent of Saragossa, Jacopo da Empoli
- Our Lady Queen of Genoa, Domenico Fiasella
- Saint Luke depicting the Virgin, Filippo Paladini
- Saint George and the Dragon, unknown author

== See also ==
- Loggia
- La Cala
- 16th-century Western domes
