= Portrait of the Artist's Mother =

Portrait of the Artist's Mother may refer to:

- Portrait of the Artist's Mother (Van Gogh)
- Portrait of the Artist's Mother at the Age of 63, by Albrecht Dürer

== See also ==
- Whistler's Mother
- Portrait of the Artist's Family (disambiguation)
