= Santa Maria della Gancia, Palermo =

Roman Catholic church in Palermo, Italy

Coordinates: 38.1164°N 13.3706°E

Santa Maria della Gancia, also known as Santa Maria degli Angeli, is a 15th-century Roman Catholic church, adjacent to a convent, located on Via Alloro #27 in central Palermo, region of Sicily, Italy.

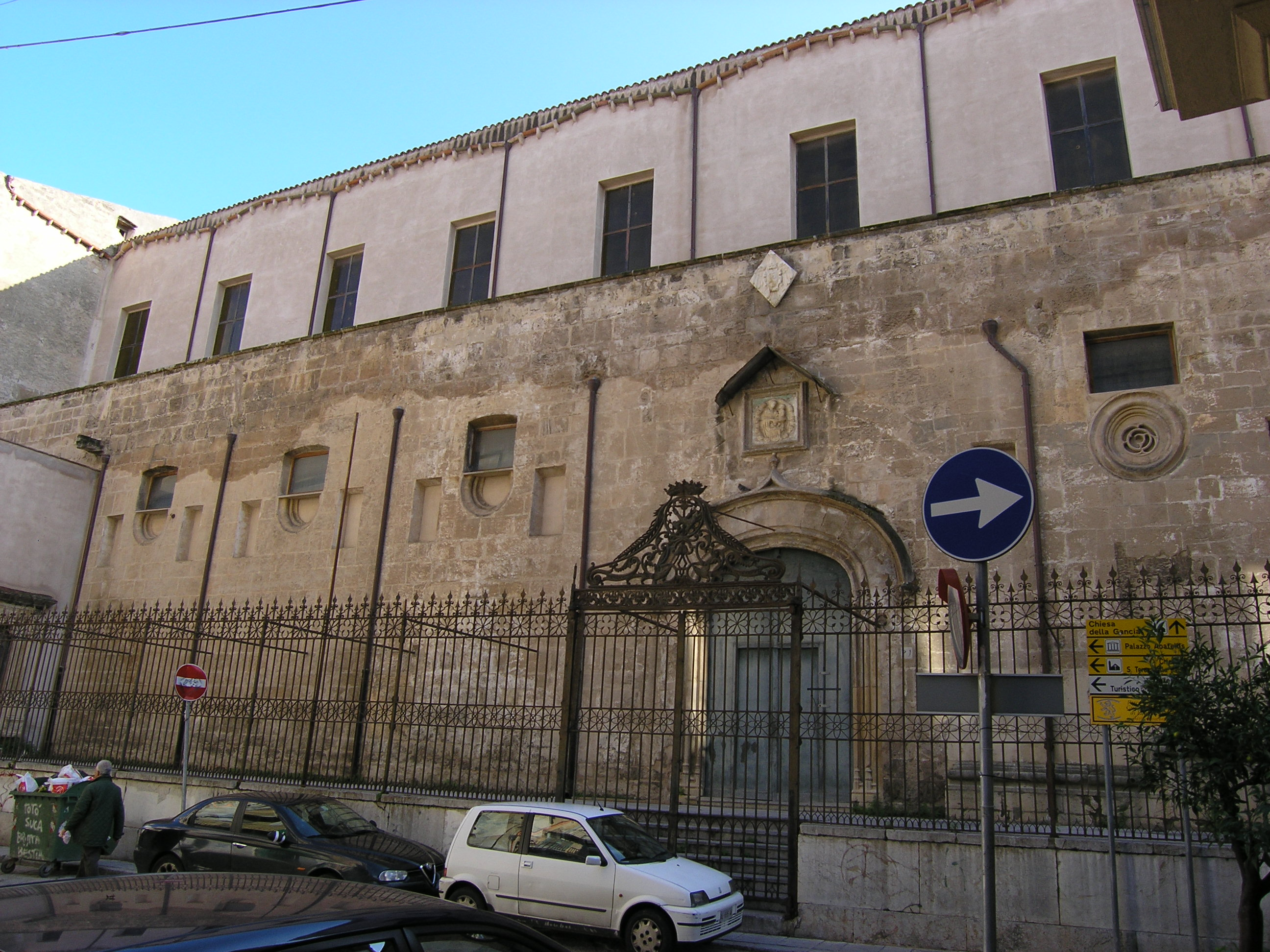
(Cummentu di la Gancia) Convent of La Gancia)

== History ==
The name La Gancia derives from an icon of the Child Jesus that was venerated here, supposedly fished from the sea by a monk from the adjacent Convent of the Gancia, which served as a hostel for pilgrims.

The church was commissioned by the Franciscan order beginning in 1490 atop an older church dedicated to St Jerome. The church facade is a hybrid of late Spanish Gothic portal and plain awkward Renaissance windows.

The interior was decorated in the Baroque style. Some of the chapels contain stucco work by Serpotta and a main altarpiece of the Holy Family by Pietro Novelli (he also has works in the 3rd chapel on the left. The second chapel on the right has a painting depicting the Madonna and Saints Catherine and Agata (1528) by Antonello da Palermo. The pilasters of the Presbytery have the Virgin and St Gabriel by Antonello Gagini, who also has works in the 6th chapel on the left. The second chapel on the left has a Nativity by Vincenzo da Pavia.

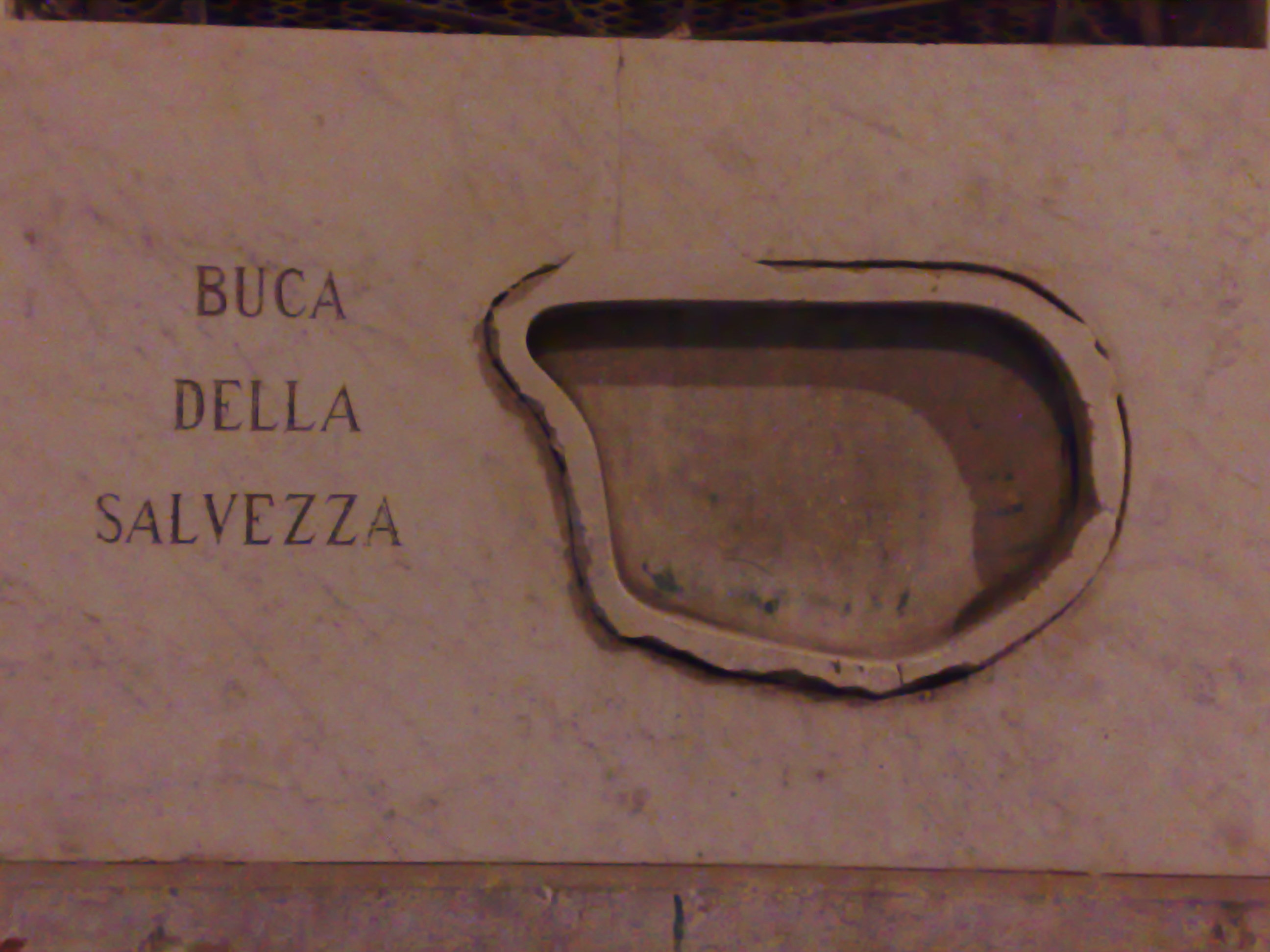
buca della salvezza

== Gancia Revolt of 1860 ==
The church gave the name, Gancia Revolt (Rivolta della Gancia), to a failed 1860 plot against the Bourbon Government. With the aid of some of the Franciscans, some thirty conspirators had hidden themselves in the convent, but were betrayed to the police by one of the friors. On April 4, 1860, troops stormed the convent killing nearly twenty. Thirteen were arrested, but later executed without trial. Two were able to escape by hiding amid corpses in the crypt tombs, and later tunneling out through a small perforation in the wall (buca della salvezza) still marked on Via Allora. A month later, the Expedition of the Thousand by Garibaldi liberated Palermo from Bourbon rule. The 13 men executed were honored with an Obelisk erected at the Piazza delle XIII Vittime at the intersection of Via Cavour and Via Francesco Crispi.
