= Johannes Hage =

Danish businessman

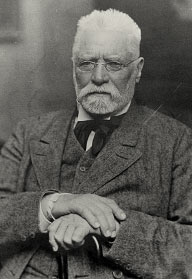
- Born: 28 May 1842
- Died: 14 January 1923 (aged 80)

Johannes Hage (1842–1923) was a Danish businessman who became a philanthropist and later founder of the Nivaagaard museum.

He was the son of a brickworks director whose estate and complex at Nivaagaard he inherited in 1872. Under his direction the company prospered by supplying bricks to building projects in Copenhagen. With his wealth Hage subsidized the National Museum (Statens Museum for Kunst), but in 1908 decided to found his own art gallery, the Nivaagaards Malerisamling, with 150 paintings. He opened it to the public and in 1908 he made up a will in which he bequeathed the entire collection to the state, along with the museum building and a capital of 60,000 Danish marks for maintenance. In 1913 the later director and curator of the National Museum, Karl Madsen, wrote a catalog of his collection.
