= Nivaagaard =

Historic building in Copenhagen, Denmark

Coordinates: 55.9276°N 12.5123°E

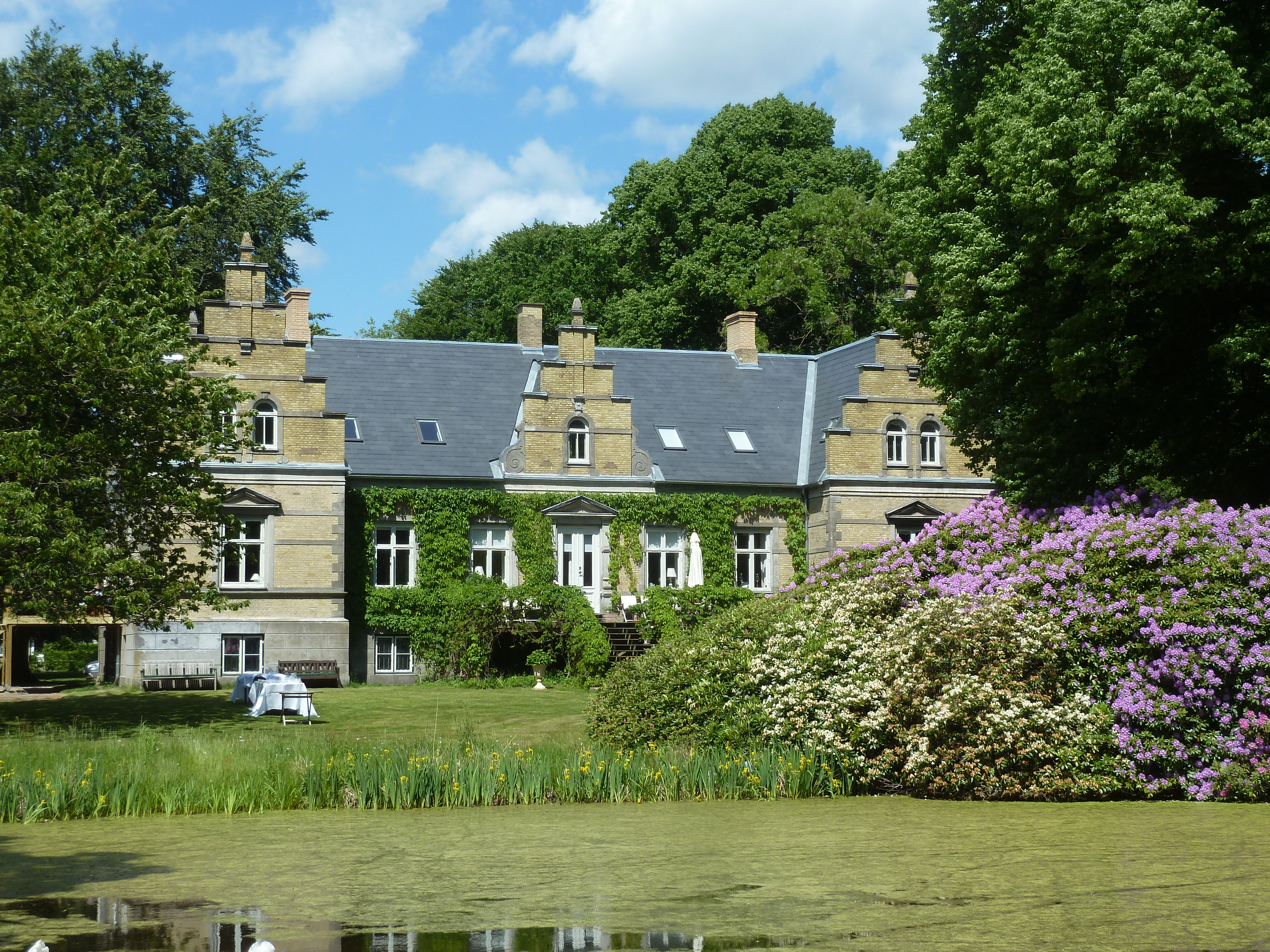
The old main building

Nivaagaard is a historic property in Nivå in the northern outskirts of Copenhagen, Denmark. It is now home to an art gallery and the park is open to the public.

== History ==
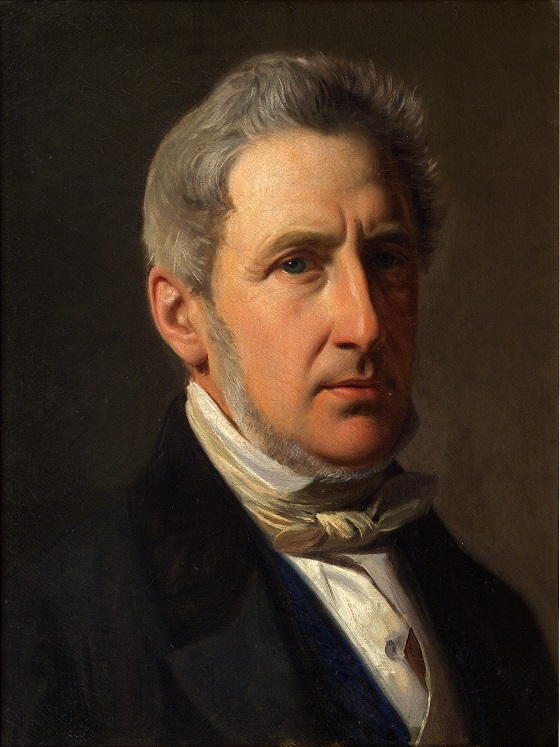
Alfred Hage painted by Constantin Hansen in c. 1854

The estate was founded in 1767 by Adam von Lüttichau when he purchased Nivaa Havnegård ("Nivaa Harbour House") from the Crown. The property was from the beginning associated with the Galley Harbour at Nivaa which was planned in 1753 but soon abandoned. The name Nivaagaard was introduced in 1793.

The estate was acquired by Alfred Hage in 1862. Alfred Hage's eldest son, Johannes Hage, inherited the estate in 1872. The main building was severely damaged in a fire in 1873. A new main building was completed to design by Ferdinand Vilhelm Jensen in 1881. Nivaagaard was a dominating factor in Nivaa's development over the next decades.

== Nivaagaard Brickyard ==
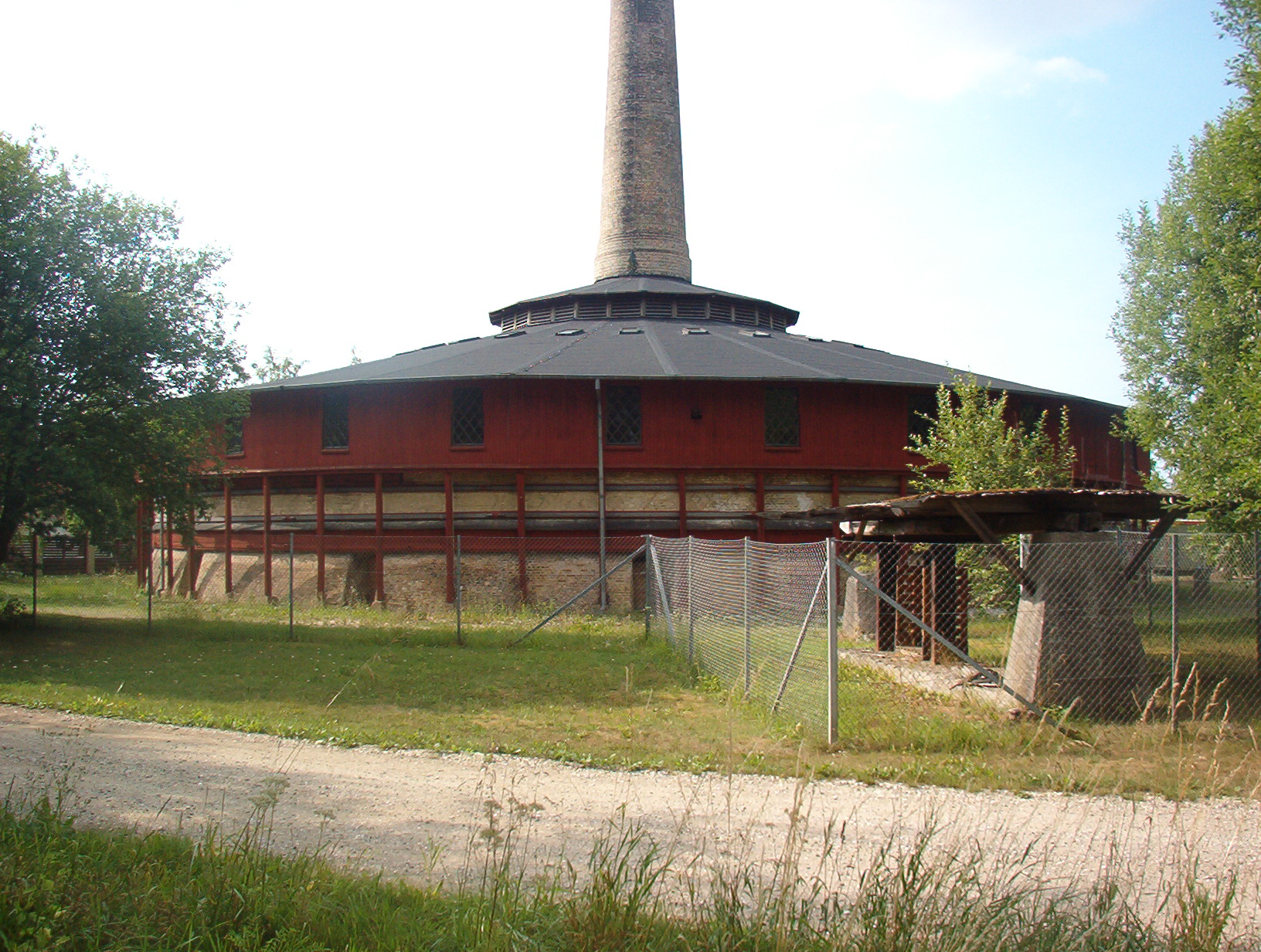
The ring oven

The first brickyard on the estate was established by Queen Louise in 1701. By 1720 it produced brick for the royal buildings in Copenhagen and the northern part of Zealand.

These activities increased and were modernized in the 1840s. In 1857 the brickyard was one of the first in Denmark to introduce a steam engine in the production chain.

In 1870, eight years after Alfred Hage had acquired the estate, a circular fire house was constructed, based on plans by Friedrich Hoffmann. The oven remained in use for 97 years up until 1967. The brickyard closed in 1980 and then re-opened as a museum. The ring oven, which is now listed, is the earliest of Hoffmann's designs which still exist today.

== Art collection ==
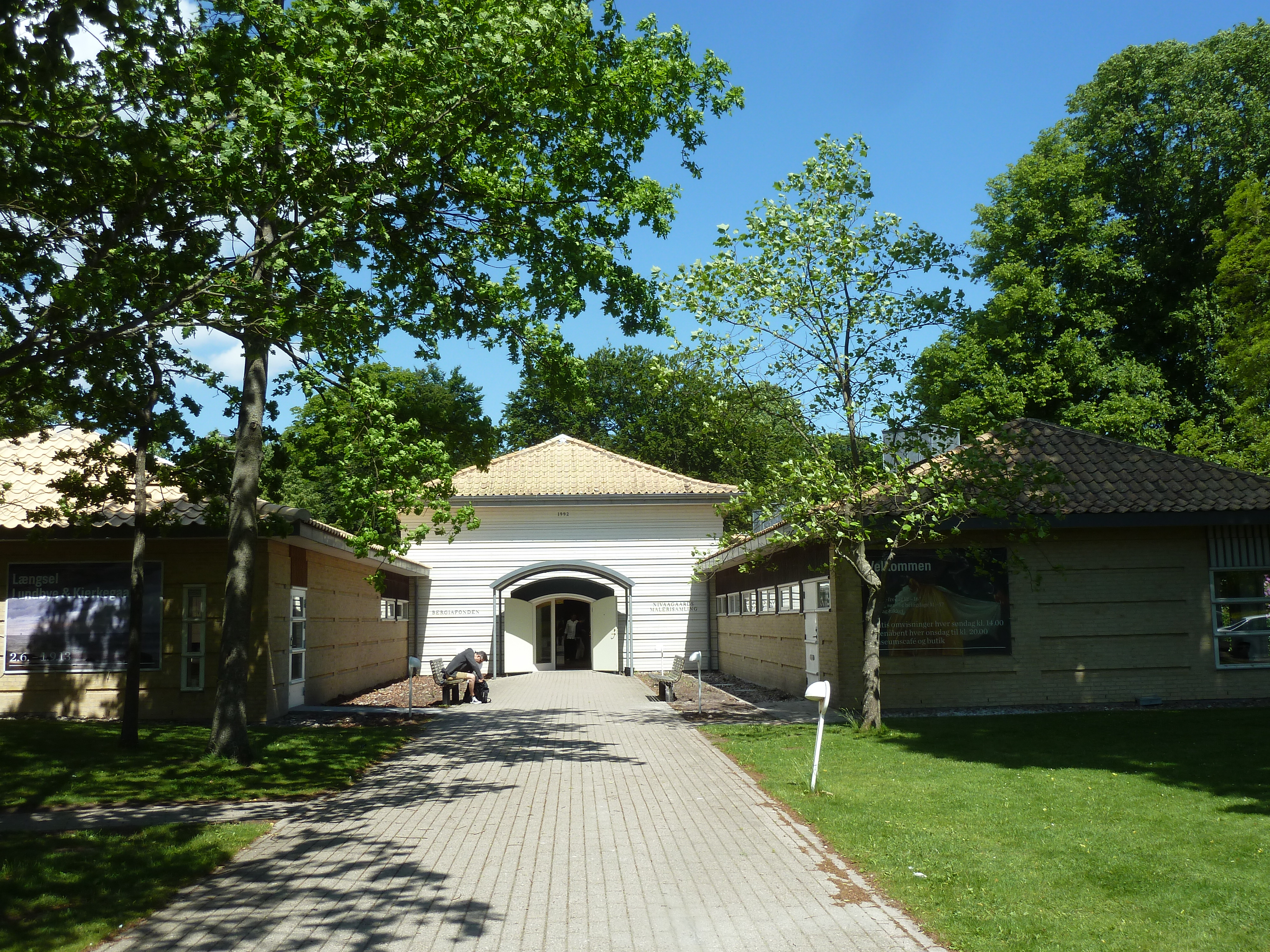
The northern wing of the museum

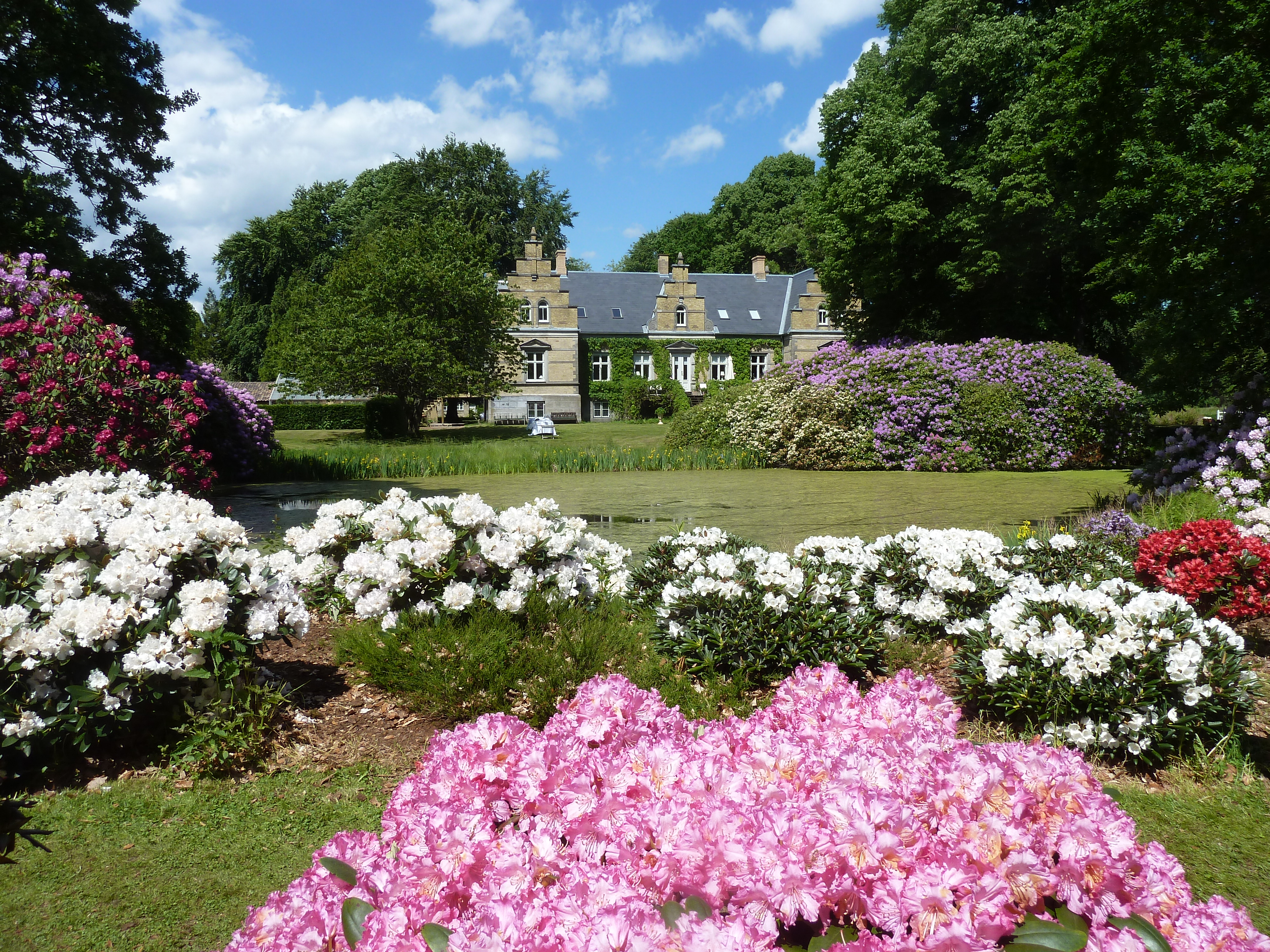
Flowering rhododendrons in the park

The art collection was founded by Johannes Hage between 1895 and 1905. It covered European Renaissance and Baroque painting and Danish Golden Age art. A small museum building in temple style designed by Johan Schrøder was built near the main house in 1903. On 30 September 1908 Hage turned his collection into a self-owning institution which made it available to the public. He chaired the board until his death in 1923.

The management of the museum was professionalized in 1981 and it arranged its first special exhibition in 1983. In 1988 the museum building was expanded with support from the Velux Foundation and the Knud Højgaard Foundation. The new wing was designed by royal building inspector David Bretton-Meyer.

The European collection contains works by Giovanni Bellini, Claude Lorrain and Rembrandt. The Danish collection contains works by some of the leading artists of the Danish Golden Age, including C.W. Eckersberg, Christen Købke, Johan Lundbye, Wilhelm Marstrand, Martinus Rørbye and P. C. Skovgaard.

== Park ==
The original park was designed by Edvard Glæsel and laid out in 1901–02. A large rhododendron garden was established in 2007.

== List of owners ==
- (1753–1767) The Crown
- (1767–1793) The Crown / Adam Mogens Holger von Lüttichau
- (1793–1797) Adam Mogens Holger von Lüttichau
- (1797) Georg Christopher Hauch
- (1797–1802) Johan Jørgen Løwe
- (1802–1808) assessor Kræfting
- (1808–1810) Haagen Christian Astrup
- (1810–1812) Brinck-Seidelin
- (1812–1813) Johan Frederik Bardenfleth / R.A.L. von Qualen
- (1813–1831) R.A.L. von Qualen
- (1831–1834) Frederik Burmeister
- (1834–1847) P.M. Hagen
- (1847–1857) V. Engelsted
- (1857–1862) Synnestvedt
- (1862–1872) Alfred Hage
- (1872) Vilhelmine Hage
- (1872–1923) Johannes Hage
- (1923–) Den Hageske Stiftelse

== Image gallery ==
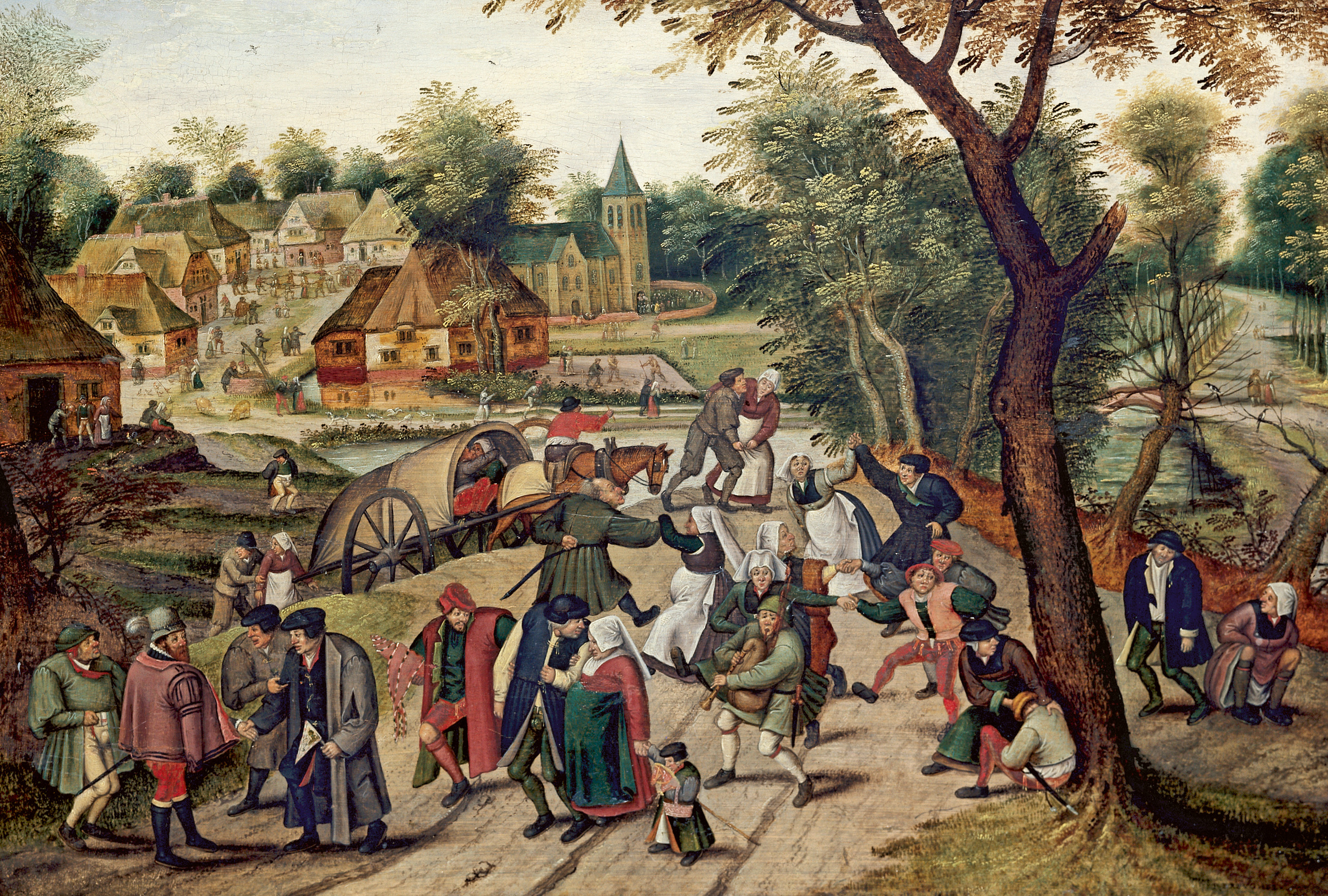
Pieter Brueghel the Younger: The Return from Kermesse c. 1620

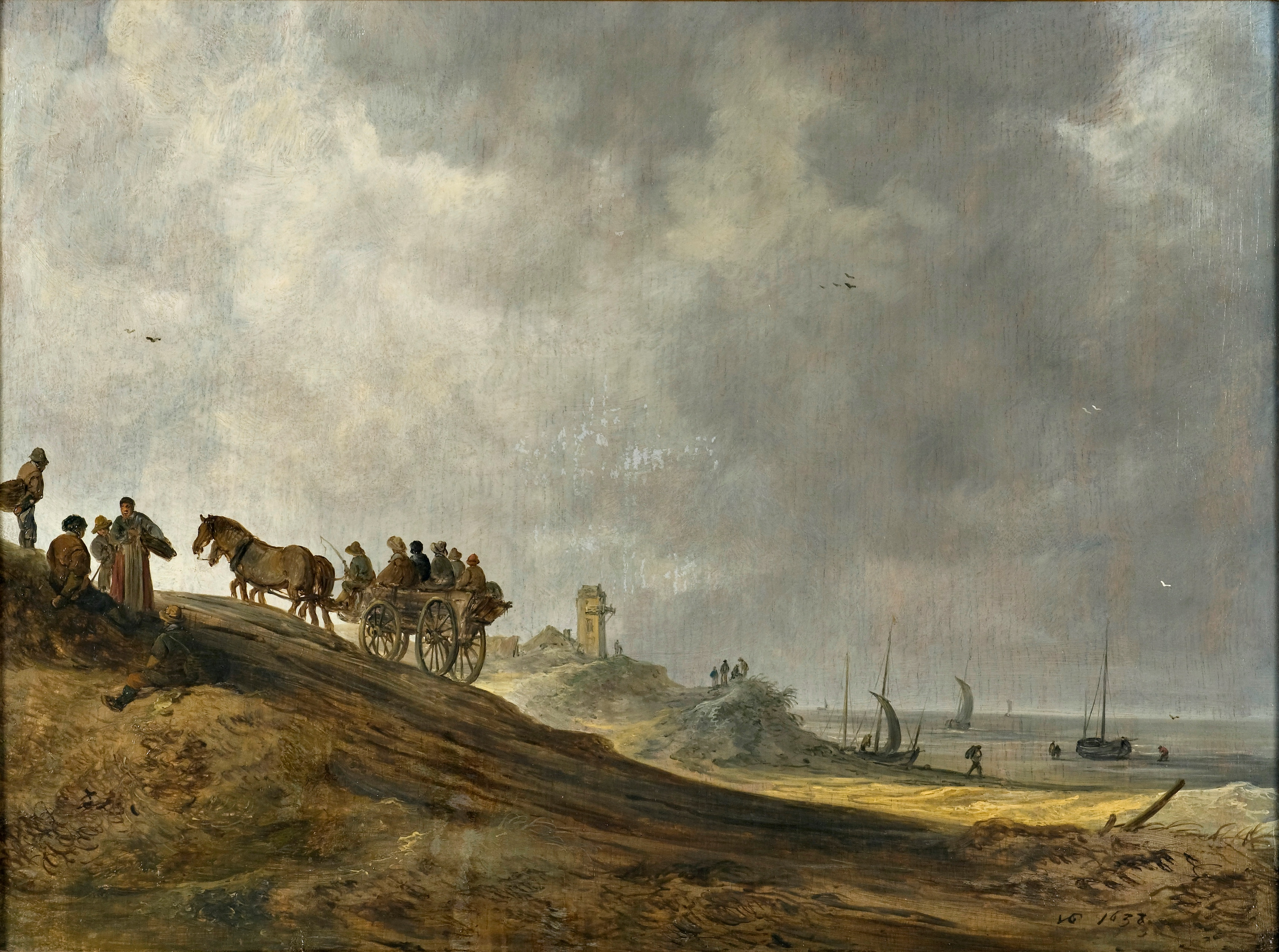
Jan van Goyen: Beach scene, 1638

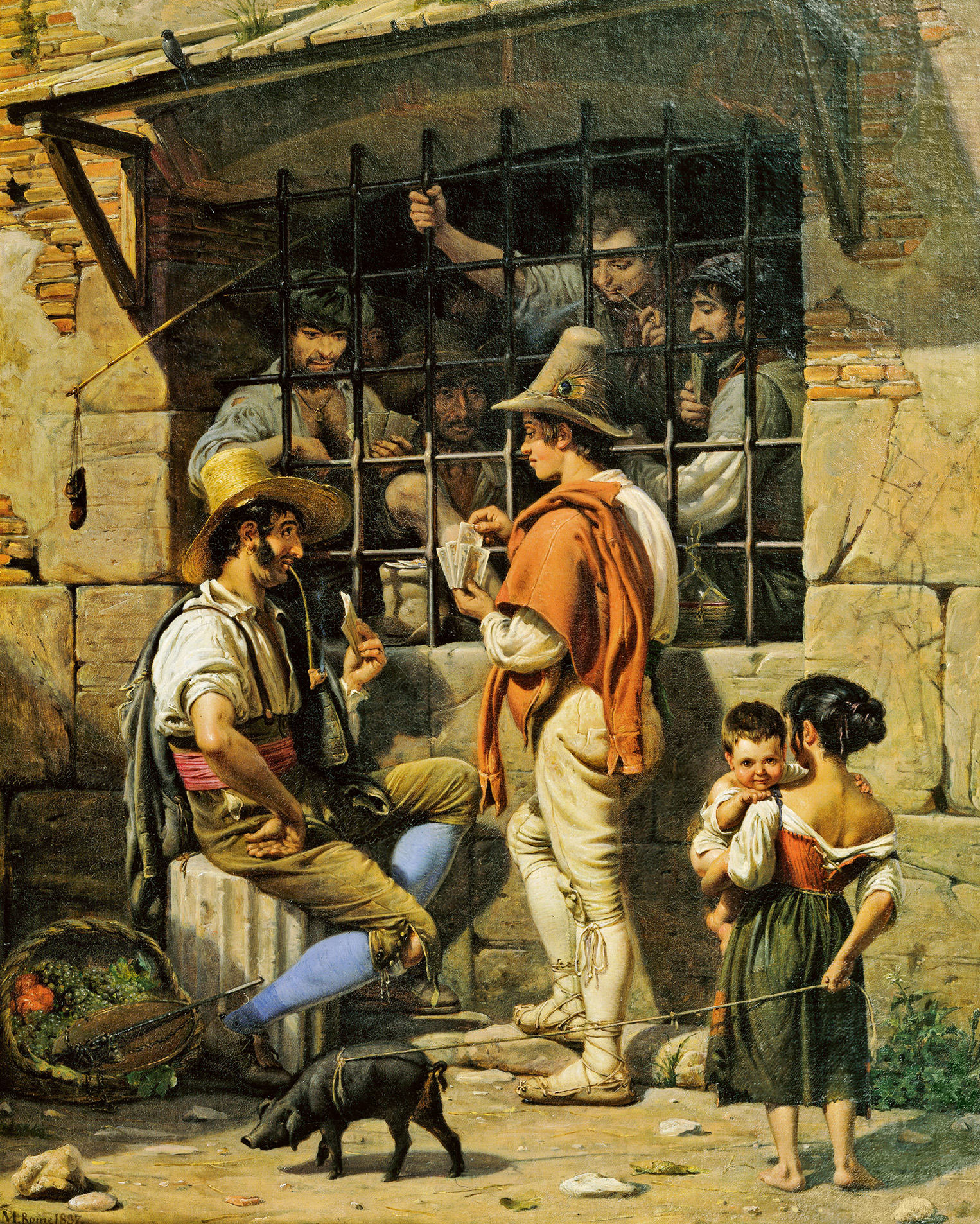
Wilhelm Marstrand: A prison scene in Rome, 1837

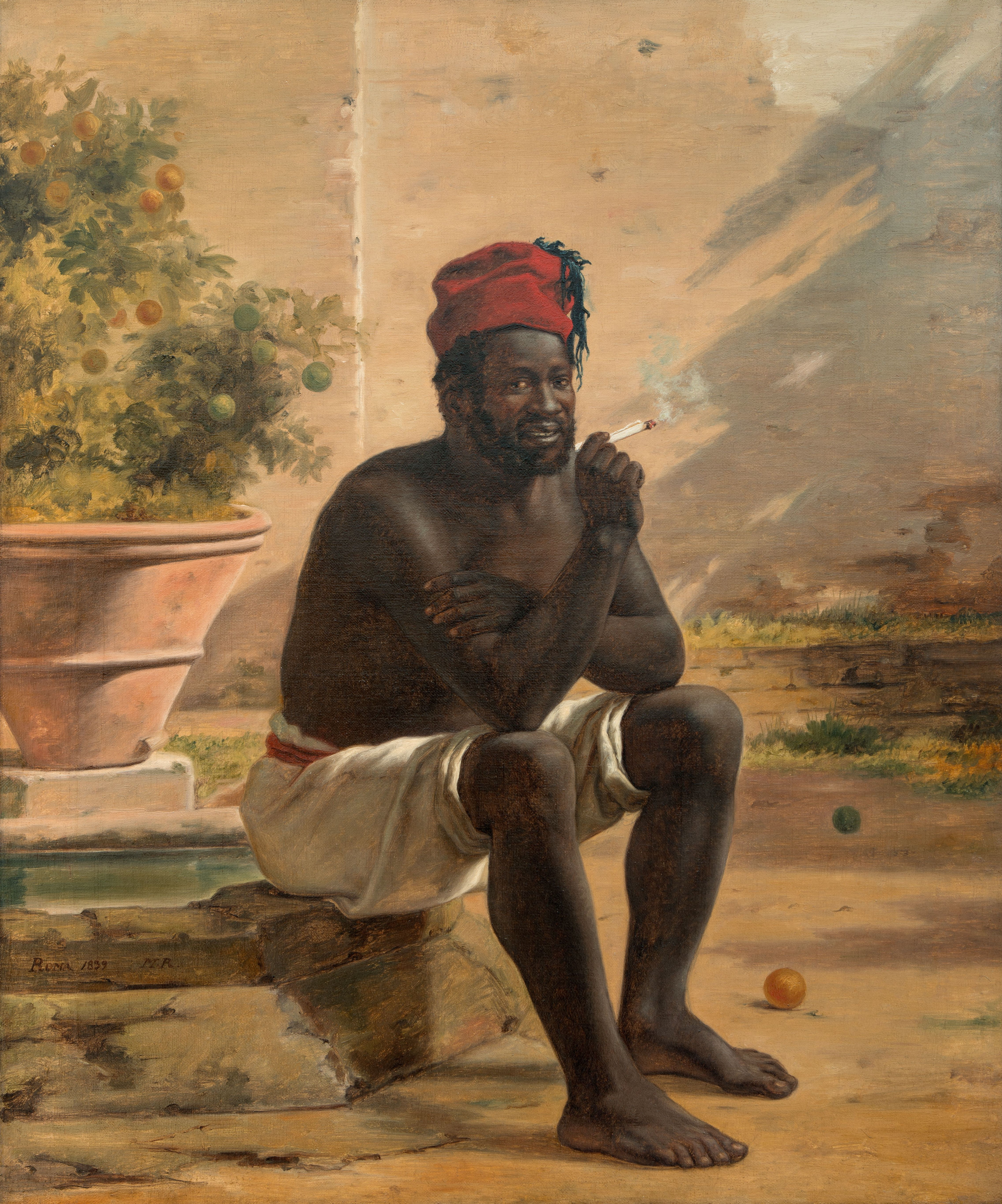
Martinus Rørbye Seated Nubian. Rome 1839
