= Portrait of Bernardino Campi Painting Sofonisba Anguissola =

Oil on canvas double portrait by Anguissola (1550s)

Bernardino Campi Painting Sofonisba Anguissola
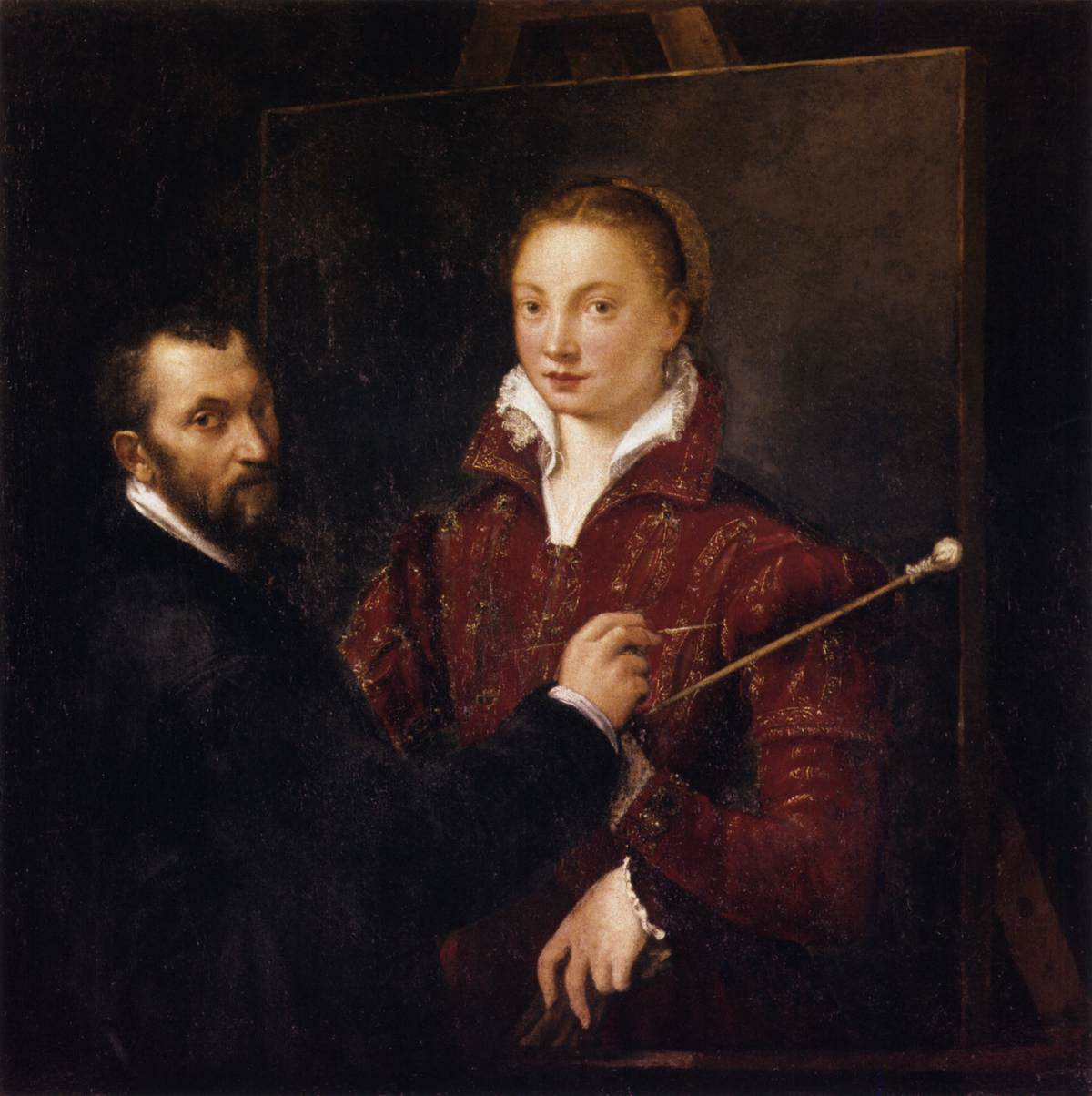
- Artist: Sofonisba Anguissola
- Year: late 1550s
- Medium: oil on canvas
- Location: Pinacoteca Nazionale, Siena

Bernardino Campi Painting Sofonisba Anguissola is an oil on canvas double portrait from the late 1550s by Sofonisba Anguissola, in which she depicts herself being painted by her teacher, Bernadino Campi. Whitney Chadwick has called this "the first historical example of the woman artist consciously collapsing the subject-object position." Mary Garrard has noted that this is an important example of what Giorgio Vasari termed a "breathing likeness."

== Subject matter ==
Bernadino Campi Painting Sofonsiba Anguissola is completed in a similar style to an allegory of painting, a common format for artists self portraits in which they are depicted working at an easel. Where this piece differs from traditional allegory of painting is that the artist is not the individual painting, but rather the subject. Whitney Chadwick described this piece as "the first example of the woman artist consciously collapsing the subject-object position". Despite not being physically present in the scene, Anguissola established herself as the primary subject of the piece by making the self-portrait appear larger than the artist. Moreover, Anguissola also augmented the viewers role in the piece. Robert Grudin, in his book "The Lady in the Picture: Design and Revelation in Renaissance Art" stated how "by putting us in the exact position where she as model would have had to sit, Sofonisba is warping our personal space, destabilizing our own subjective paradigms and requiring us to identify with hers." This further emphasized the question of who was painting who in this art piece, adding another layer of complexity to it.

== Symbolism ==
=== Clothing ===
Clothing has been one of the main ways Sofonisba Anguissola has shaped her personal image in her self-portraits. In pieces such as Self Portrait at an Easel (1556–1565) and Self Portrait (1554), Anguissola is depicted in a simple black dress with a white frilled collar underneath. This was seen by many at the time as an attestation of the artist's beauty but also as a way for Anguissola to identify herself as a career artist.

However, Bernardino Campi Painting Sofonisba Anguissola differs from other pieces in Anguissola's repertoire because, instead of showing herself as an artist, she depicted herself as a noblewoman. After an extensive restoration process in 2002, it was revealed that instead of the black dress Anguissola was previously seen in, she was instead painted in a dress made of a red velvet embroidered with golden thread, a symbol of immense wealth at the time. This sudden shift in Anguissola's style has been highly debated by art historians, such as Claire Sandberg, with one of the most popular theories being that the artist wished to portray herself as the ideal member of the court. This painting was created prior to Anguissola's departure to Spain where she was to serve as the court painter under King Phillip II. The expensive attire was seen as a status symbol, showing the artist as a noblewoman as well as an artist.

=== Maulstick ===
Art historian Mary Garrard focused heavily on the inclusion of the Maulstick when trying to interpret the meaning behind this enigmatic piece. A maulstick is a padded stick, commonly used by amateur artists, that is used to steady or support one's hand while painting. Despite being a common tool among artists, professional or not, in this context many argued that it was added in by Anguissola as a jab at her former instructor. Sofonisba Anguissola had depicted herself using a maulstick in her 1556 piece entitled Self Portrait at an Easel, a piece created during her apprenticeship with Bernadino Campi.

=== Artistic style ===
The style in which both figures are depicted is another aspect of the painting that lends itself to the overall message of the piece. In the foreground, Bernadino Campi is rendered in a more detailed way than the level of detail that has become synonymous with Anguissola's artistic style. The artist captures features as small as the newly sprouted gray hairs on Campi's head all the way down to the microscopic amount of gold present on the artist's brush. The female figure, believed to be Sofonisba Anguissola, is not allotted the same amount of precision. Her face appears less naturalistic than that of her teachers and her dress more painterly than refined. Art historian Meghan Jane Kalasky Musolff suggests that this difference in detail is an acknowledgement that Anguissola's image was represented as a painting within the whole portrait.

== Interpretation ==
=== Mary D. Garrard ===
One of the most popular interpretations of Bernardino Campi Painting Sofonisba Anguissola is attributed to Mary D. Garrard. In her article "Here's Looking at Me: Sofonisba Anguissola and the Problem of the Woman Artist" published in 1994, Garrard argued that this was a display of the artists wit. By removing herself from the piece and instead attributing her work to a man, she is calling attention to the double standards of being a female artist during the 16th century. With it being shown as a piece by Campi, according to Garrard, it highlighted the common belief of the time that art, and creation in general, was masculine in nature.

The inclusion of Bernadino Campi was another element that was aimed to draw attention to the double standards present at the time. Mary D. Garrard referenced a 1554 letter sent to Campi by Florentine painter Francesco Salviati in which he described Anguissola as "the beautiful Cremonese painter, your [Campi's] creation". Garrard compared this type of relationship to the Greek myth of Pygmalion in which an artist's sculpture of a beautiful woman was brought to life by the goddess Aphrodite. By equating Campi to Pygmalion, it adds a sense of irony that would justify the seemingly random inclusion of Anguissola's teacher in the piece. By painting a picture Anguissola herself painted, it showed that he is not responsible for her talent. The inclusion of the maulstick, seen as a tool for amateur artists, further emphasized this point since it showed that not only is her talent her own but it surpassed Campi's.

=== Claire Sandberg ===
Claire Sandberg's interpretation of the piece hinged significantly on the time in which it was created as well as new information from a 2002 restoration of the painting. In 1559, not long after the creation of Bernardino Campi Painting Sofonisba Anguissola, Sofonisba Anguissola moved to Spain and began to work as the court painter for King Philip II. Sandberg argued that this piece was meant to be Anguissola's way of advertising herself to the king of Spain as someone worthy of being part of his court.

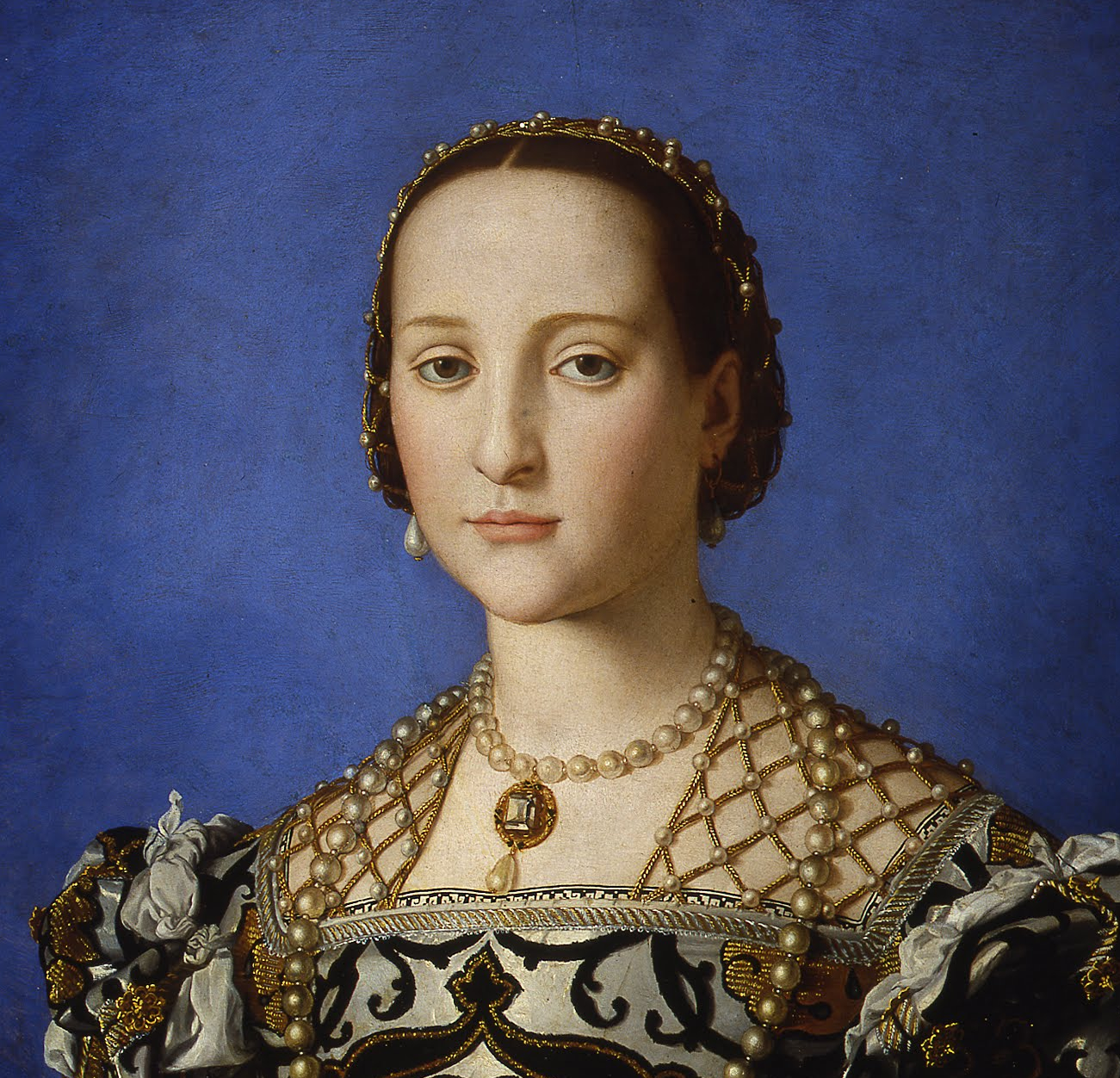
Detail showing pearl earring in Bronzino – Eleonora di Toledo col figlio Giovanni – Google Art Project (cropped)

The red velvet dress embroidered with gold Anguissola was depicted in was one of the only examples in which that artist chose to show herself as a noble instead of an artist. The dress itself would have been extremely expensive at the time and, combined with the pearl earrings which appear to be a reference to the ones worn by Eleanor Toledo in Bronzino's piece The Portrait of Eleanor of Toledo and Her Son (1545), showcased that the artist came from wealth.

Another part of this theory set forth by Claire Sandberg is that this piece was meant to be a tribute to Sofonisba Anguissola's teacher, Bernadino Campi. While this theory is highly contested due to the various symbols which label Campi as an amateur compared to Anguissola, Sandberg relies heavily on the knowledge that the two artists remained close friends after Anguissola's training came to an end. Alongside honoring her teacher, it allowed for the artist to emphasize her humility by putting distance between herself and the creation of the painting. While Sofonisba Anguissola was the one who painted the piece, by choosing to depict herself as a noblewoman being painted by another artist it could have served as a symbol of modesty. However, Anguissola does augment the painting of herself in a way that asserted this piece was an exhibition of her skill, not Campi's. The painting of Sofonisba Anguissola is less rendered than the portrait of Bernadino Campi. The artist made the piece appear more painterly and ignored smaller details such as the woman's fingernails, which are absent.

== See also ==
- List of paintings by Sofonisba Anguissola
