= Portrait of Minerva Anguissola (Milan) =

Painting by Sofonisba Anguissola

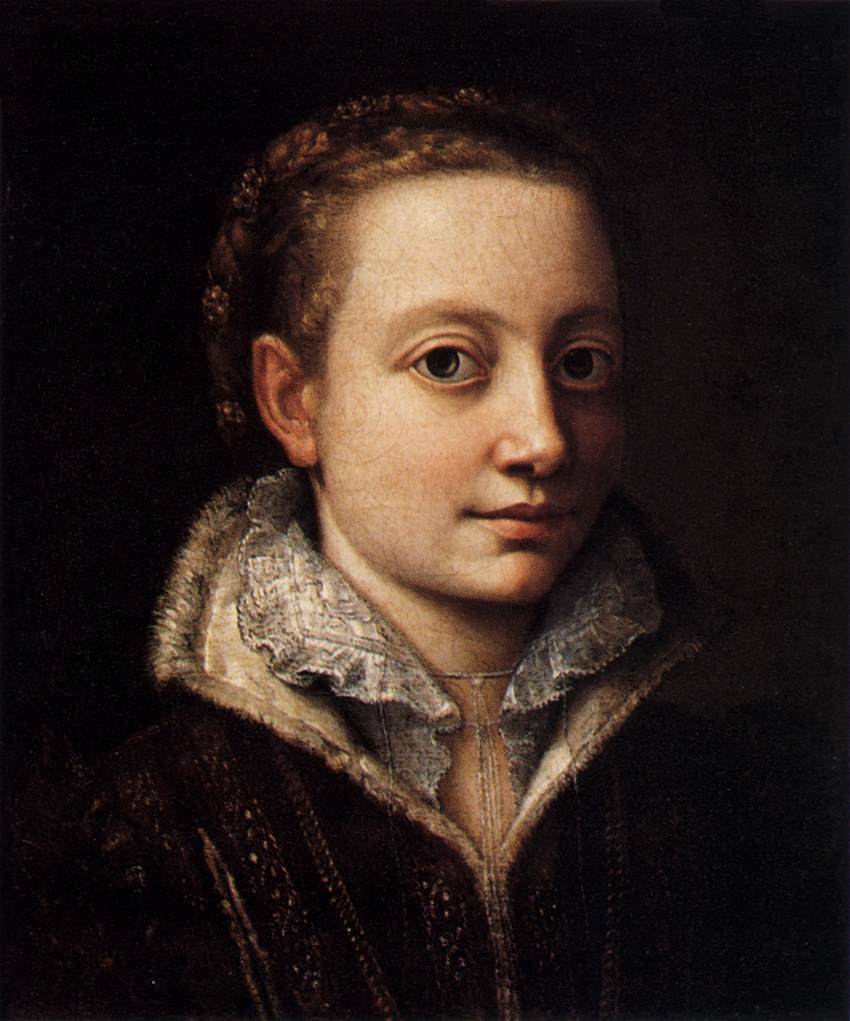
- Artist: Sofonisba Anguissola
- Year: c. 1564
- Medium: Oil on canvas
- Subject: Minerva Anguissola (possibly a self-portrait instead)
- Dimensions: 36 cm × 29 cm (14 in × 11 in)
- Location: Pinacoteca di Brera, Milan

Portrait of Minerva Anguissola is a c. 1564 oil-on-canvas painting by the Italian painter Sofonisba Anguissola, now in the Pinacoteca di Brera in Milan.

Its subject is believed to be the artist's sister, Minerva Anguissola, not to be confused with her older sister Elena Anguissola who took the name of "Sister Minerva" upon entering holy orders at the convent of San Vincenzo in Mantua. In comparison, one can see Elena Anguissola, painted as a novice by Sofonisba Anguissola in Portrait of Elena Anguissola.

However some art historians argue that the painting is in fact a self-portrait produced during the artist's stay in Spain.

== See also ==
- List of paintings by Sofonisba Anguissola
