= Self-portrait at an Easel (Sofonisba Anguissola) =

Painting by Sofonisba Anguissola

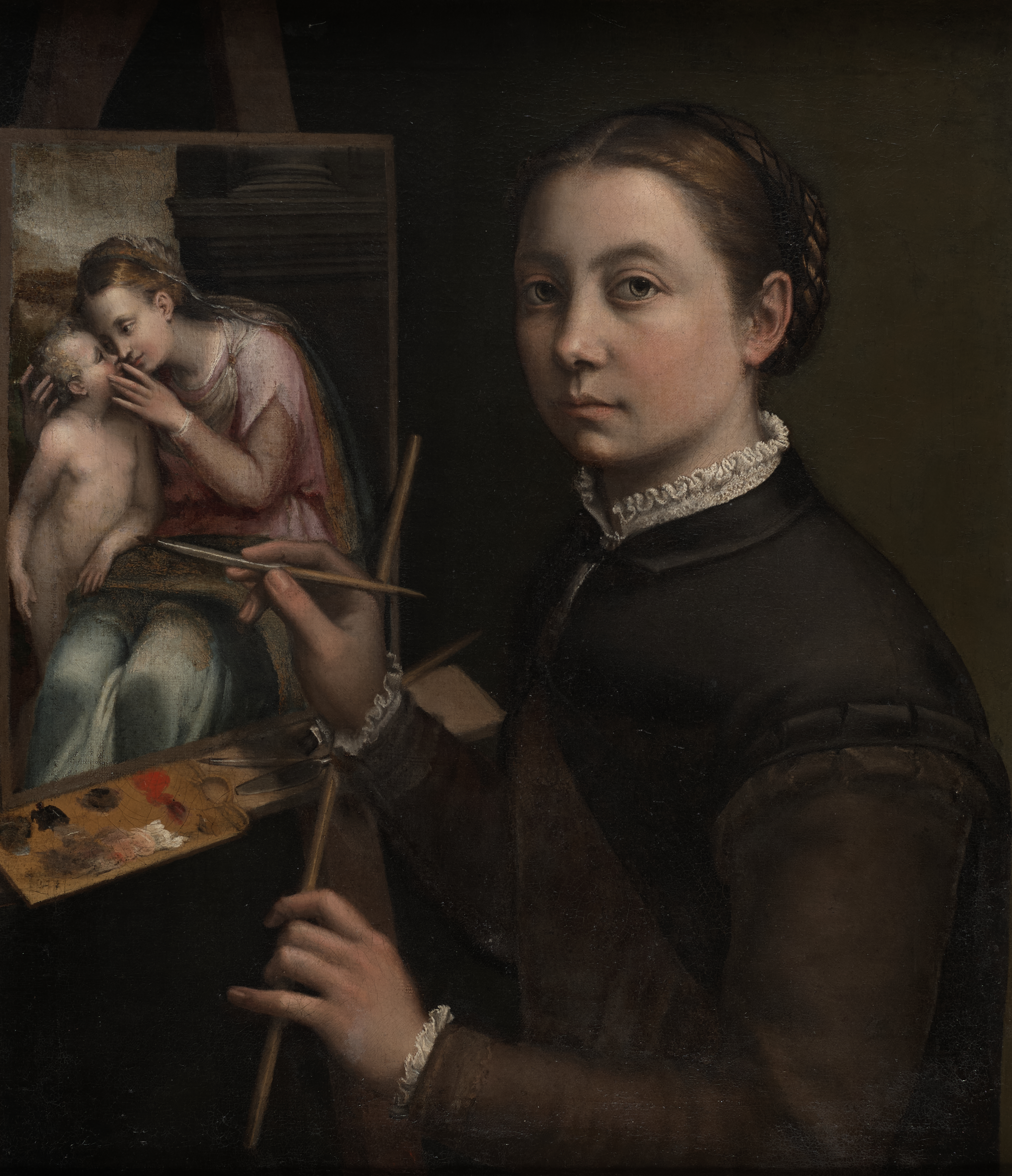
- Artist: Sofonisba Anguissola
- Year: 1556
- Medium: Oil on canvas
- Dimensions: 66 cm × 57 cm (26 in × 22 in)
- Location: Łańcut Castle; Łańcut, Poland

Self-portrait at an Easel is an oil-on-canvas painting created c. 1556–1565 by the Italian Renaissance painter Sofonisba Anguissola, now in Łańcut Castle. From the same era as Self-Portrait at a Spinet (Naples) it shows the artist painting a devotional canvas and is one of a group of self-portraits which also includes Self-Portrait (Vienna) and Miniature Self Portrait (Boston).

== See also ==
- List of paintings by Sofonisba Anguissola
