= Portrait of Elena Anguissola (Southampton) =

Painting by Sofonisba Aguissola

The Artist's Sister Elena in the Garb of a Nun
- Elena Anguissola
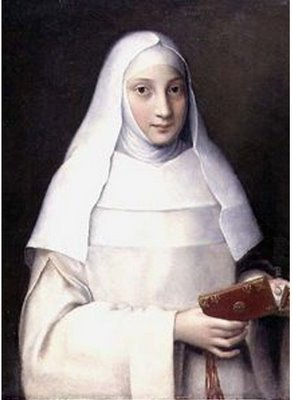
- Artist: Sofonisba Anguissola
- Year: 1551
- Medium: oil paint, canvas
- Dimensions: 68.5 cm (27.0 in) × 53.3 cm (21.0 in)
- Location: Southampton City Art Gallery
- Accession: SOTAG : 3

The Portrait of Elena Anguissola (alternative name: Portrait of the artist’s sister Elena in the garb of a nun), dated to 1551, is one of the earliest paintings by Sofonisba Anguissola. An oil painting on canvas, it is in the Southampton City Art Gallery, which acquired it in 1936.

== Description ==
This portrait shows the nun Elena Anguissola, a novice with the name of Sister Minerva. The painting is signed and dated but difficult to read: : SOPHONISBA ANGUSSOLA VIRGO M [...] TERI AGO.TI PINXIT MDLI. Flavio Caroli completed the inscription, adding the following: MONASTERI SANCTI AGOSTINI. Elena Anguissola was a nun in the convent of di Sant'Agostino, in Mantua.

The painting demonstrates the ability and expressive force of the painter, and the preference for an expressive physiognomy, typical of cinquecento painting in Lombardy. The attention to psychological expression illustrated here is also present in many other paintings by Sofonisba Anguissola. In The Game of Chess (1555) and Self-Portrait at a Spinet, the painter depicted female ability in playing chess or a musical instrument as an essential part of a young noble woman's education.

The Portrait of Elena Anguissola was in the collection of the Earl of Yaborough, remaining there until 1936, when it was acquired by the museum in Southampton. According to Rossana Sacchi it was at one time attributed to Titian. Only later was it recognised as a work of Sofonisba Anguissola and as of a portrait of her sister Elena.

The portrait of the religious woman is done on a dark background. The young nun holds in her hands a tiny book covered with red leather and trimmed with gold. The style of the painting recalls Correggio, Lorenzo Lotto, and Bernardino Gatti. Anguissola lingers on certain details and captures the sweetness, and the intensity of the look and the calmness of the nun to create a silent and contemplative image, built around the almost solid geometries of the nun's costume.

== See also ==
- List of paintings by Sofonisba Anguissola==

== Bibliography ==
- Sacchi, Federico (1872), Tip. Ronzi e Signori (ed.), Notizie pittoriche cremonesi, pp. 6–7
- Caroli, Flavio (1987), A. Mondadori (ed.), Sofonisba Anguissola e le sue sorelle, pp. 24–26 and 92–93
- Rodeschini, Maria Cristina (1994). "Pittura a Cremona dal Romanico al Settecento". Sofonisba Anguissola e le Sue Sorelle. Milano: Leonardo arte: 274–275.
- Gregori, Mina (1994). "Sofonisba Anguissola". Sofonisba Anguissola e le Sue Sorelle. Milano: Leonardo arte: 18–19.
- Sacchi, Rossana (1994). "La famiglia Anguissola". Sofonisba Anguissola e le Sue Sorelle. Milano: Leonardo arte: 186–187.
- AA VV, Catalogo della mostra tenuta a Cremona nel 1994, a Vienna e a Washington nel 1995
