= Child Bitten by a Lobster =

1550s drawing by Sofonisba Anguissola

- Asdrubale bitten by a crayfish
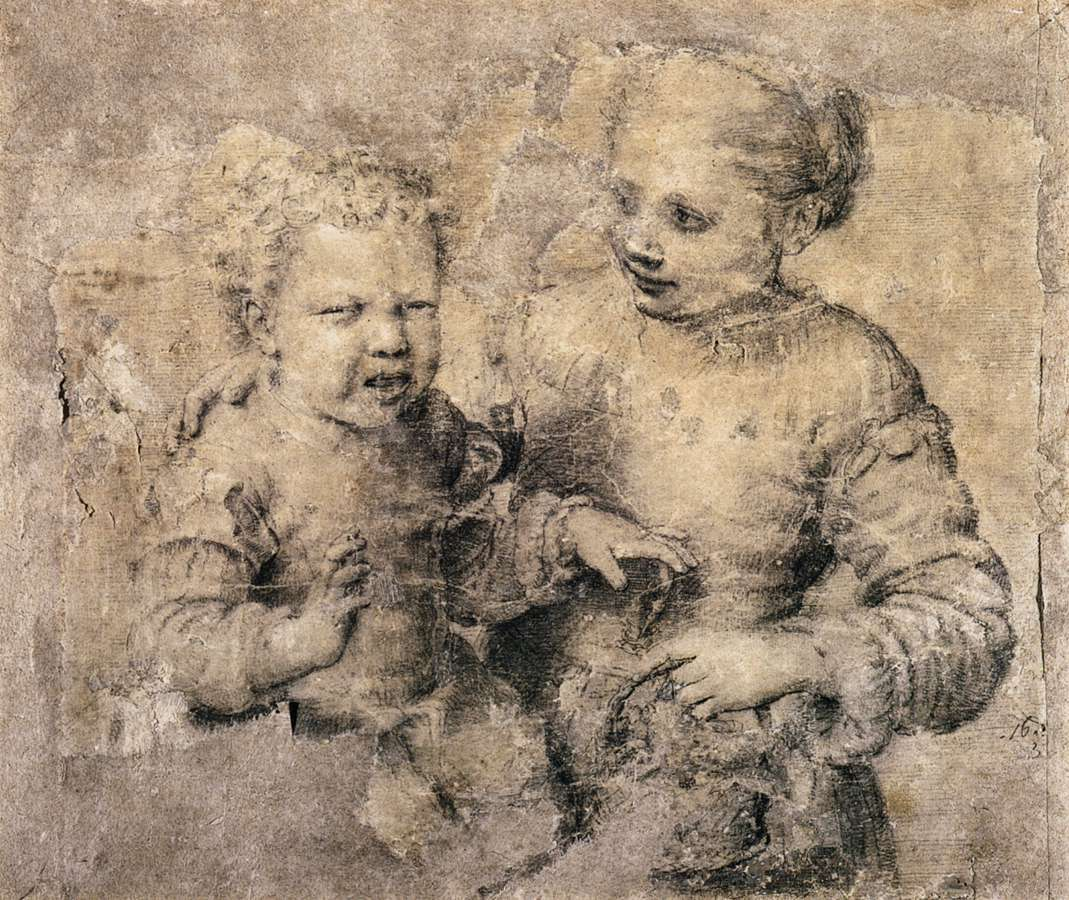
- Year: c. 1554
- Dimensions: 33.3 cm (13.1 in) × 38.5 cm (15.2 in)
- Location: Italy

The Child Bitten by A Lobster is a drawing by the Italian painter Sofonisba Anguissola, executed in chalk and pencil on light blue paper, and dated to around 1554. It is in the collection of the Museo di Capodimonte, in Naples.

== History ==
This drawing was originally in the collection of cardinal Fulvio Orsini. Around 1600 it was inherited by cardinal Odoardo Farnese, together with other works by Sofonisba Anguissola: The Game of Chess, the Self-Portrait at a Spinet, and an unidentified drawing. Then it came to the Bourbon of Naples, via the Farnese inheritance and is present in the 1644 and 1653 inventories of Palazzo Farnese, in Rome. In 1799 was taken to Naples and here the attribution to Sofonisba Anguissola was lost.

From a letter written by Tommaso Cavalieri to Cosimo I de' Medici, on 20 January 1562, accompanying the gift of two drawings (one of which was the Old Woman Studying the Alphabet and Laughing Girl by Sofonisba Anguissola and the other was Cleopatra di Michelangelo Buonarroti), we know that Child Bitten by A Lobster was made on the suggestion of Michelangelo – to whom it had been sent for viewing – and depicted Asdrubale, the younger brother of Sofonisba (born in 1551):

Having a drawing by the hand of the Cremonese noble woman called Sofhonisba Angosciosa [sic], today a lady in waiting for the Queen of Spain, I sent it was this [a Cleopatra by Michelangelo] and I believe that it is of equal merit to many other drawings, not only because it is beautiful but it is also inventive, and this is something that the divine Michelangelo, having seeing a drawing by her hand of a laughing boy, said that he wanted to see a crying putto as that was even more difficult too, and having written this, she sent him this studied portrait of her crying brother.

— Tommaso Cavalieri, "Lettera"

According to Roberto Longhi, this version was originally thought to be a copy and that the original drawing was in Berlin in a private collection. It was then attributed to Santi di Tito and the Berlin drawing was then considered a copy. Engravings were made from this drawing.

== Description ==
The child (Asdrubale Anguissola) has put his hand in a basket, where a lobster is hidden. He cries from the sudden pain, next to his little sister (Europa Anguissola). This drawing, which anticipates Caravaggio's Boy Bitten by a Lizard, depicts one of the first expressions by the artist in which a sudden physical pain provokes an outpouring of grief. The naturalism, deriving from the studies of physiognomy by Leonardo da Vinci, spread in 1550s Lombardy and was also taken up by Anguissola.

== Bibliography ==
- Roberto Longhi, Me pinxit e quesiti caravaggeschi: 1928-1934, Firenze, Sansoni, 1968, SBN IT\ICCU\UFI\0150711. Ristampa di studi pubblicati dal 1928 al 1934.
- Flavio Caroli, Sofonisba Anguissola e le sue sorelle, Milano, A. Mondadori, 1987, SBN IT\ICCU\CFI\0111864.
- AA VV, Sofonisba Anguissola e le sue sorelle, Milano, Leonardo arte, 1994, SBN IT\ICCU\VEA\0063954. Catalogo della mostra tenuta a Cremona nel 1994, a Vienna e a Washington nel 1995.
- Giulio Bora, Sofonisba Anguissola e la formazione cremonese: il ruolo del disegno, in Sofonisba Anguissola e le sue sorelle, Milano, Leonardo arte, 1994, pp. 79-88, SBN IT\ICCU\VEA\0063954.
- Flavio Caroli, Ritratti di famiglia in un interno, un fanciullo, un granchio e la Fisiognomica del Cinquecento, in Sofonisba Anguissola e le sue sorelle, Milano, Leonardo arte, 1994, pp. 47-56, SBN IT\ICCU\VEA\0063954.
- (EN) Italian women artists from Renaissance to Baroque, Milano, Skira, 2007, SBN IT\ICCU\VEA\0702687.

== See also ==
- List of paintings by Sofonisba Anguissola
