= Two Children Teasing a Cat =

Painting by Annibale Carracci

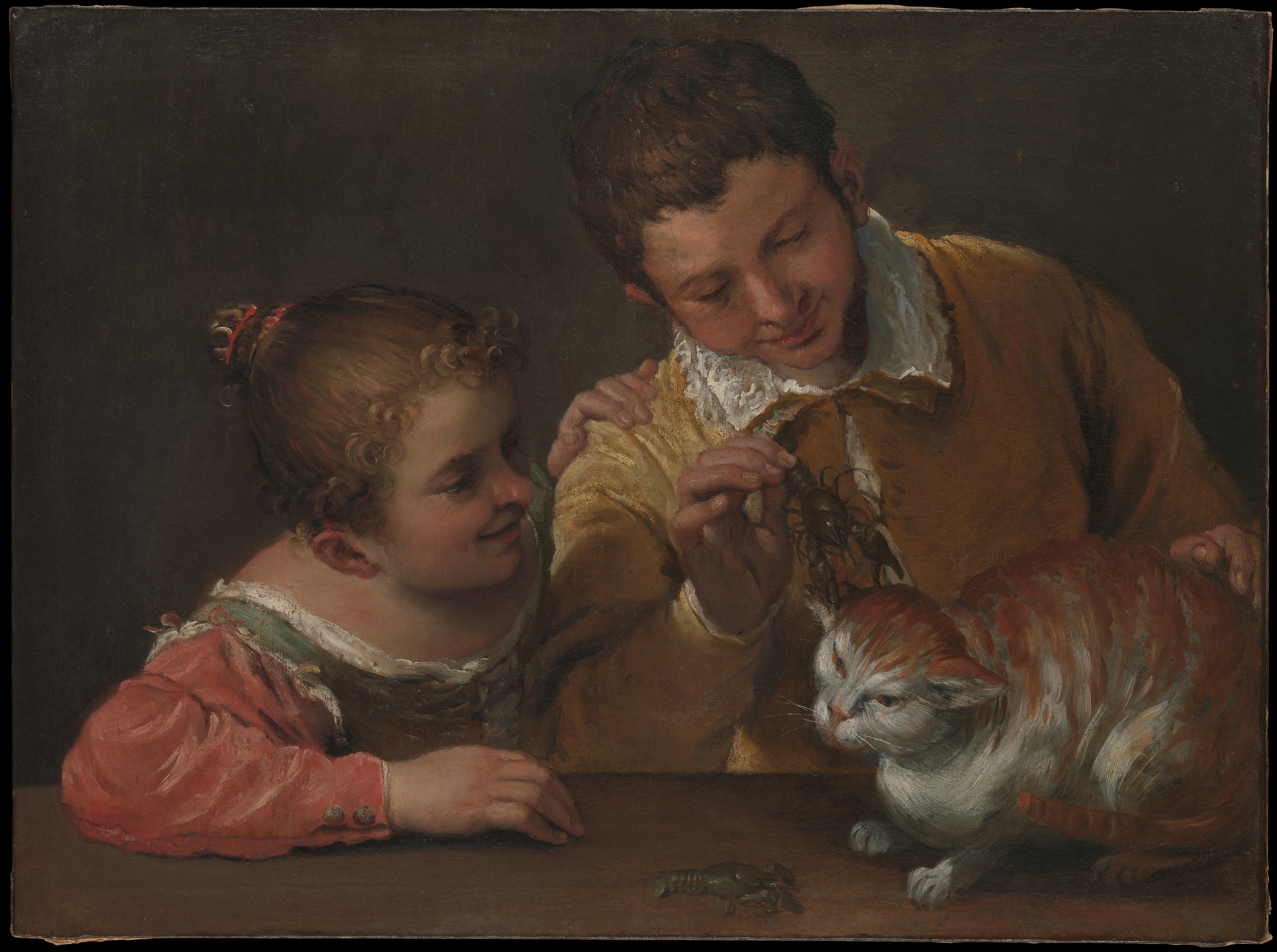
Two Children Teasing a Cat (1587–1588) by Annibale Carracci

Two Children Teasing a Cat is an oil painting on canvas created c. 1587–1588 by the Italian painter Annibale Carracci, now in the Metropolitan Museum of Art in New York, which acquired it in 1994.

Previously attributed to Agostino Carracci, Roberto Longhi gave it its present attribution, now largely accepted. No documents survive on its commissioning and so its dating is purely on stylistic grounds. This places it in the artist's relative youth, when he was still producing several genre works. The influence of Tintoretto and other Venetian artists is evident, placing it at the end of the 1580s, at which time the artist is known to have been staying in Venice.

== Analysis ==
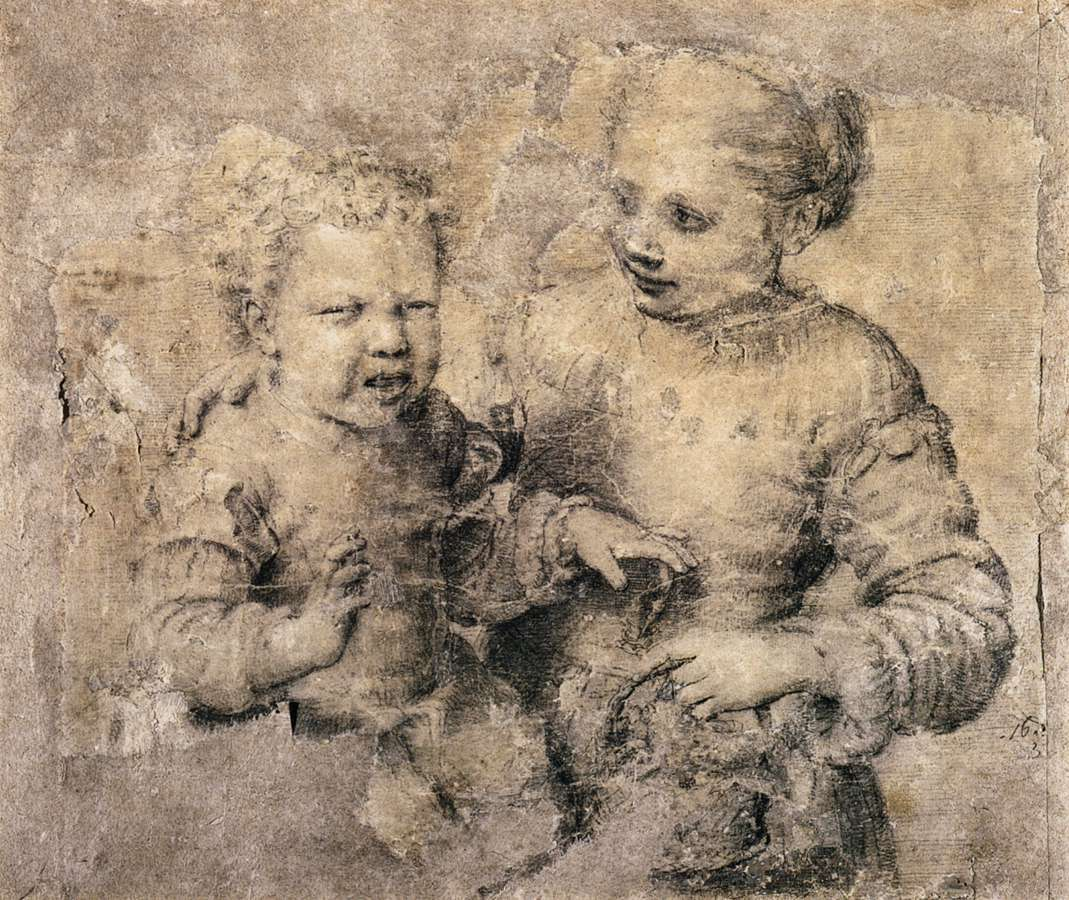
Sofonisba Anguissola, Boy Bitten by a Crawfish, c. 1554, Museo di Capodimonte, Naples

The painting depicts two children intent on a malicious prank on a cat. The boy holds a shrimp in his hand and is trying to insert its claw into the right ear of the unfortunate feline, who has already assumed a wary posture.

Annibale's composition has been linked to a painting by Sofonisba Anguissola, now lost and known only through a famous preparatory drawing, depicting a Boy Bitten by a Crawfish. The same drawing by Anguissola is believed to have been the source of inspiration for Caravaggio's Boy Bitten by a Lizard.

Compared to these other works, however, despite the similarity of the theme, Annibale chose a different moment in the episode. While Sofonisba's drawing and Caravaggio's painting depict the inevitable conclusion of the reckless game and the protagonists are already paying the consequences, Annibale's canvas is dominated by an effect of suspension, awaiting the outcry that will be produced in a moment, when the cat will be "bitten".

It has been hypothesized that, although humorous, the work contains a mild moral warning (following the example of many Flemish school paintings derived from local proverbs) to take into account the possible consequences – in this case the cat's reaction – of reckless actions.

The painting must have been particularly popular in the Bologna area, as evidenced by several works believed to derive from Annibale's composition. Among these is a canvas by Giuseppe Maria Crespi, depicting a Girl Playing with a Cat and a Mouse (ca. 1695–1700, Fitzwilliam Museum).
