= Lucia Anguissola =

Italian artist (1536 or 1538 – c. 1565-1568)

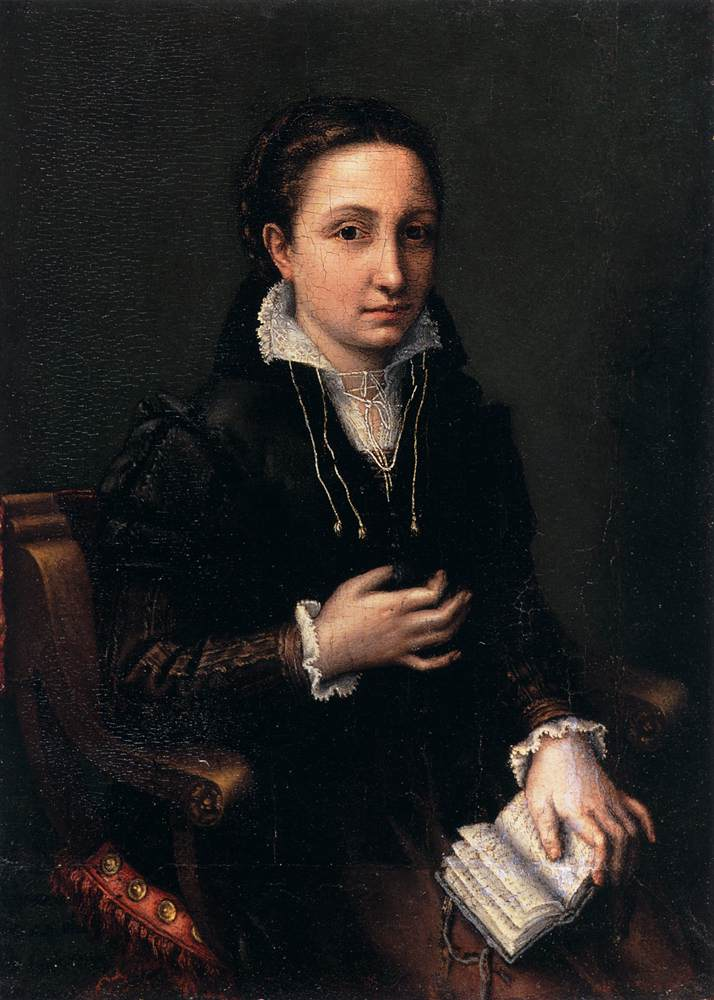
- Lucia Anguissola, Self-Portrait, 1557, Castello Sforzesco, Milan
- Born: Lucia Anguissola; 1536 or 1538; Cremona, Duchy of Milan
- Died: Before 1568 (aged about 30)
- Occupation: Painter
- Movement: Mannerism
- Relatives: Sofonisba Anguissola (sister); Elena Anguissola (sister); Anna Maria Anguissola (sister)

Lucia Anguissola (1536 or 1538 – before 1568) was an Italian Mannerist painter of the late Renaissance. Born in Cremona, Italy, she was the third daughter among the seven children of Amilcare Anguissola and Bianca Ponzoni. Her father was a member of the Genoese minor nobility and encouraged his five daughters to develop artistic skills alongside their humanist education. Lucia most likely trained with her renowned eldest sister Sofonisba Anguissola. Her paintings, mainly portraits, are similar in style and technique to those of her sister. Contemporary critics considered her skill exemplary; according to seventeenth-century biographer Filippo Baldinucci, Lucia had the potential to "become a better artist than even Sofonisba" had she not died so young.

One of her extant paintings, Portrait of Pietro Manna, (early 1560s) was praised by Giorgio Vasari, who saw it when he visited the family after her death. He wrote that Lucia, "dying, had left of herself not less fame than that of Sofonisba, through several paintings by her own hand, not less beautiful and valuable than those by the sister."

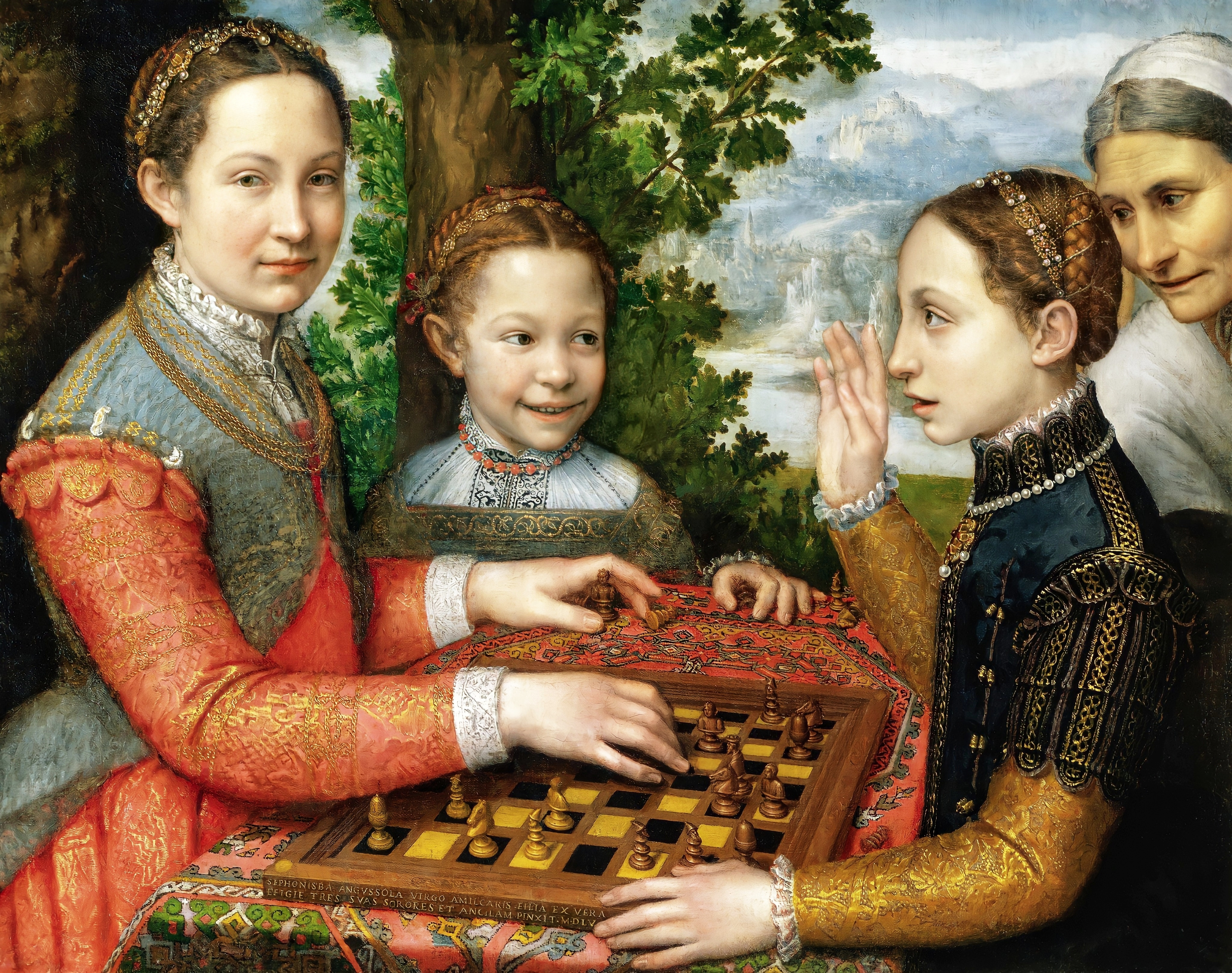
Sofonisba Anguissola, The Chess Game, 1555

Lucia Anguissola is represented in a painting of 1555 by her sister Sofonisba titled The Chess Game, along with her younger sisters Minerva and Europa. Lucia appears at the far left, with both hands on the chess board; Europa, smiling, is the youngest girl; and Minerva appears at the right, raising her right hand; a servant stands behind them. The painting suggests the interactions between the siblings and represents their high status. Lucia gazes directly at the viewer, suggesting her connection to Sofonisba, but also seeming to invite the viewer to join in.

== Paintings ==
=== Portrait of Pietro Manna (Maria) ===
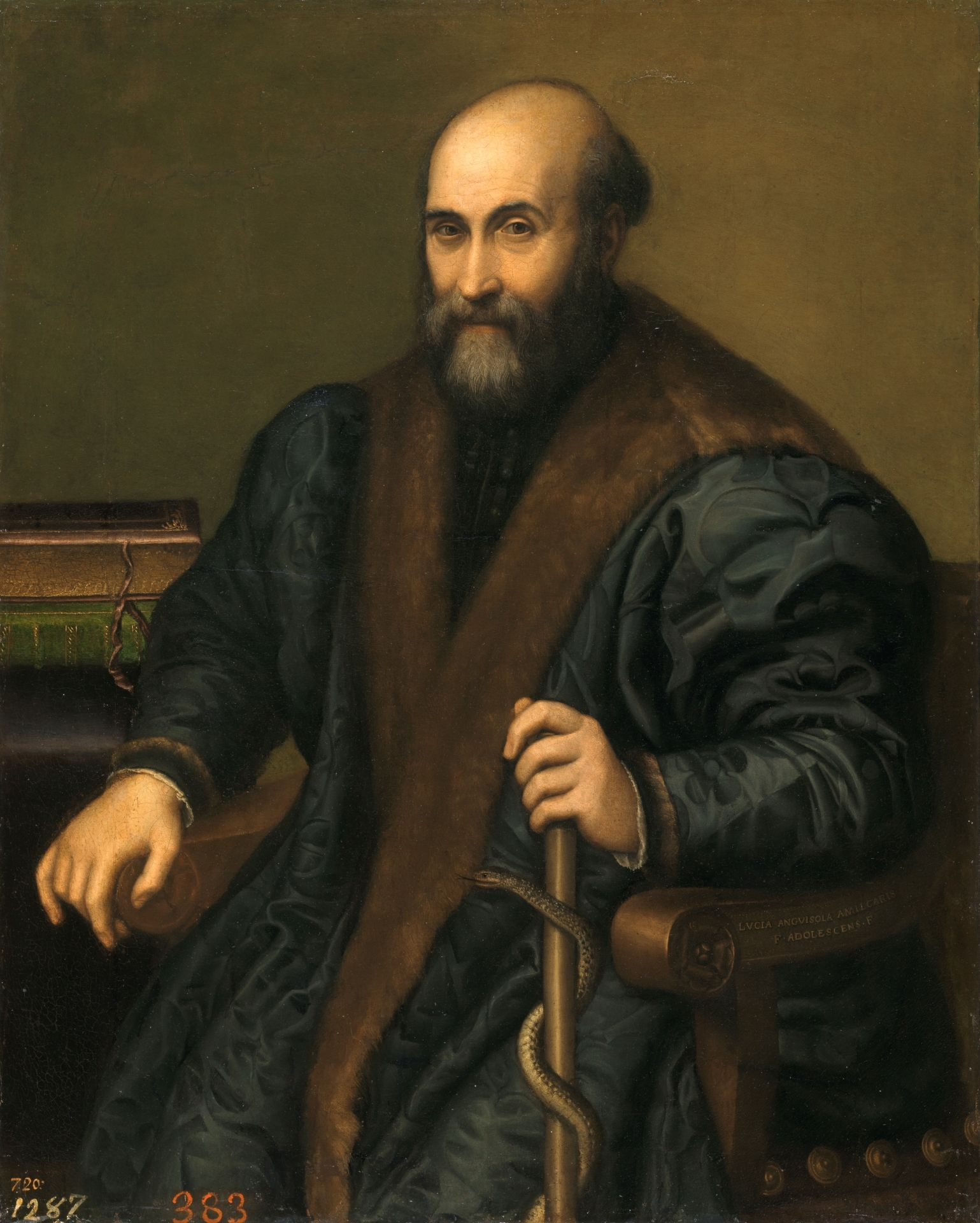
Lucia Anguissola, Portrait of Pietro Maria or Portrait of Pietro Manna, 1557–1560, Madrid, Museo del Prado

The Portrait of Pietro Manna, misidentified by Giorgio Vasari as a portrait of Pietro Maria, is estimated to be made around 1557–1560. The portrait suggests aspects of Lucia's education in humanism, classical mythology, psychology, and art. It is also the only painting she signed with her full name. Her signature reads “Lucia Anguissola Amilcaris F[ilia] Adolescens F[ecit].” This could translate as “Lucia Anguissola, adolescent daughter of Amilcare, made this,” although one argument suggests that the word "adolescens" might be better translated as "growing" and used to indicate that she was continuing to mature, as Lucia Anguissola should have been in her early twenties when she made this portrait.

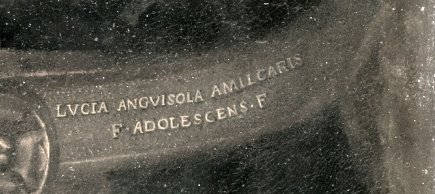
Signature on the painting of Pietro Manna

In this painting, she represented her family's name and heritage. The man sitting in the portrait is thought to be a relative to the Anguissola family, and commonly assumed to be a physician or doctor, but that is false. The snake on the rod in his left hand has two meanings. A rod with a snake wrapped around it can be an Asclepeion rod, indicating a medical symbol, but in this case the snake most likely serves as a visual translation of the artist's name, "Anguis Sola," which appeared on her family coat of arms as "Anguis Sola Fecit Vinctoriam," literally translating “the lone snake became victorious.” The Asclepeion rod could also be a sign of Lucia Anguissola's education in classical mythology; she is one of the first artists to place it in the hands of a contemporary. This painting may have been intended to indicate the rise of the next female painter in the Anguissola family. Her father, Amilcare, showed it to Giorgio Vasari shortly after Lucia died. The man in the portrait is depicted with a sensitive portrayal, in a restricted palette of greys and browns. Lucia's skill is demonstrated in her ability to illustrate the sitter's personality in the animated face with a cocked eyebrow and the shoulders held at different levels.

=== Self Portrait ===
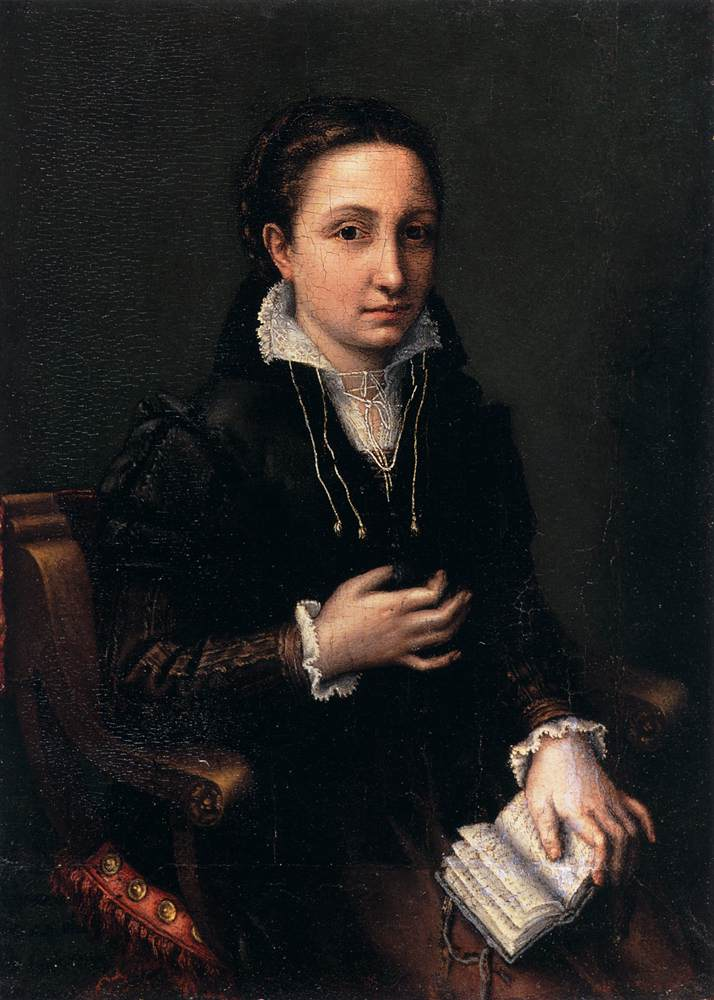
Lucia Anguissola, Self Portrait, 1557

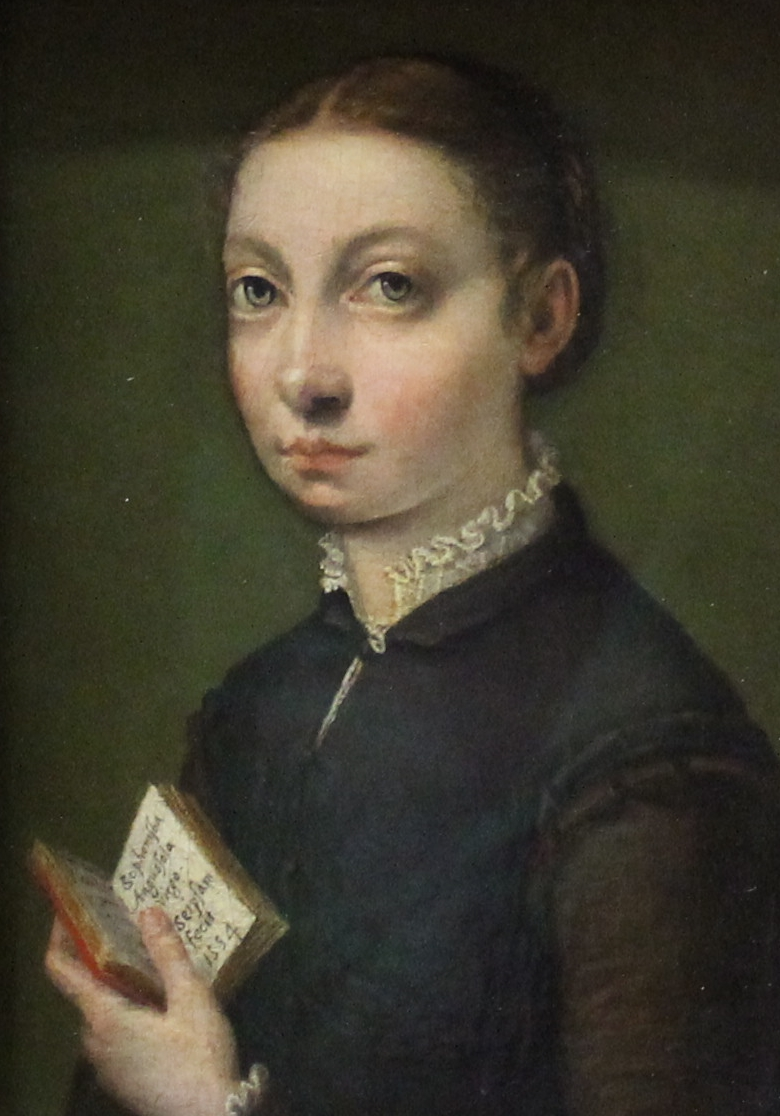
Sofonisba Anguissola, Self Portrait, 1554

In Lucia Anguissola's Self Portrait (1557) she portrays herself sitting in modest clothing, with a book in her left hand. This book has been identified as either a prayer book or a Petrarchan. Her right hand rests on her heart, similar to her sister Sofonisba's own self-portrait of 1554. There are many other similarities between the two self-portraits, such as clothing choices and gaze, but both can be attributed to the sisters' upbringing and maturity. Her clothing is meant to represent her modest and elegant exterior. One art historian has suggested that Lucia Anguissola's "suspended" and "gloomy" gaze alludes to her feelings about living in Sofonisba's shadow. This element is in many of Lucia's portraits—as well as in Sofonisba's painting The Chess Game—and may reference the inferiority she felt compared to her sister.

=== Other works ===
Lucia's only other signed work is a half-length self-portrait (c. 1557). Lucia also painted a Virgin and Child, and A Portrait of a Woman (early 1560s; Rome, Gal. Borghese) is thought to be either a self-portrait by her or Sofonisba, or a portrait of Lucia by Sofonisba. Two portraits, in the Pinacoteca Tosio Martinengo in Brescia and the Museo Poldi Pezzoli in Milan, probably of Minerva Anguissola, may also be by Lucia.

== Bibliography ==
- Henry Gardiner Adams, ed. (1857). "Angusciola, Lucia". A Cyclopaedia of Female Biography: 44. Wikidata Q115738537.
- Perlingieri, Ilya Sandra, Sofonisba Anguissola,, Rizzoli International, 1992 ISBN 0-8478-1544-7
- Harris, Anne Sutherland and Linda Nochlin, Women Artists: 1550-1950, Los Angeles County Museum of Art, Knopf, New York, 1976
