= Portrait of Giovanni Battista Caselli =

Painting by Sofonisba Anguissola

- Giovanni Battista Caselli, poet from Cremona
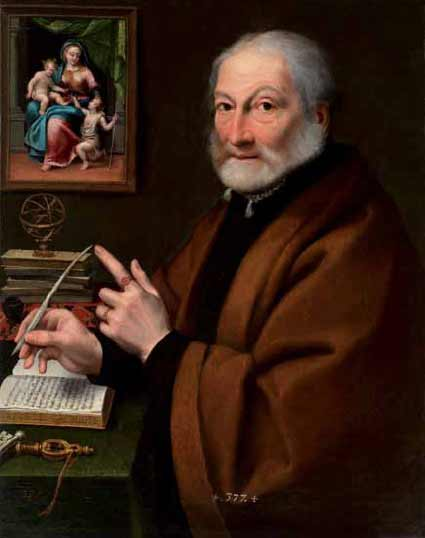
- Artist: Sofonisba Anguissola
- Year: 1550s
- Medium: oil paint, canvas
- Dimensions: 77.7 cm (30.6 in) × 61.4 cm (24.2 in)
- Location: Museo del Prado
- Accession no.: P008110

The Portrait of Giovanni Battista Caselli is a half-length portrait executed by the Italian sixteenth-century artist Sofonisba Anguissola. Caselli was a poet from Cremona, the same city as the Anguissola. Executed in 1559, it was one of her last paintings before departing to the royal court of Spain, where she would become official painter to the queen of Spain, Isabel de Valois.

There is no signature on the painting, although it is possible that the painting has been cut, and that the signature was by one of the edges of the painting.

Caselli points to a painting of the Madonna with child Jesus, and John the Baptist – this is presumably intended to show Caselli's spiritual concerns.

The painting hangs in the Prado Museum, Madrid. It was purchased on behalf of the Prado by the Spanish state in 2012.

== See also ==
- List of paintings by Sofonisba Anguissola
