= Portrait of Elisabeth of Valois =

Painting by Sofonisba Anguissola

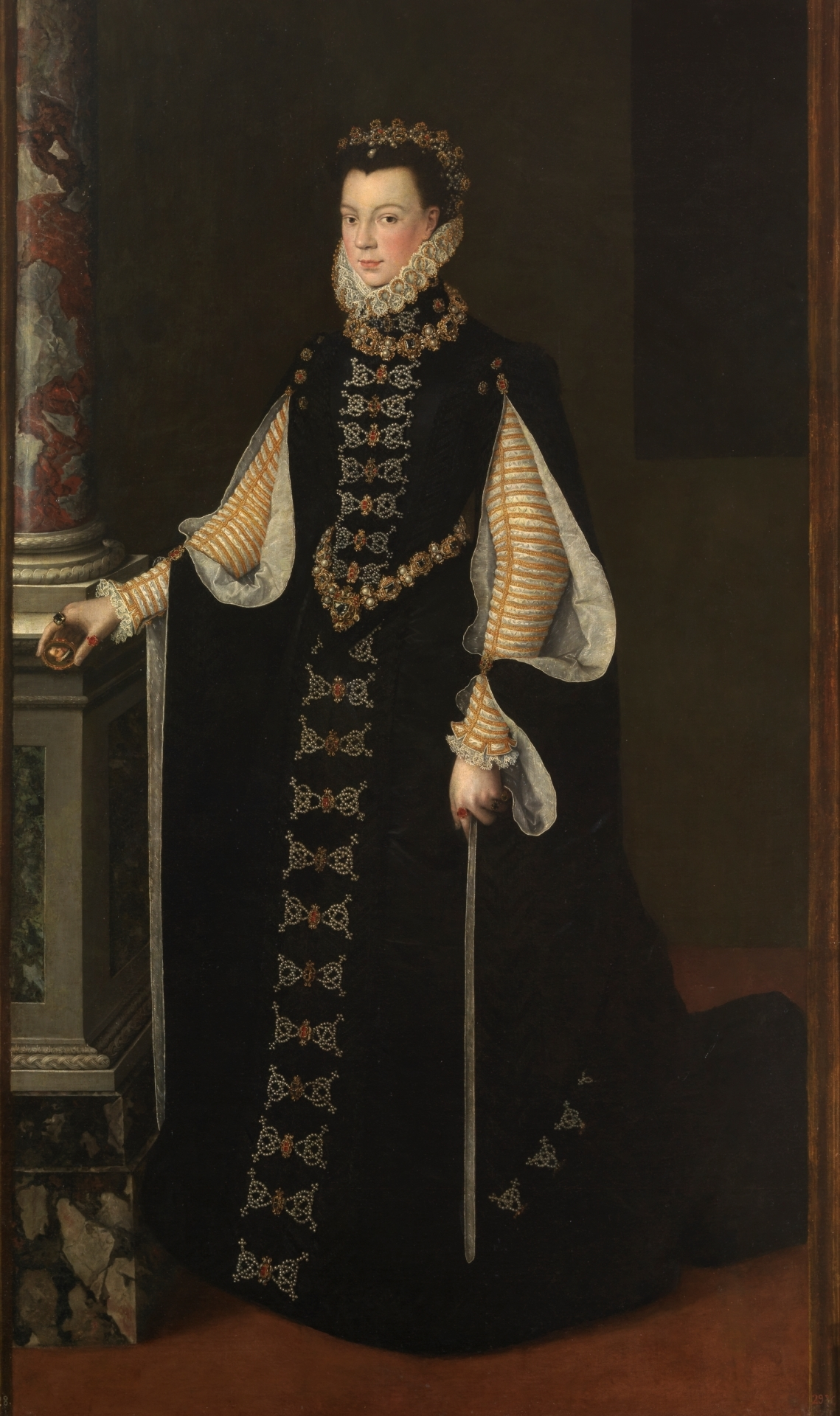
- Artist: Sofonisba Anguissola
- Year: 1561-1565
- Medium: oil on canvas
- Dimensions: 81.1 cm × 48.4 cm (31.9 in × 19.1 in)
- Location: Museo del Prado, Madrid

Portrait of Elisabeth of Valois is an oil-on-canvas painting executed c.1561–1565 by the Italian artist Sofonisba Anguissola, now in the Museo del Prado, in Madrid.

It shows Elisabeth of Valois, third wife of Philip II of Spain. Its iconography derives from Titian's Portrait of Isabella of Portugal, Philip's mother. Elisabeth is shown holding a miniature of Philip in her right hand, whilst her black clothing testifies to the austerity of the Spanish court at that time.

== See also ==
- List of paintings by Sofonisba Anguissola
