= Portrait of Prince Alessandro Farnese =

c. 1560 painting by Sofonisba Anguissola

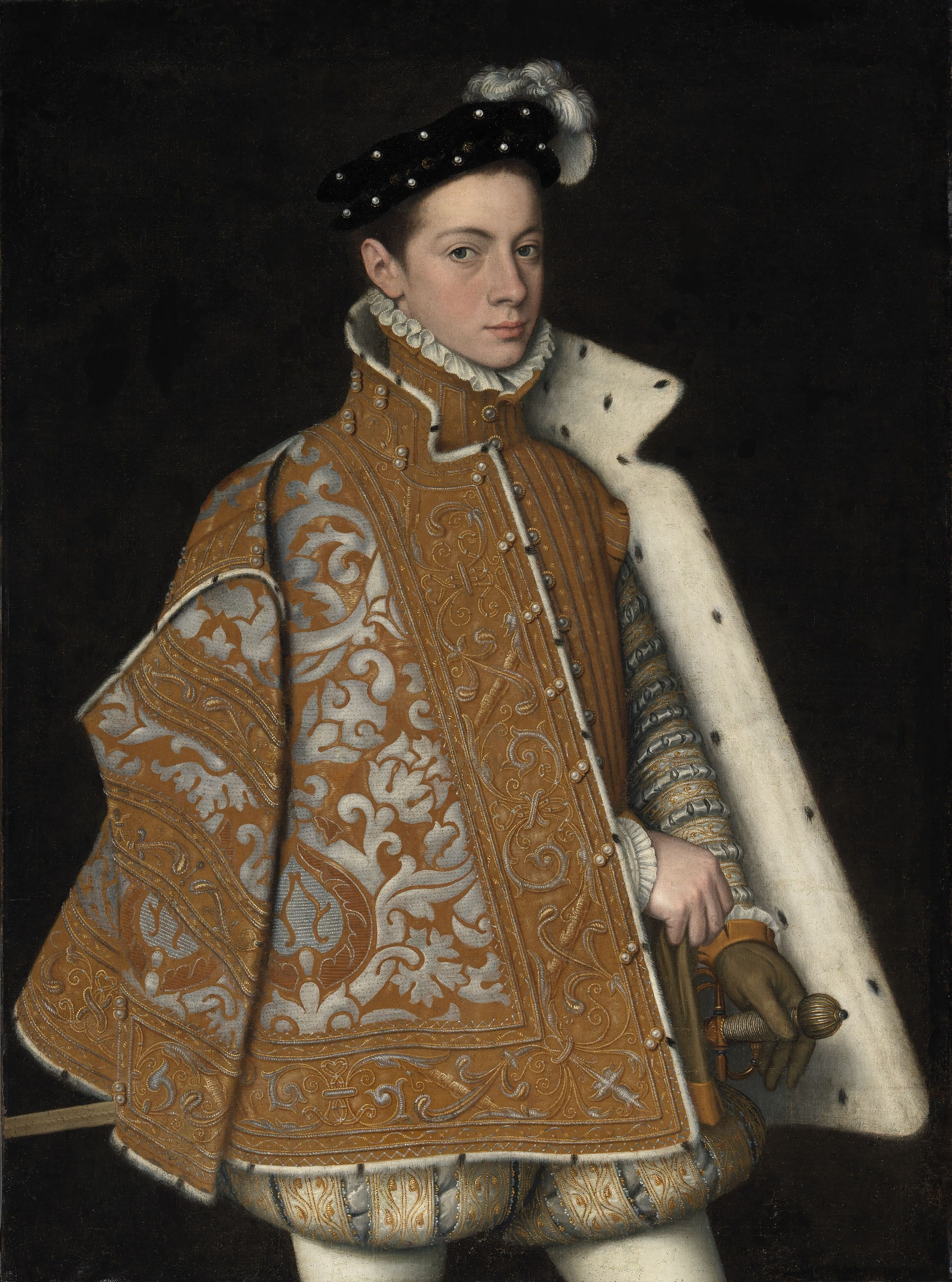
- Year: c. 1560 (Julian)
- Dimensions: 107 cm (42 in) × 79 cm (31 in)
- Identifiers: Bildindex der Kunst und Architektur ID: 20284071

The Portrait of Prince Alessandro Farnese is a painting by the 16th-century Italian artist Sofonisba Anguissola. It depicts the prince, later the Duke of Parma and Piacenza, as 15-year old boy, dressed in refined courtly clothing. Prince Alessandro was the son of Ottavio Farnese, Duke of Parma, and the grandson of King Charles V of Spain. The portrait was painted in c. 1560 and now hangs in the National Gallery of Ireland, in Dublin.

The painting was purchased by the National Gallery of Ireland in 1864. At the time it was attributed to Alonso Sánchez Coello, but later study of the painting revealed it to be the work of Anguissola. The reattribution revealed this to have been the first painting by a female artist to enter the gallery's collection.

== See also ==
- List of paintings by Sofonisba Anguissola
