= Portrait of Juana of Austria and a Young Girl =

Painting by Sofonisba Anguissola

Portrait of Joanna of Austria with a Young Girl
- Juana of Austria and a Young Girl
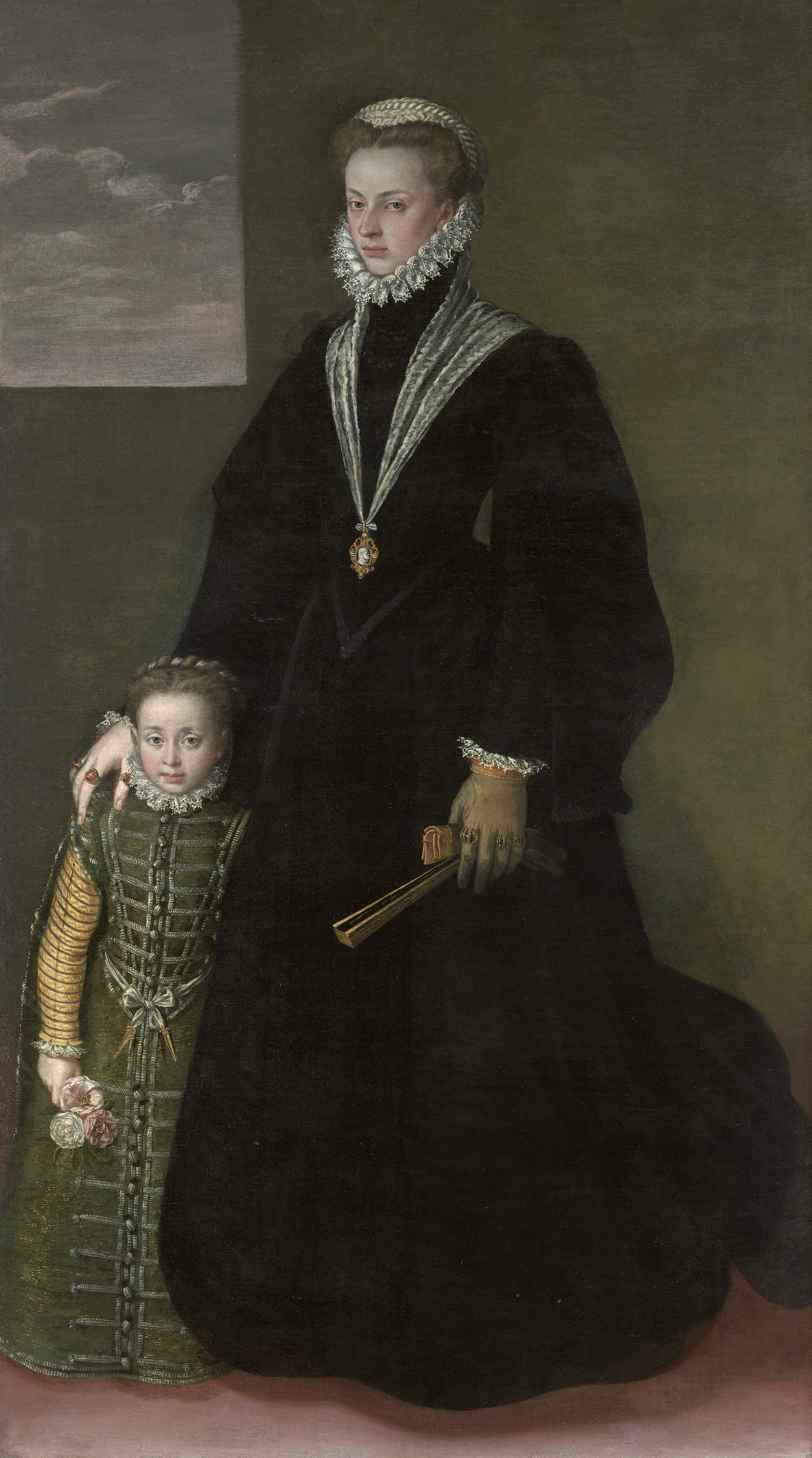
- Year: 1561-1562
- Dimensions: 194 cm (76 in) × 108.3 cm (42.6 in)
- Location: Isabella Stewart Gardner Museum
- Owner: Isabella Stewart Gardner
- Accession no.: P26w15

The Portrait of Juana of Austria and a Young Girl is a full-length portrait executed by the Italian sixteenth-century artist Sofonisba Anguissola. It was one of Anguissola's first paintings after arriving at the Spanish court, where she was official painter to the queen of Spain, Isabel de Valois. In a letter to the artist Bernardo Campi, she said that the painting was for the Pope, who was then Pius IV.

Juana of Austria (1535–1573) was the Queen Regent of Spain, and daughter of the Holy Roman Emperor Charles V.

The Portrait of Juana of Austria and a Young Girl is in the collection of the Isabella Stewart Gardner Museum in Boston, United States.

== See also ==
- List of paintings by Sofonisba Anguissola
