= Portrait of Bianca Ponzoni Anguissola =

Painting by Sofonisba Anguissola

Portrait of Bianca Ponzoni Anguissola, the artist's mother
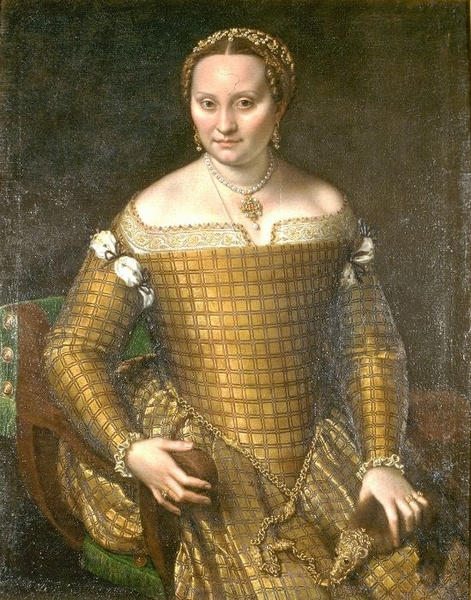
- Artist: Sofonisba Anguissola
- Year: 1557
- Medium: oil on canvas
- Dimensions: 98 cm × 75 cm (39 in × 30 in)
- Location: Gemäldegalerie, Berlin; Berlin

Portrait of Bianca Ponzoni Anguissola or Lady in White is an oil-on canvas-painting created in 1557 by the Italian Renaissance painter Sofonisba Anguissola. It is a portrait of the artist's mother. It is now in the Gemäldegalerie, Berlin. It is securely identified as the artist's mother, since it reuses two elements from The Game of Chess, Lucia's pearl headdress and Minerva/Elena's necklace. Under the arm of the chair are the signature and date “Sophonisba Angussola Virgo F. 15.5.7.”

== See also ==
- List of paintings by Sofonisba Anguissola
