= Anna Maria Anguissola =

Italian painter (c. 1555 – c. 1611)

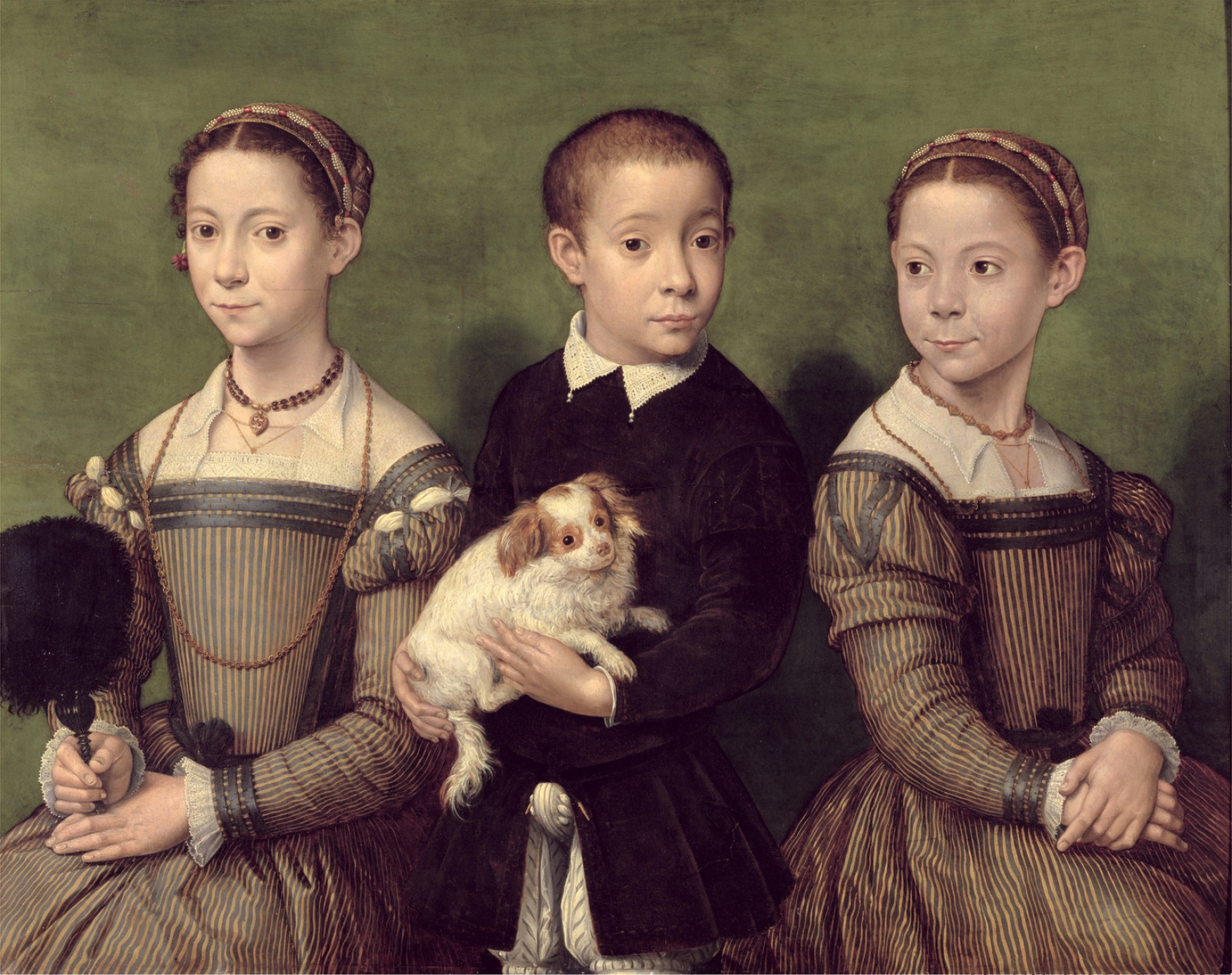
- Three children with dog; oil on panel painting c. 1570–1590
- Born: c. 1555; Cremona, Duchy of Milan
- Died: c. 1611 (aged 55–56)
- Occupation: Painter
- Spouse: Giacomo Sommi (m. 1574; died 1611)
- Relatives: Sofonisba Anguissola (sister); Elena Anguissola (sister); Lucia Anguissola (sister)

Anna Maria Anguissola (c. 1555 – c. 1611) was a 16th-century Italian painter born in Cremona, Italy.

== Biography ==
=== Family ===
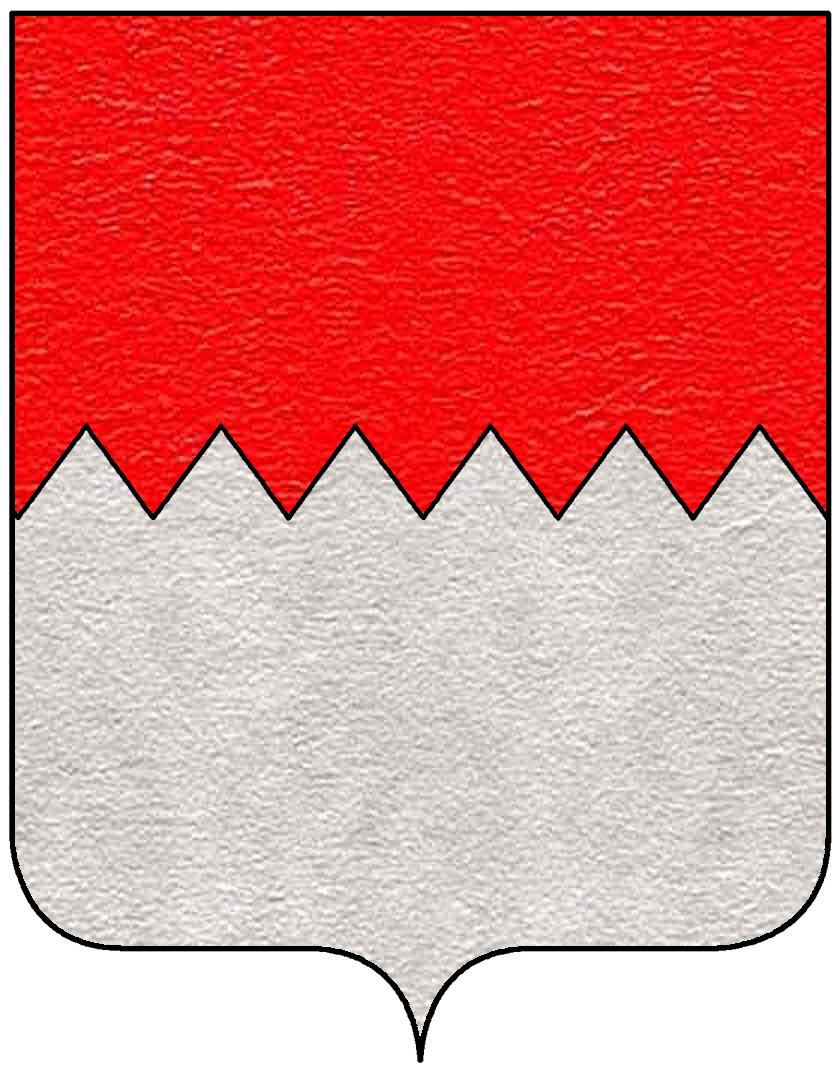
Coat of arms of the Anguissola

Anna was the daughter of Amilcare Anguissola and Bianca Anguissola, wife of Jacobo Sommi, and sister of Elena, Sofonisba, Lucia, Minerva and Europa Anguissola.

=== Life ===
Francesco Zava, her contemporary, hardly mentions her name. She was likely educated in the art of painting by her older sisters. The first document found dates back to 1574, when her documents are requested, because she was promised to her cousin Giacomo Sommi – son of Gaspare – who agrees to marry her with a dowry lower than that which is assigned at that time to a girl of noble condition. The marriage was celebrated in January 1574. Since at that time he could not normally marry her before she was seventeen, her confirmed date of birth cannot be later than 1557.

In 1581 Anna Maria Anguissola was chosen as the godmother of the baptism of Scholastica, daughter of the painter Giovanni Battista Trotti, called Il Malosso. From 1577 to 1591 there are births of twelve of his children, certainly not all survivors. Her husband died in 1611.

Anna Maria Anguissola devoted herself to the portrait and also painted religious subjects. Grasselli remembers having seen, in a private collection in Cremona, a Holy family, painted by Anna Maria Anguissola on the model of the Madonna della Scala di Correggio and a Madonna and Child with Saint John signed and dated: ANNA MARIA VIRGO AMILCARIS ANGUISOLI ET SOPHONIS SOROR SUAE AETATIS ANNORUM QUINDICIM FECIT. She did not have time to characterize herself from the artistic point of view, because she married very young and had many children who absorbed all her attention.

The only known work that bears her signature is a Holy Family with San Francesco, preserved in the Civic Museum of Cremona "Ala Ponzone". Signed and dated ANNAE MARIAE AMILCHARIS ANGUISOLA FILIAE, it shows a certain hardness in the drapery of clothes. In the foreground, the elements of still life and the skull, as well as the basket with grapes and mulberries that the saint holds in his hand, are treated with finesse on the contrary, following the example of Faith Galicia, the coeval Padana painter, specialized in still lifes. A Portrait of a Lady – known as Damia da Paderno, that is, the wife of Giovanni Maria Biffi who was related to Anna Maria Anguissola – is reported by Giovambattista Biffi, in Memoirs to serve the history of the Cremonese artists, as present in the house of the Biffi counts. The country house, called Cà del Pesce, located in San Felice, near Cremona, with all the furnishings was sold in 1820 by Serafino Sommi, a descendant of Anna Maria Anguissola. The portrait is preserved by the owners of this house and was exhibited in 1994–1995 at the exhibition Sofonisba Anguissola and her sisters.

Two dates are painted on this portrait: 1569 on the upper part of the painting and 1568 on the armchair. The young woman is dressed in a severe black velvet dress, from which the collar and cuffs of white lace emerge. He wears rings with badges on his fingers. The flying silver dove, embroidered on the armchair cushion, among rich colored arabesques, is identical to that of the Anguissola family crest.

A Portrait of a Lady, at the Colonna Gallery in Rome, attributed to the Ferrarese Cancellieri, could be the work of Anna Maria Anguissola.
