= Self-Portrait (Sofonisba Anguissola) =

Painting by Sofonisba Anguissola

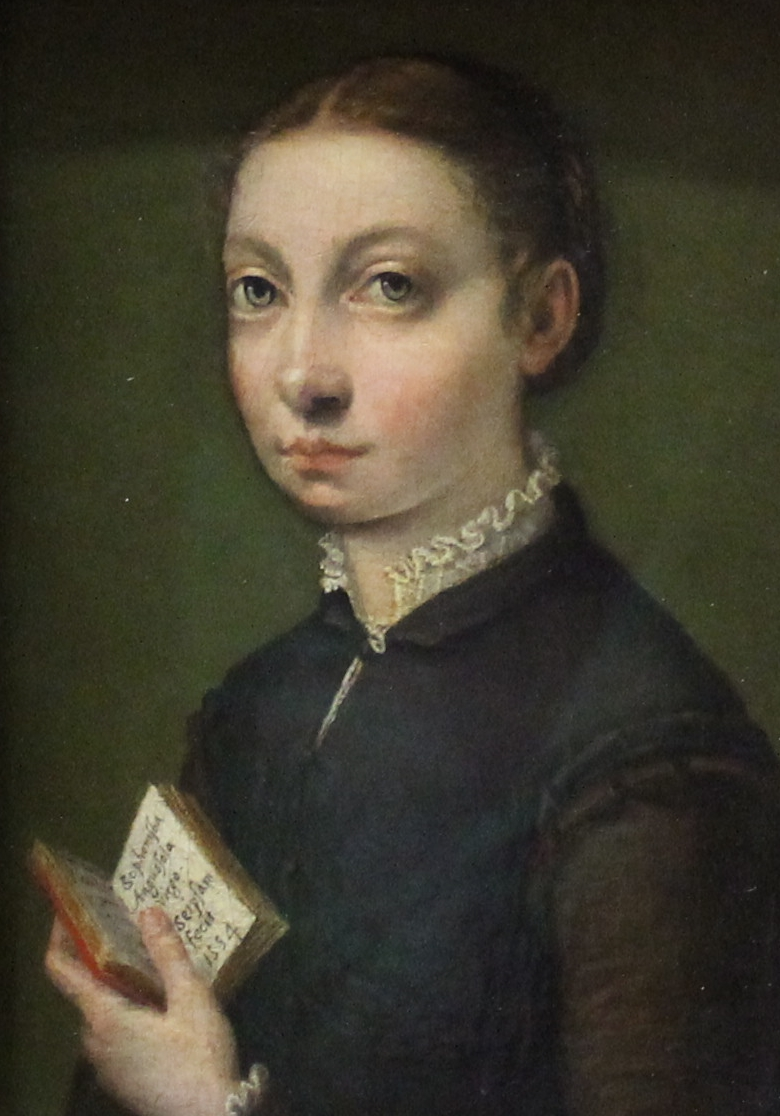
- Artist: Sofonisba Anguissola
- Year: 1554
- Medium: oil on panel
- Dimensions: 19.5 cm × 12.5 cm (7.7 in × 4.9 in)
- Location: Kunsthistorisches Museum, Vienna

Self-Portrait is a small oil-on-panel painting by the Italian artist Sofonisba Anguissola, signed and dated 1554 on the open book held by the artist. The portrait is now in the Kunsthistorisches Museum, in Vienna.

It was recorded as hanging in Vienna's Belvedere Gallery, already attributed to Anguissola but initially thought to be a portrait of infanta Isabella Clara Eugenia on her betrothal to her cousin Albert VII, Archduke of Austria which had therefore ended up in Vienna. Flavio Carioli also came to this conclusion, but in 1885 Adolfo Venturi cited a letter sent to Ercole II d'Este, Duke of Ferrara in March 1556 by Anguissola's father with two paintings by her, a self-portrait intended for the duke's daughter Lucrezia and a Cleopatra (after a drawing by Michelangelo, probably a folio now in the Casa Buonarroti). Venturi also recorded that in 1603–1604 cardinal Alessandro d'Este gave some of his paintings to Rudolf II, Holy Roman Emperor. Though no inventory of the paintings given to Rudolf survives, Venturi theorises that this self-portrait was one of them and the theory is accepted by all other art historians.

== Description ==
The portrait is notably simple, with the dress worn being modest and with the subject not wearing any jewellery.

The date is only one year earlier than that of The Game of Chess by the same painter, but at first sight this portrait seems to belong to a much more immature artistic phase. Some imperfections are also due to an old cleaning, which was too vigorous and as a result removed the glazes. Anguissola's father, in sending the gift to Duke Ercole d'Este, apologized for certain inaccuracies, due to the fact that the portrait had been created looking in the mirror: in fact the hand seems slightly deformed. Sofonisba wears the same dress and has the same hairstyle and expression in her Self-Portrait at a Spinet, kept in Naples.

== See also ==
- List of paintings by Sofonisba Anguissola
