= The Game of Chess (Sofonisba Anguissola) =

Painting by Sofonisba Anguissola

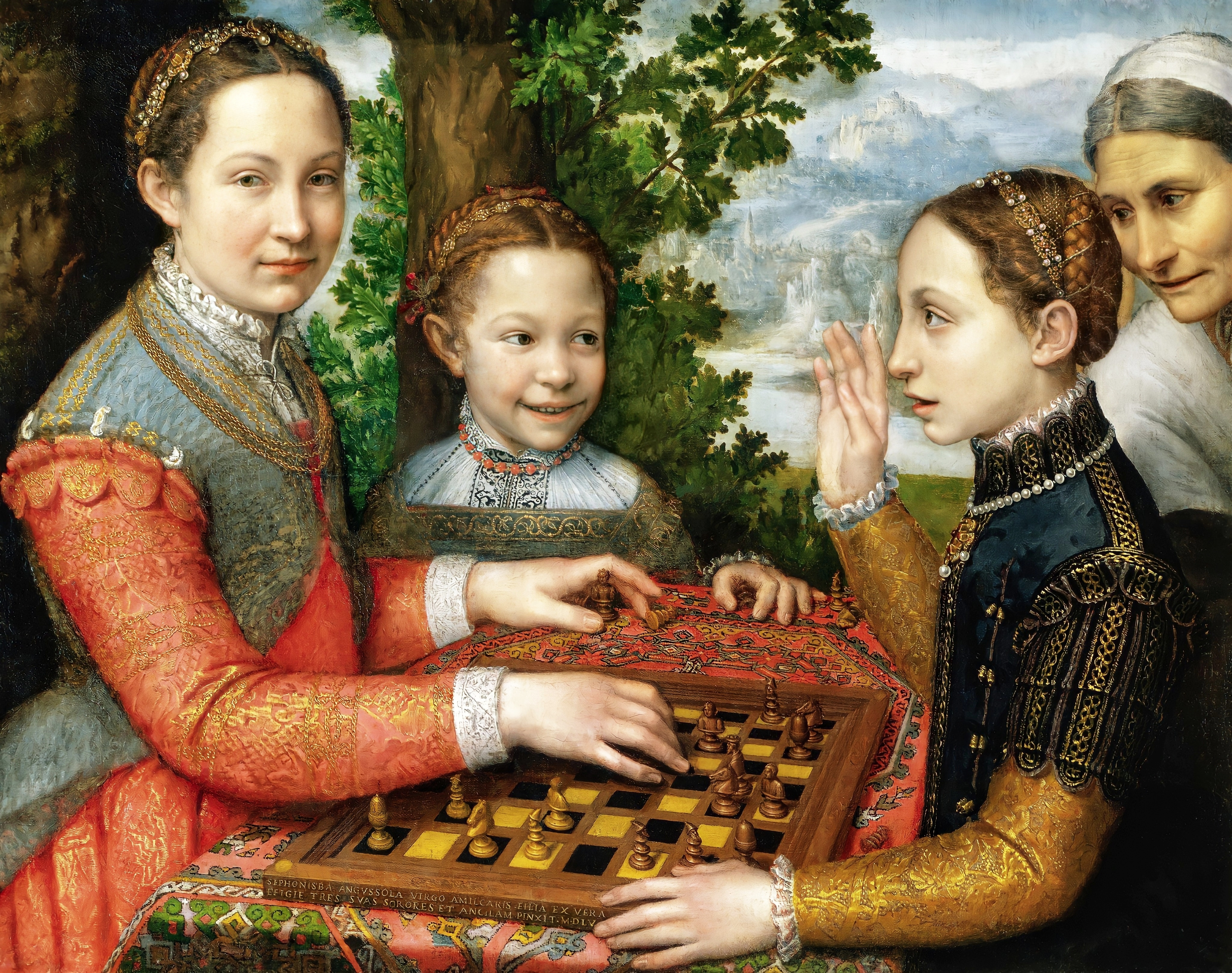
- Artist: Sofonisba Anguissola
- Year: c. 1555
- Medium: oil on canvas
- Dimensions: 72 cm × 97 cm (28 in × 38 in)
- Location: National Museum in Poznań, Poznań

The Game of Chess (also known as Portrait of the Artist's Sisters Playing Chess) is an oil-on-canvas painting created around 1555 by the Italian Renaissance artist Sofonisba Anguissola. Anguissola was 23 years old when she created the painting, which is now housed at the National Museum in Poznań, Poland.

The painting features three of Sofonisba Anguissola's sisters: Lucia (left), Europa (middle), and Minerva (right), and an unnamed housemaid (top right). It is signed and dated on the edge of the chessboard, where Anguissola left the following inscription in Latin: SOPHONISBA ANGUSSOLA VIRGO AMILCARIS FILIA EX VERA EFFIGIE TRES SUAS SORORES ET ANCILLAM PINXIT MDLV – "Sofonisba Angussola, virgin daughter of Amilcare, painted from life her three sisters and a maid, 1555.

== Composition ==
Set in a casual, domestic setting, The Game of Chess depicts the three sisters in an agreeable garden with a large, branch-laden oak tree, symbolizing the strength of family bonds. Lucia (left), the third born of the Anguissola children, is depicted in the act of moving a pawn on the chessboard. Minerva (right), the fourth born, is seated across the table from Lucia and raises her hand in protest against her adversary. Europa (middle), who is the fifth-born, stands in the middle of the composition, behind the chessboard, following the game while laughing. In the upper right, a housemaid watches the game from between the sisters, with a light blue Flemish-style mountainscape appearing in the distance.

The housemaid’s modest appearance stands in stark contrast to the Anguissola sisters, who are adorned with pearls, jewelry, embroidered clothing, and elaborate hairstyles. Minerva Anguissola wears the same necklace as her mother in the Portrait of Bianca Ponzoni Anguissola, painted by Sofonisba in 1557.

== History ==
Engraving by an unknown artist

In 1556, during his visit to Cremona, Giorgio Vasari saw the painting on display in the home of Amilcare Aguissola. Of the painting he wrote, "I have seen this year in Cremona, in the house of her father a painting made with much diligence, the depiction of his three daughters, in the act of playing chess, and with them an old housemaid, done with such diligence and facility, that they appear alive, and the only thing missing is speech." This is the earliest known document to mention the painting, which remained on display in the Anguissola family home for several years.

Once The Game of Chess arrived in Rome, together with the Self Portrait at a Spinet and two additional drawings by Anguissola (Child Bitten by a Lobster and another unidentified drawing), it was placed in the collection of humanist and collector Fulvio Orsini. The painting was then inherited by Cardinal Odoardo Farnese, followed by the House of Bourbon, and finally Luciano Bonaparte, before reaching its final destination at the National Museum in Poznań, Poland. The artist made several alterations to the painting, from which three known engravings are derived. The painting has undergone evident repaintings.

=== Chess and gender in the Italian Reniassance ===
The painting's portrayal of an all-female chess game is unusual because during the Italian Renaissance, chess was seen as a masculine pursuit meant to display the player's martial skills. Chess experienced a major development during the late 15th-century when the queen became the most powerful piece on the board, causing the game to be referred to as 'woman's chess' and 'mad chess' during the Renaissance period in Italy. Chess has been associated with war and intellect since the Medieval period in Europe and was commonly played between men of the ruling class.

=== Female servants in Italian Renaissance paintings ===
Though the servant in The Game of Chess is slightly cropped, her presence in the scene serves an important purpose. During the sixteenth century, older female servants were frequently depicted in Renaissance portraits, highlighting the nobility of the main figure. The servant's yellowed-skin, wrinkled forehead, and all-white clothing stand in clear contrast to the Anguissola's.

=== Portrayal of women playing chess ===
The extravagant, “queenly attire” of the three Anguissola sisters suggests that Sofonisba Anguissola is not recreating a specific game of chess between the sisters. The luxurious costume connects to the domestic traditions of embroidery or weaving. By portraying this group immersed in an activity completely different from the normal skills that were vital to a girl's education during this time period, Anguissola shows these young women in a new realm.

The Game of Chess features an all-female group. Anguissola includes her sisters and maidservant in this composition but excludes her younger brother, Asdrubale. The fully female cast is unlike many of the sixteenth-century artworks featuring games of chess that preceded it, like Giulio Campi’s The Chess Game or Lucas van Leyden’s Chess Game. Chess was part of the humanistic education and was considered an excellent intellectual exercise in contrast to card and dice games, which were forbidden to women. These were based on luck and not on intelligence. Anguissola's work acts as a "self-celebration of women's accomplishments and talent" for how it challenges past "exclu[sions of] women from the representation of chess and an intellectual pursuit."

According to an old tradition, the chess alluded to a Battle of the Amazons. In his poem from 1550 entitled Scacchia Ludus (or The Game of Chess), the Cremonese poet and bishop of Alba, Marco Gerolamo Vida, sometimes called the queen virgo and sometimes amazon and said that it can move in any direction. The queens had the possibility of being resurrected from a pawn. In the final section Vida mentions a battle between two queens, in which the white queen dies and rises again. At the end, the black queen checkmates the white. The battle painted by Anguissola alludes to the search for a conquering woman. With this, the chessboard becomes an allegory and the true queens are the two Anguissola sisters, then spend their life virtuously, taking part in an educational exercise.

== Legacy ==
The Chess Game is considered a seminal piece of feminist history and Renaissance art. The picture questioned the traditional depiction of women as ornamental or passive characters by showing them involved in a contemplative, intellectual activity. Anguissola challenged gender norms and emphasized women's intelligence by depicting them as active players in a strategic game, which is uncommon in Renaissance painting. In a time when male artists dominated, her work not only affirmed women's agency but also helped to increase awareness of women's contributions to both art and society. By offering an early illustration of how women may use art to assert their intellectual and creative autonomy, Anguissola's legacy had an impact on the feminist movement. The Chess Game, which showed that female painters could attain both artistic competence and question social norms around gender, has been highlighted by scholars as having contributed to the foundation for subsequent feminist reappraisals of Renaissance art.

== See also ==
- List of paintings by Sofonisba Anguissola
