= Miniature Self-Portrait (Anguissola, Boston) =

Painting by Sofonisba Anguissola

Miniature Self Portrait
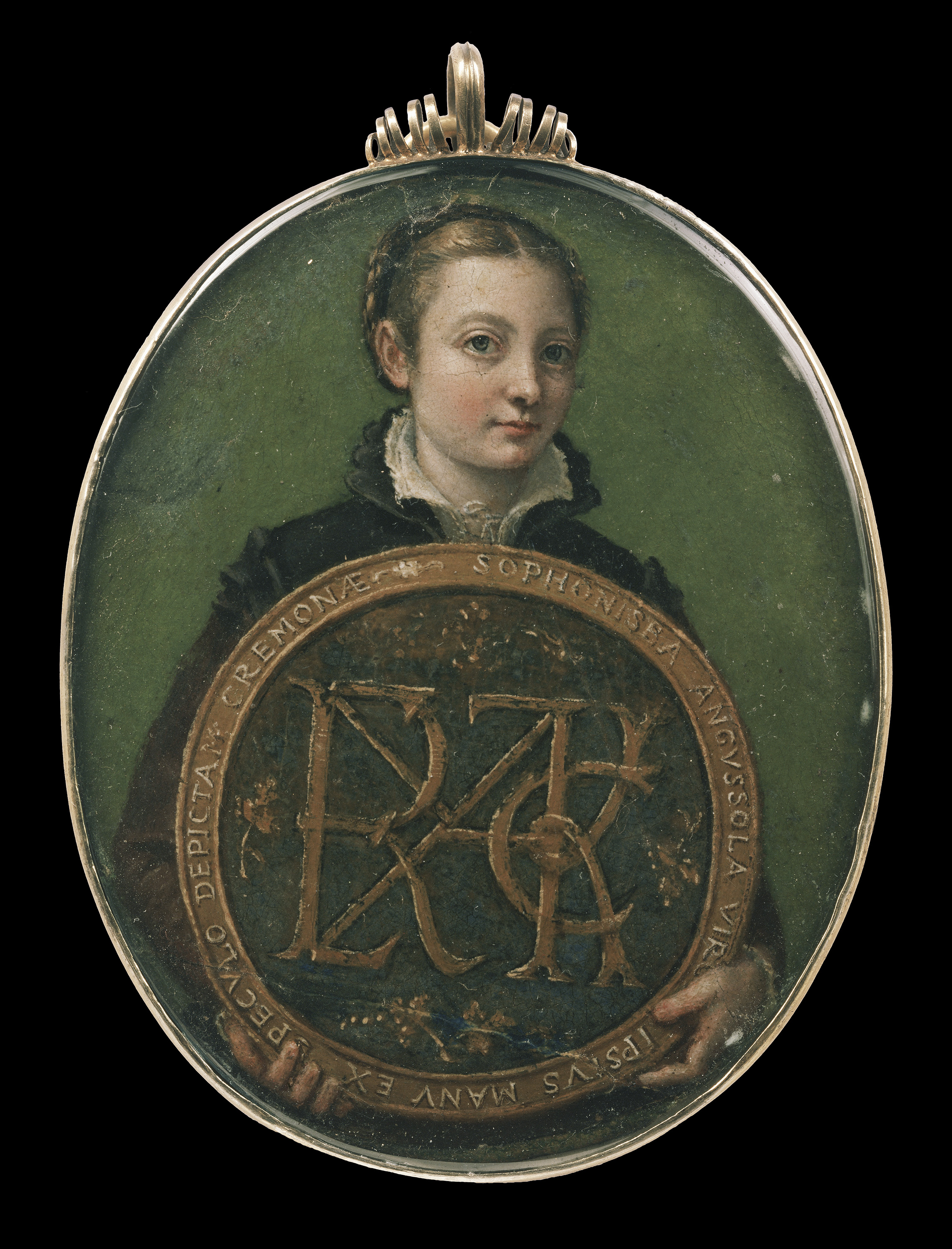
- Artist: Sofonisba Anguissola
- Year: c. 1556
- Medium: oil paint on parchment
- Location: Museum of Fine Arts, Boston

Miniature Self-Portrait is the smaller of two known surviving miniature self-portraits by skilled portraitist Sofonisba Anguissola (c. 1532–1625). Painted c. 1556, this small oil on parchment on cardboard is set in a metal frame with a scroll surmount. The choice of format is based on Anguissola's knowledge of the works of the celebrated Italian Renaissance miniaturist Giulio Clovio (1498–1578), as well as virtuous self-fashioning, and the Renaissance taste for puzzles. The painting is in the permanent collection of the Museum of Fine Arts, in Boston.

== Description ==
This complex oval miniature portrait is just over three inches in height, and is delicately painted with the tip of the brush on a weathered green background. It depicts a three-quarter self portrait of Anguissola looking at the viewer while holding a prominently featured roundel containing a monogram in the lower two-thirds of the painting. This composition was unique among contemporary miniatures which would incorporate the sitter's head and shoulders, but rarely objects. As the artist commonly depicted herself, she is dressed in an austere black dress with a raised white embroidered collar, and her hair is in tresses and gathered around her head. Circling the monogram there is the following inscription, painted in Latin capital letters: SOPHONISBA ANGUSSOLA VIR(GO) IPSIUS MANU EX (S)PECULO DEPICTAM CREMONAE ("The maiden Sofonisba Anguissola, depicted by her own hand, from a mirror, at Cremona).

== History ==
As a minor Cremonise nobleman, Anguissola's father, Amilcare, used his status to procure an education for Sofonisba and her sister Elena with a local prominent painter named Bernardino Campi. Amilcare promoted Sofonisba's portraits by sharing them with wealthy patrons and dignitaries to show her portraiture, and by the time she was in her twenties, she had created a reputation for her skills and her beauty.

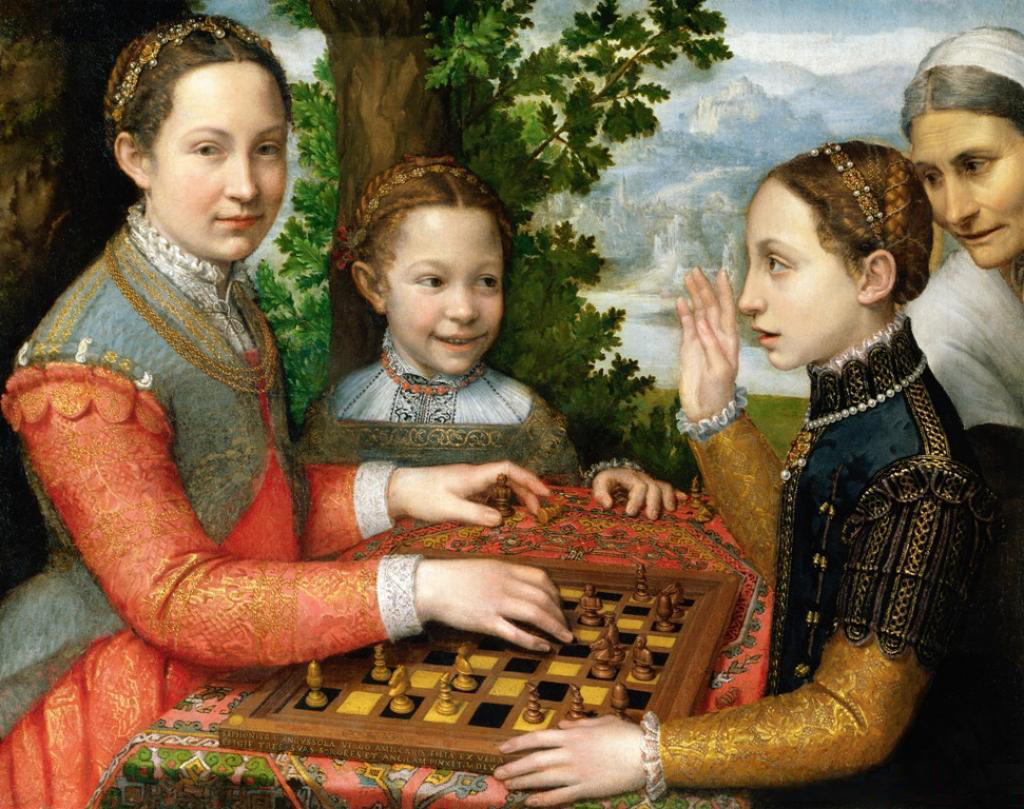
The Chess Game (1555). Oil on canvas, 72 × 97 cm (28 × 38 in). National Museum in Poznań, Poland. Depicting Lucia (left), Minerva (right) and Europa (middle) Anguissola playing chess.

Women of high status and nobility were obligated to meet certain standards of skill and personal traits to maintain their noble distinction in society, as made popular by Italian Renaissance writer, Baldassare Castiglione. In his book, Cortegiano (The Book of the Courtier, 1528), Castiglione clearly outlines the qualities that women of this period and social strata should strive to have: knowledge of literature and painting, musical proficiency with gender appropriate instruments, comprehension of current fashionable games and dances, and proper attire to display modesty and beauty while also avoiding the appearance of vanity or frivolity. In her portraits, Anguissola self-fashions herself as meeting these standards with depictions of herself holding books, painting, playing a piano, and having knowledge of the game chess. She further displays her virtue by including the Latin word "Virgo" (virgin) in many of her works to incorporate her purity status, a socially necessary precaution of a noble lady to maintain family standing and honor, which were of the utmost importance to the reputation of a noble Renaissance family.

== Beauty standards in the 16th century ==
Anguissola had the rare ability to control her own image through painting. The physiognomy of this miniature is typical of the self-portraits in which she self-fashioned herself dressed simply in black dresses, and pristine undershirts with white lace collars as a confirmation of her modesty and virtue. The austerity of her clothing and lack of ornamentation serve to highlight her natural beauty and features. Befitting the beauty standards of the day, the artist depicts herself with golden hair, a fresh, fair-skinned face with dewy cheeks, and a forehead that is well proportioned with its height being half of its width. She has round dark eyes framed by natural brows of fine hair, a straight nose that pinkens at its tip, a delicately dimpled chin, feminine lips, and small curved ears. Sprezzatura, as described by Castiglione, was the notion of excelling at something without effort; being an attractive woman without fuss, makeup, or being overly adorned, was a prized characteristic and prominent feature of Anguissola's self-portraits.

In his book The Ornaments of Ladies, (Venice, 1562), Giovanni Marinello provides women with tips on health, beauty, and personality, serving to remind women of the Renaissance that the condition of their hair, face, and body is related to their desired and expected roles in society. This and other Renaissance writings, like Castiglione's Cortegiano, offer extremely narrow standards of femininity and beauty of which Anguissola was surely aware. Her talent and renowned beauty were often intertwined. In correspondence with her father, poet Annibale Caro (1507–1566) wrote, "There is nothing I desire more than the image of the artist herself, so that in a single work I can display two marvels, one the work, the other the artist." A 1554 letter from painter Francesco Salviati to Anguissola's teacher, Bernadino Campi, refers to his pupil as "the beautiful Cremonese painter."

== Provenance ==
The provenance of Anguissola's miniature self-portrait was unknown until 1801, when it appeared in the Richard Gough (1735–1809) collection in London where it was sold by art dealers, Leigh and Sotheby, July 19–21, 1810, lot 322. By 1862, the work was in the collection of Henry Danby Seymour (1820–1877), and on loan to the South Kensington Museum (now Victoria and Albert Museum) where the painting remained even as ownership was passed down by descent to his niece, Miss Jane Margaret Seymour (1873–1943). It remained on loan to the Victoria and Albert Museum until May 9, 1928, when the painting was again sold by Sotheby's, London, lot 61. On November 9, 1959, the painting was sold anonymously from "the property of a lady" by Sotheby's, London, lot 28, to F. Kleinberger Galleries in New York (stock no. F1375). In 1960, it was sold by F. Kleinberger Galleries to the MFA for $3,000; accession date to the collection was March 10, 1960.

The painting is in the permanent collection of the Museum of Fine Arts, in Boston.

== Scholarly debate ==
=== Monogram ===
The undeciphered interwoven letters at the center of the monogram have garnered scholarly debate. Anguissola's gaze and slight smile at the viewer have been interpreted as an invitation to decipher her message, and lends to the self-portrait's mystery. Art historian, Ann Sutherland Harris, believed the monogram denotes the name of her father, Amilcare, with only the letters A, C, E, I, L, M and R present. Liana De Girolami Cheney suggested the letters stood for the motto "Anguissola Familia Pittrice Cremonese", referring to the Anguissola Family of Painters in Cremona and alluding to the Anguissola family's artistic ancestry. Art historian Patrizia Costa argues it is a nod to Anguissola's noble ancestry. Costa deciphers the Latin phrase Anguis sola fecit victoriam (the snake alone brought victory) as a motto in monogram form recalling the legend of the victorious battles against the Saracens by Galvano Sourdi, who was later given the surname Anguissola (based on the Latin word anguis, 'snake'), as seen on her family crest. Further, Costa believes the Renaissance taste for puzzles would have piqued interest in this work, and would have shown the intelligence of the painter. Costa suggests it would have pleased her miniaturist teacher, Giulio Clovio, who studied and practiced monograms in cifre quadrate (square digits).

=== Anguissola's skill in miniature painting ===
Because there are only two surviving miniatures by Anguissola, (the other, Self-portrait, is held at the Uffizi in Florence, Italy), little is known for certain about Anguissola's miniature works. Documents suggest she was a miniature painting educator while she was in Palermo. Neapolitan historian Onofrio Giannone verifies an earlier account by Bernardo de' Domincini (1683–1758) which stated that Anguissola taught miniaturist Giovanni Battista Anticone while she lived in Sicily. Further, there is evidence that Anguissola also taught miniature techniques to Pietro Francesco Piola (1565–1600) while in Genoa.

It is known for certain that Anguissola taught her sisters to paint before she was called to the Spanish court to be a lady-in-waiting, portraitist, and painting instructor to King Philip II's third wife, the young Queen Isabel de Valois.

=== Intended recipient ===
It is difficult to know for certain since the work was unaccounted for until its auction in 1810 as part of the Gough Collection, but two possibilities seem likely. Because her father, Amilcare, was very active in finding patronage for his daughter's work, it is possible this miniature was produced as a portable example of the quality of her work, beauty, and intelligence.

A second theory is that this was produced for Clovio, her miniaturist teacher. After his death, his last will and testament provides a record of his belongings which included two self-portraits of former students, Levina Teerlinc (miniaturist to Queen Elizabeth I) and Giovanna Clavio, a German student who travelled to Rome to be his pupil in 1540. It is not improbable that Clovio enjoyed collecting the works of his pupils, such as this example displaying Anguissola's expert skills.

== See also ==
- List of paintings by Sofonisba Anguissola
