= Elena Anguissola =

Italian artist (c. 1532–1584)

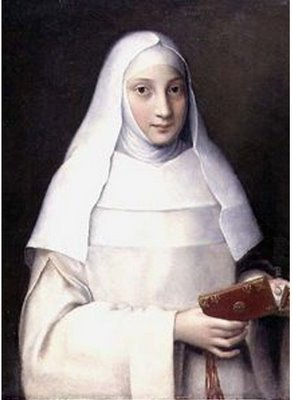
- Portrait of Elena Anguissola by Sofonisba Anguissola, 1551
- Born: c. 1532; Cremona, Duchy of Milan
- Died: 1584 (aged 51–52); Mantua, Duchy of Mantua
- Education: Bernardino Campi; Bernardino Gatti
- Movement: Late Renaissance
- Relatives: Sofonisba Anguissola (sister); Lucia Anguissola (sister); Anna Maria Anguissola (sister)

Elena Anguissola (also Angosciola or Angussola; c. 1532 – 1584) was an Italian painter and nun. She was the sister of the better-known painter Sofonisba Anguissola.

== Biography ==
Elena Anguissola (who became a nun with the name of Sister Minerva) was the daughter of Amilcare Anguissola and Bianca Ponzoni. Her sisters included Sofonisba, Lucia, Anna Maria and Minerva, and she had one brother, Asdrubale.

Her parents were of noble origins. Her father belonged to the Genoese nobility and had moved to Lombardy. With his family, Amilcare Anguissola lived in Cremona, in a building on Via Pellegrino Tibaldi. He taught all of his children a humanistic culture, with readings of Latin and Italian texts, and painting for the eldest daughters Elena and Sofonisba, under the guidance of Bernardino Campi (1522–1591). They lived for three years in the house of Campi and in 1546, when the painter left Cremona and moved to Milan, Sofonisba Anguissola became the painting teacher of her younger sisters. This is the first case documented in Italy of girls sent to live at the home of a painter to accommodate their inclination towards art, as well as the first Italian family with painter sisters.

In 1550 Elena and Sofonisba (the older sisters) passed into the workshop of Bernardino Gatti, called the Sojaro. They specialized in portraiture and also took inspiration from the art of Moretto da Brescia and the mannerism of the Spanish portrait. The two sisters went to Mantua, where they were received at the Gonzaga court. In 1566 Giorgio Vasari arrived in Cremona and, as a guest in the Anguissola house, marveled at the art of the sisters. Elena retired to the convent of San Vincenzo in Mantua as a Dominican nun, taking the name of Sister Minerva (not to be confused with her younger sister called Minerva). Her name is mentioned in a letter of 1557, written by her father to the Duchess of Mantua and in her brother's will, dated 1575. Perhaps it is her Portrait of the Dominican as Saint Catherine of Siena – it could be her self-portrait – kept in the Galleria Borghese in Rome.

Portrait of a nun by Sofonisba Anguissola, signed and dated 1551, is thought to be a portrait of Elena, in the guise of Sister Minerva. The novice nun holds a book in her hand, lined with red leather and with gold friezes.

== Bibliography ==
- Catalog of the exhibition held in Cremona in 1994, in Vienna and in Washington in 1995.
