= List of paintings by Sofonisba Anguissola =

The following is a list of paintings by Sofonisba Anguissola that are generally accepted as autograph.

Image	Title	Date	Collection	Inventory number	Ref
	Portrait of Elena Anguissola	1540s or 1551	Southampton City Art Gallery, UK		
	Self-portrait	1550	Uffizi, Florence		
	Self-portrait	c.1550	Private collection		
	Self-portrait	1554	Kunsthistorisches Museum, Vienna	GG_285	
	Self-portrait	1554	Museo Poldi Pezzoli, Milan		
	Self-Portrait at a Spinet	1554	Museo Nazionale di Capodimonte, Naples		
	Portrait of the Artist's Sisters Playing Chess	1555	National Museum Poznań	FR 434	
	Self-portrait at the Easel Painting a Devotional Panel	1556	Łańcut Castle, Poland		
	Portrait of a Monk	1556	private collection Herbert Cook		
	Miniature Self-Portrait	1556	Museum of Fine Arts, Boston	60.155	
	Julio Clovio, master of artistic miniatures	1556	Private collection		
	Portrait of Marquess Massimiliano Stampa	1557	Walters Art Museum, Baltimore, MD	37.1016	
	Portrait of Bianca Ponzoni Anguissola, the artist's mother	1557	Gemäldegalerie, Berlin		
	Giovanni Battista Caselli, Cremona poet	1558	Museo del Prado, Madrid		
	Portrait Group with the Artist's Father, Brother and Sister	1559	Nivaagaard, Denmark	0001NMK	
	Self-portrait	1559	Private collection		
	Holy Family: Rest on the Way to Egypt	1559	Accademia Carrara, Bergamo, Italy		
	Portrait of a man (Garcia Urtavo de Mendoza)	c.1560	Private collection		
	Portrait of Joanna of Austria	1560s	Private collection		
	Prince Alessandro Farnese (1545-1592), later Duke of Parma and Piacenza	1560	National Gallery of Ireland, Dublin	NGI.17	
	Portrait of Juana of Austria with a Young Girl	1561	Isabella Stewart Gardner Museum, Boston, Massachusetts	P26w15	
	Portrait of Elisabeth of Valois holding a portrait of Philip II	1563	Museo del Prado, Madrid	P01031	
	Minerva, sister of the artist	1564	Milwaukee Art Museum	S103	
	Portrait of Diane d'Andouins and her daughter	1565	Musée Basque, Bayonne, France	G 2	
	Portrait of a Young Aristocrat	1565	Private collection		
	Portrait of Infanta Carlos, son of Philip II of Spain and Mary of Portugal	1565	Private collection		
	Portrait of a Boy at the Spanish Court	1567s	San Diego Museum of Art	1936.58	
	Virgin and Child	1570s	Statens Museum for Kunst, Copenhagen	KMSsp77	
	Portrait of Minerva Anguissola	1570s	Pinacoteca di Brera, Milan		
	Portrait of a Couple	1570	Doria Pamphilj Gallery, Rome		
	Portrait of Philip II of Spain	1573	Museo del Prado, Madrid	P01036	
	Portrait of Anna of Austria 1549-1580)	1573	Museo del Prado, Madrid	P01284	
	Isabella Clara Eugene	1573	Galleria Sabauda, Turin, Italy		
	Dona Maria Manrique de Lara with her daughter	1584	Kinský Palace (Prague), Czech Republic		
	Madonna and Child by candlelight (Luca Cambiaso as Madonna)	1575	Palazzo Bianco (Genoa), Italy		
	Madonna dell'Itria	1578	Church of the Santissima Annunziata, Paterno`, Sicily		Identified by Alfio Nicotra (1995) with documentation (2002). Tale of Two Women Painters, Museo del Prado 2019
	Portrait of Francesco I de' Medici, Grand Duke of Tuscany (1541-1587)	1579	private collection		
	Portrait of Maximilian II of Austria	1580	Private collection		
	Infanta Catalina, granddaughter of the duke and duchess of Parma	1580	Maidstone Museum, Kent, England		
	Portrait of a Young Woman in Profile	1580s	Hermitage Museum, St. Petersburg	ГЭ-36	
	A Man with his Daughter	1580s	National Museum, Warsaw	M.Ob.1079 (130953)	
	Three Children with a Dog	1580s	private collection		
	Portrait of a Young Patrician	1580s-1590s	Lviv National Art Gallery		
	Portrait of a Young Lady	1580	Museum of Lázaro Galdiano	08486	
	Infanta Catalina Michaela of Austria	1585	Museo del Prado, Madrid		
	Portrait of a woman (Elizabeth French)	1590	Musée Condé, Chantilly, France	PE 100	
	Portrait of a Child with Flowers	1590	Private Collection		
	Portrait of Giuliano Cesarini	1586	private collection		
	Portrait of a Child	c. 1590	Private collection		
	Girl with a Dwarf (Portrait of Margarita of Savoy)	1595	Private collection		
	Infanta Isabella Clara Eugenia	1598	Museo del Prado, Madrid		
	Madonna and Child	1598	Museum of Fine Arts (Budapest), Hungary		
	Portrait of Queen Elisabeth of Spain (1545-1568)	1599?	Kunsthistorisches Museum, Vienna	GG_3351	
	Portrait of Isabella di Savoie	1600	Private collection		
	Portrait of Donna Giovanna of Austria with a fan in her hands	c.1600	Private collection		
	Saint Lucia	c.1600	private collection		
	Pieta	1600	Pinacoteca di Brera, Milan		
	Portrait of Donna Juana of Austria	1603	Private collection		
	Self-portrait in old age	1610	Gottfried Keller-Stiftung		

== Sources ==
- Sofonisba Anguissola e le sue sorelle, Centro Culturale, Cremona, 6 September - 11 December 1994, ISBN 978-8878135123
- Sofonisba Anguissola in the RKD
