= Self-Portrait at a Spinet =

Painting by Sofonisba Anguissola

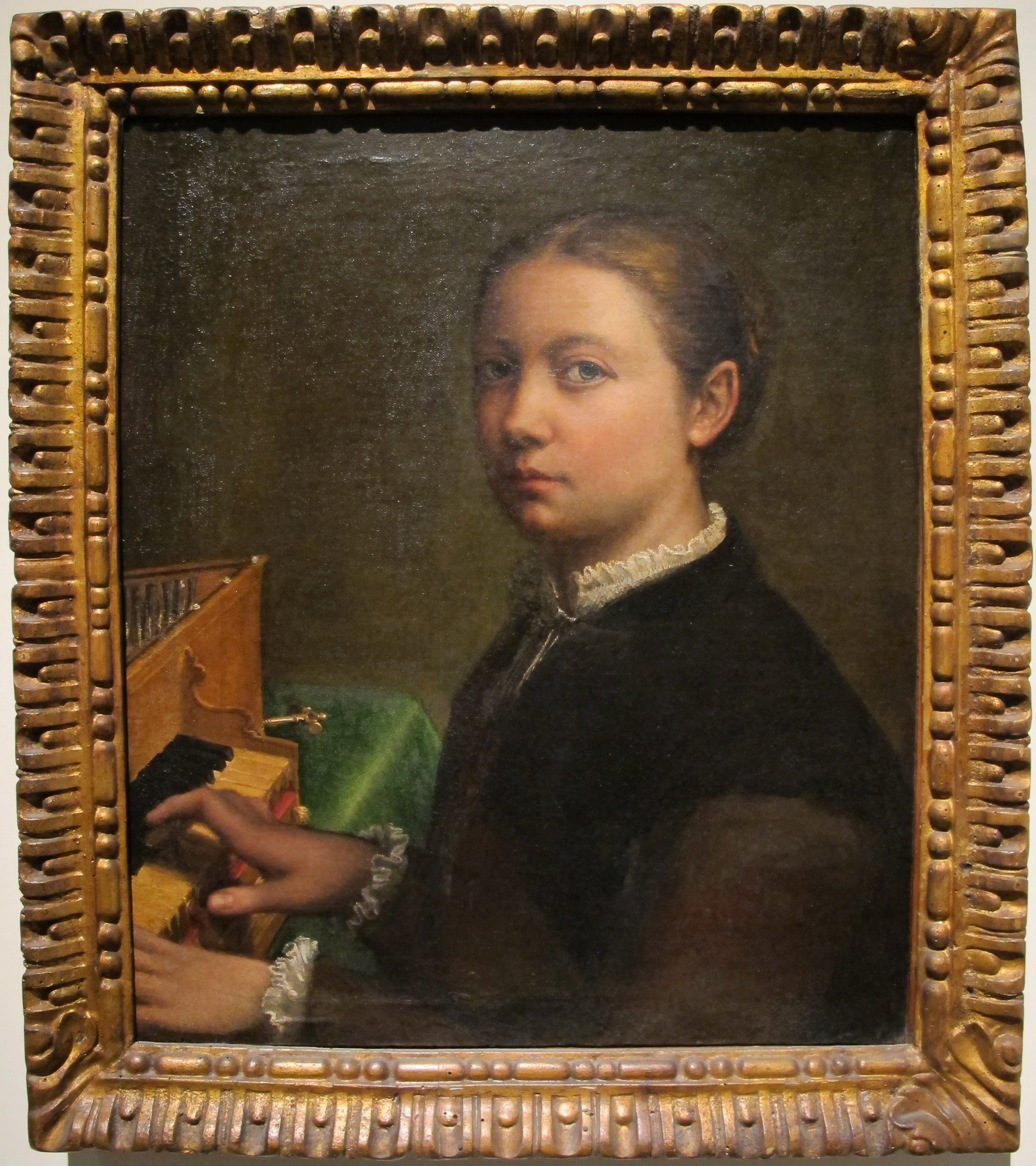
- Artist: Sofonisba Anguissola
- Year: c. 1555
- Medium: oil on canvas
- Dimensions: 2,526 cm × 2,844 cm (994 in × 1,120 in)
- Location: National Museum of Capodimonte; Naples

Self-Portrait at a Spinet is an oil-on-canvas painting by the Italian artist Sofonisba Anguissola, from c. 1555. It is held in the National Museum of Capodimonte, in Naples.

It was in cardinal Fulvio Orsini's collection, which passed to Odoardo Farnese in 1600. Orsini's collection also included Anguissola's Partita and two drawings by her.

== See also ==
- List of paintings by Sofonisba Anguissola

== Bibliography ==
- Mina Gregori (coordinator), I Campi: cultura artistica cremonese del Cinquecento, Milan, Electa, 1985 (Italian), SBN IT\ICCU\PAL\0002579.
- Flavio Caroli, Sofonisba Anguissola e le sue sorelle, Milan, A. Mondadori, 1987 (Italian), SBN IT\ICCU\CFI\0111864.
- AA VV, Sofonisba Anguissola e le sue sorelle, Milan, Leonardo arte, 1994, catalogue of an exhibition (Italian)
