= Massimiliano II Stampa =

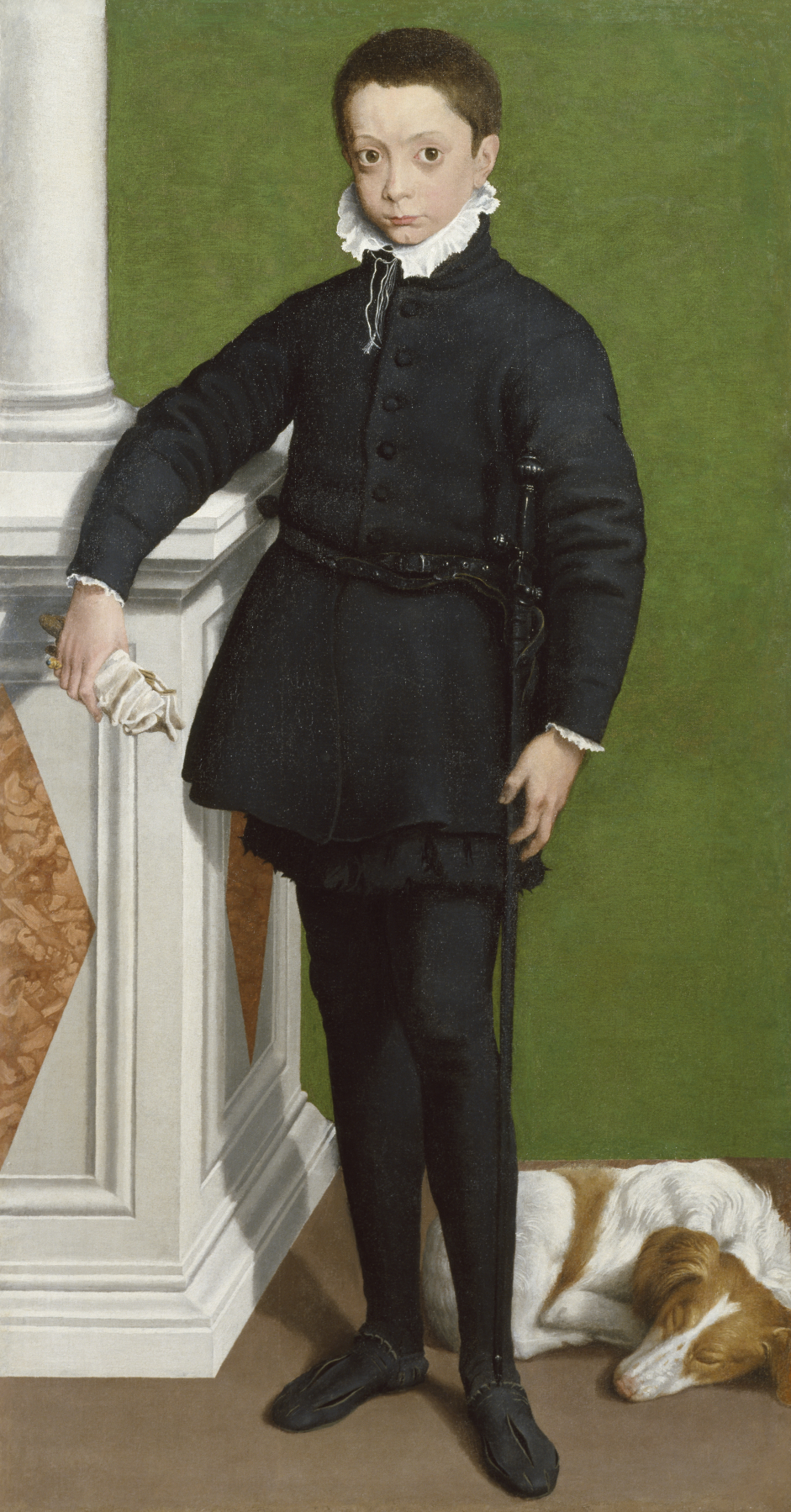
Portrait of Massimiliano II Stampa by Sofonisba Anguissola

Massimiliano II Giovanni Stampa, 3rd marquess of Soncino (1545 – 1601) was an Italian nobleman and writer of the Stampa family, also known after his profession as a Capuchin friar as frate or fra Ambrogio da Soncino.

== Life ==
=== Early years ===
He was born in Milan to Isabella Rangoni (a noblewoman from Modena) and her husband Ermes I Stampa, 2nd marquess of Soncino and younger brother of Massimiliano Stampa, 1st marquess of Soncino and noted castellan of Milan). Via his mother he was descended from a famous family of condottieri and he also boasted links with the Bentivoglio family, lords of Bologna, and with the Malaspina family. His father's family, by contrast, was mainly made up of 'new men' from the duchy of Milan, where his uncle the 1st marquess had made his fortune.

He succeeded his father's titles on his premature death in 1557. In Milan he married Marianna de Leyva, whose brother was father to the famous Virginia de Leyva. With her he had:

- Ermes II (1563-1621), 4th marquess of Soncino, married the noblewoman Elisabetta Barbò
- Cristiano (anche Cristierno) Stampa (1575-1617), married the noblewoman Francesca Guasco; knight of the Order of Saint James of Compostela and origin of the Stampa di Montecastello line, died during the siege of Vercelli
- Giorgio (1578-1625), Carmelite friar known as Angelo di Gesù Maria
- Guido, Carmelite friar
- Luigi, knight of the Order of Saint James of Compostela
- Barbara, married Francesco Alciati
- Caterina, Discalced Carmelite nun
- Teresa, Discalced Carmelite nun

In 1575 he made generous donations to the library in Soncino and gave enough for the city to build a Capuchin monastery. On 25 August 1579 he was made a senator of the Duchy of Milan, officially marking the start of his political career.

=== Religious conversion and mission to Algiers ===
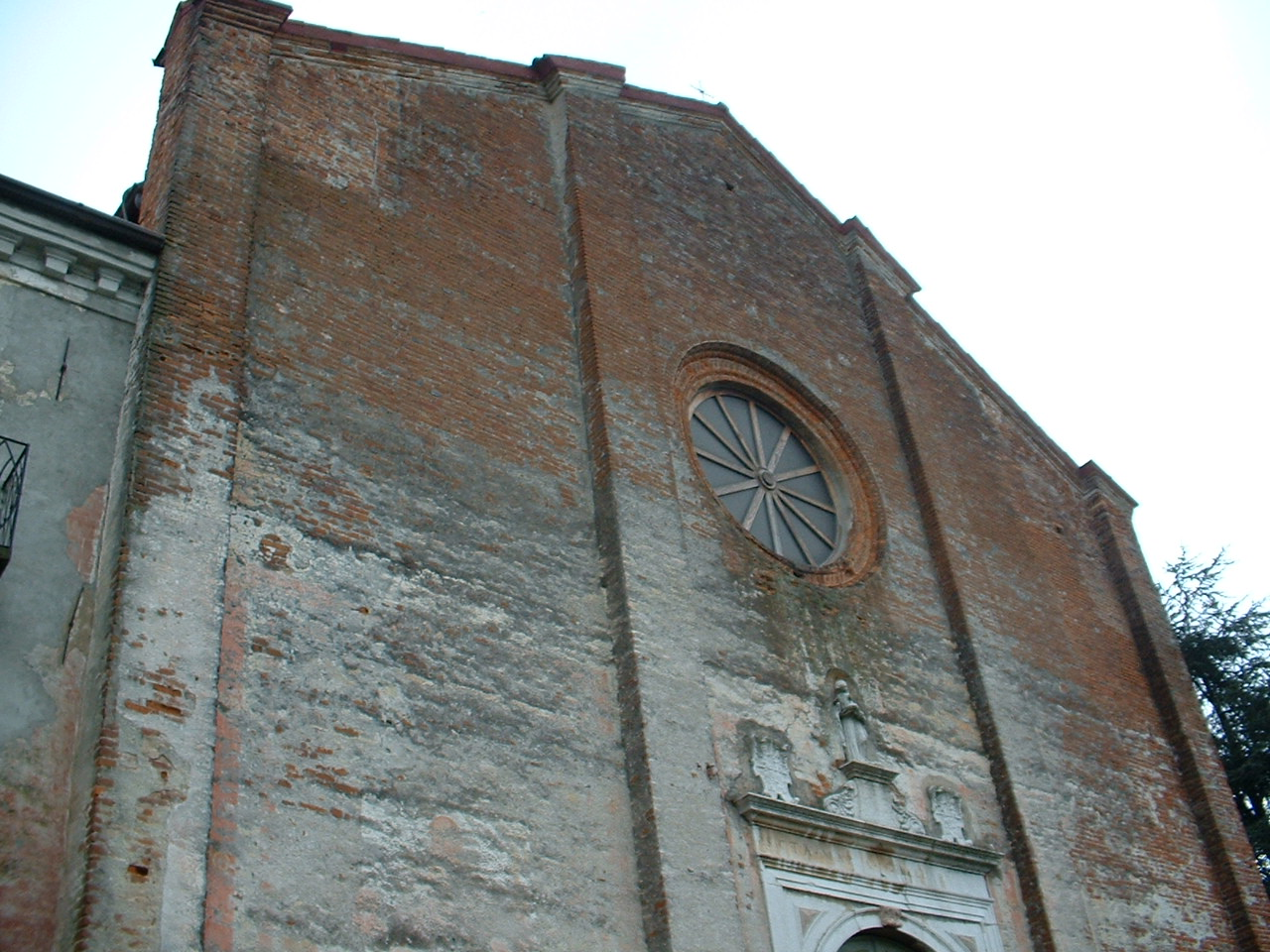
Santa Maria delle Grazie church in Soncino, where Massimiliano II's body lay in state in 1605 after being brought back from Algiers

He retired from public life after his wife's death, starting a period of profound religious meditation which also involved pilgrimages to Santiago de Compostela and Jerusalem. In 1596 he arrived back in Soncino, where he decided to become a Capuchin friar at the monastery he had helped found only a few years earlier. He took the name of Fra Ambrogio and handed his title as marquess over to his son Ermes II. He also wrote much prose and poetry during this time as well as publishing poems and other works by his father. He then was then suddenly won over by the orders set up to free Christians enslaved by Ottoman and Barbary pirates in the Mediterranean. He asked his ordinary's permission to go to Suliman, the pasha of Algiers. He spent ten months on the mission before dying in Algiers, reported by Lancetti as dying "in the despot's arms, surrounded by the Christians whose faith he had so greatly revived".

It only proved possible to repatriate his body in 1605 via the efforts of his son, who sailed to Algiers and then brought it back to Soncino by sea and land via Livorno, Genoa and Milan. It was buried in a magnificent mausoleum in the church of Santa Maria delle Grazie in the city.
