= Stampa family =

- Country: Italy
- Founded: 13th century
- Founder: Carlo Lanfranco Stampa
- Titles: Cardinal (non-hereditary); Marquess of Soncino; Marquess of Parona; Count of the Holy Roman Empire; Grandee of Spain; Count of Melzo; Count of Rivolta d'Adda; Count of Montecastello; Count of the Kingdom of Lombardy–Venetia; Count and Nobile of Ferentino; Lord of Val Bregaglia; Lord of Canobbio; Lord of Seprio; Lord of Tromello; Lord of Rosate; Patrician of Milan
- Motto: Specimen virtutis avitæ

The Stampa are a well-known family of old Italian nobility that rose to prominence in the 15th century. They were Grandees of Spain, members the Order of the Golden Fleece and owned many estates throughout the Italian Peninsula, including a Castle in Soncino, a Palace in Milan, and countless others in Muggiò, Melzo, Gorgonzola, Rivolta d'Adda, Ferentino and Rome. They are related to some of the most important Italian noble houses, such as the Doria, Sforza, Gonzaga, Borromeo and Visconti.

== Early history ==
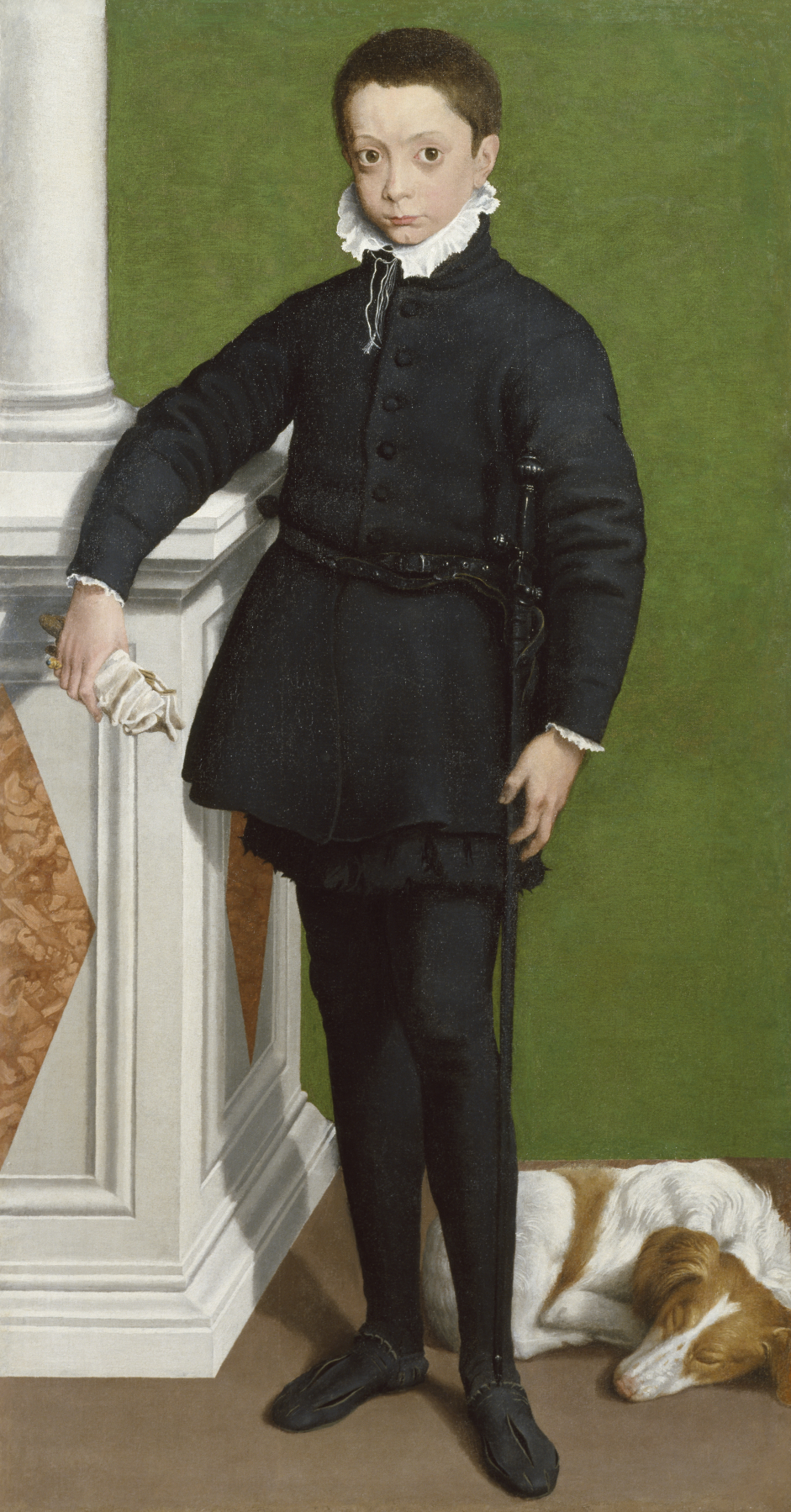
Massimiliano II Stampa, 3rd Marquess of Soncino, portrayed in 1557 by Sofonisba Anguissola.

The Stampa trace their ancestry back to Carlo Lanfranco of the dukes of Étampes, later governor of Milan under Charles the Great. His descendants settled in Milan and Gravedona, and ruled over the Val Bregaglia. The best evidence for this is the city of Stampa, named so by the family in honour of its ancestors.

However, historians such as the Count Pompeo Litta do not believe these sources, arguing that it was very common for aristocratic families to trace their ancestry back to France. One of the earliest documents Litta could find dates to 1277, when the Archbishop Ottone Visconti became Lord of Milan: it consists in a register compiled by Ottone himself, granting several privileges to the most influential families of the city, including the Stampa and their progeny.

The Stampa decided the destiny of Milan on more than one occasion. The first time was in 1450, when they helped Francesco I Sforza become Duke of Milan. In February the Venetians had sent an ambassador, Leonardo Venieri, to negotiate the city's surrender and help them defeat Sforza. Giovanni Stampa marched onto Milan with his army and killed Venieri on the stairs of Palazzo Reale, forcing the Milanese to surrender. The Duke was naturally obliged to the family, and rewarded them with many honours.

== Stampa di Soncino ==
The branch of Soncino, arguably the most important of all, originated with the emblematic figure of Massimiliano I Stampa, son of count Pietro Martire Stampa and countess Barbara Crivelli.

Massimiliano was a loyal courtier of Francesco II Sforza and castellan of the Sforza Castle from 1531. The Duke held him in high regard, and in 1534 was appointed to accompany the future duchess Christina of Denmark on her first trip to Milan. He also hosted a reception for her in his Cusago Castle, which he bought that same year.

After the death of Francesco II in 1535 the city was about to plunge into chaos, just as it happened when Filippo Maria Visconti died. To avoid disorders, Massimiliano took charge of an embassy and offered Milan to Charles V, Emperor of the Holy Roman Empire. In recognition, Massimiliano was created 1st Marquess of Soncino and granted an allowance of 50.000 scudi.

The family ruled over Milan until 1876, and the city flourished immensely under their guidance. Massimiliano Cesare Stampa, the last Marquess of Soncino, died without children and donated his castle to the municipality. His assets were acquired by the Casati family, thus creating a new branch called Casati Stampa di Soncino.

=== Marquises of Soncino Stampa (1536–1876) ===
- Massimiliano I (1536–1543), Count and 1st Marquess of Soncino from 1536
- Ermes I (1543–1557), Marquess of Soncino, brother of Massimiliano I
- Massimiliano II (1557–1596), 3rd Marquess of Soncino, son of Ermes I. Married to Marianna de Leyva, aunt of Suor Virginia de Leyva
- Ermes II (1596–1621), 4th Marquess of Soncino, son of Massimiliano II
- Massimiliano III (1621–1659), 5th Marquess of Soncino, son of Ermes II, sentenced to death for murder
- Giovanni I (1659–1678), 6th Marquess of Soncino, brother of Massimiliano III
- Massimiliano IV Domenico (1678–1693), 7th Marquess of Soncino, son of Giovanni I
- Giuseppe I (1693–1735), 8th Marquess of Soncino, brother of Massimiliano IV
- Massimiliano V Giovanni (1735–1769), 9th Marquess of Soncino, son of Giuseppe I
- Massimiliano VI Giuseppe (1769–1818), 10th Marquess of Soncino, son of Massimiliano V Giovanni, Grandee of Spain and Member of the Order of the Iron Crown, married to Princess Carlotta Gonzaga di Luzzara (1767-1823) in 1785
- Massimiliano VII Giovanni (1818–1824), 11th Marquess of Soncino, son of Massimiliano VI Giuseppe
- Massimiliano VIII (1824–1834), 12th Marquess of Soncino, son of Massimiliano VII Giovanni
- Massimiliano IX Giovanni (1834–1876), 13th Marquess of Soncino, son of Massimiliano VIII and last Marquess of Soncino

After Massimiliano IX Giovanni's death, the Casati inherited the title of Marquess of Soncino, which was held unofficially by Camillo Casati Stampa from 1876 to 1892

=== Casati Stampa, Marquess of Casate (1876–1970) ===
- Camillo I, Marquess of Casate (1892–1946), husband of Luisa Casati.
- Camillo II, Marquess of Casate (1946–1970), son of Camillo I. His infamous suicide marked the end of the dynasty.

== Stampa di Ferentino ==
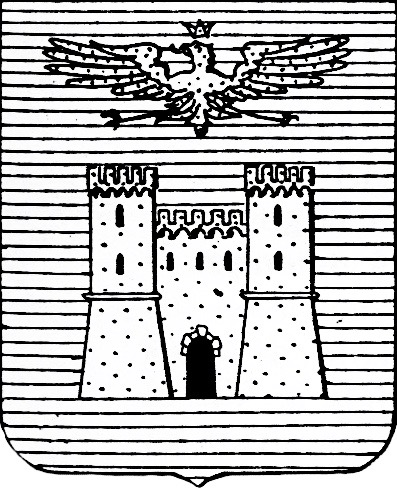
Coat of arms of the Stampa di Ferentino

In the early years of the 18th century Carlo Gaetano Stampa moved to central Italy and acquired a palace near the Vatican, Palazzo Capponi Stampa. A few years later his cousin Pietro Antonio Stampa inherited the palace, settling in Rome and marrying a local noblewoman, who had a dowry of estates in Ferentino and Alatri.

In 1779, with the consent of Pope Pius VI, Pietro Antonio's youngest son Angelo joined the council of the 15 noble families of Ferentino. He and his older brother Filippo were loyal servants of the papacy, so much that in 1770 Pope Clement XIV appointed them state administrators of the Duchy of Castro.

There is still a plaque in his memory at the entrance of Ferentino’s town hall:

"Count Filippo Stampa (1710–1789), scholar and administrator, lived here. A.D. 2001"

Among the other commercial activities which the Stampa administered on behalf of the Holy See, there were several iron mines in Elba. The family also had the wood cutting rights in the area of Canino. It was a very lucrative business, but when Lucien Bonaparte was confined to the Papal States, he claimed part of those estates. After Napoleon's exile to Saint Helena, Pope Pius VII offered Angelo Stampa's first born Pietro an important job within the Papal States to compensate him for the financial damage.

The relationship between the family and the Holy See continued with succeeding generations. Cardinal Mastai Ferretti, later Pope Pius IX, ensured that Domenico Stampa contracted a good marriage with Paolina Vinciguerra, last heir of the counts Antonini di Alatri.

The family continues to exist in Rome and Milan.

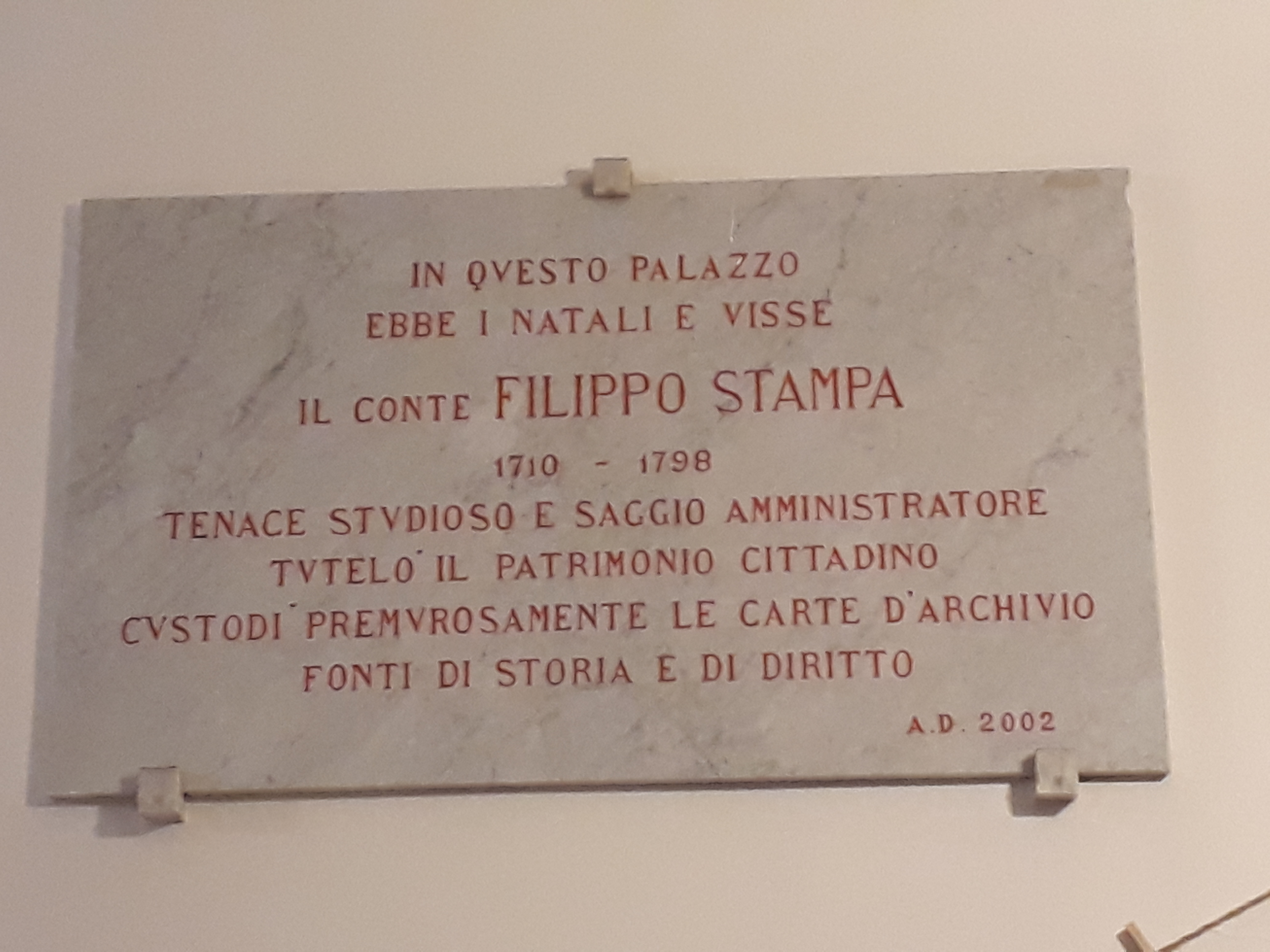
Commemorative plaque in memory of count Filippo Stampa (1710 - 1798) at the entrance of Ferentino's town hall.

== Notable members ==
- Carlo Gaetano Stampa, Archbishop of Milan
- Massimiliano I Stampa, nobleman and politician
- Massimiliano II Stampa, nobleman and writer
- Stefano Stampa, stepson and biographer of Alessandro Manzoni
- Gaspara Stampa, 16th century poet.
- Ermete Stampa, Bishop of Novara
- Giorgio Stampa, Discalced Carmelite
- Massimiliano IX Giovanni, patriot
- George Loraine Stampa, artist
