= Portrait of Massimiliano II Stampa =

Painting by Sofonisba Anguissola

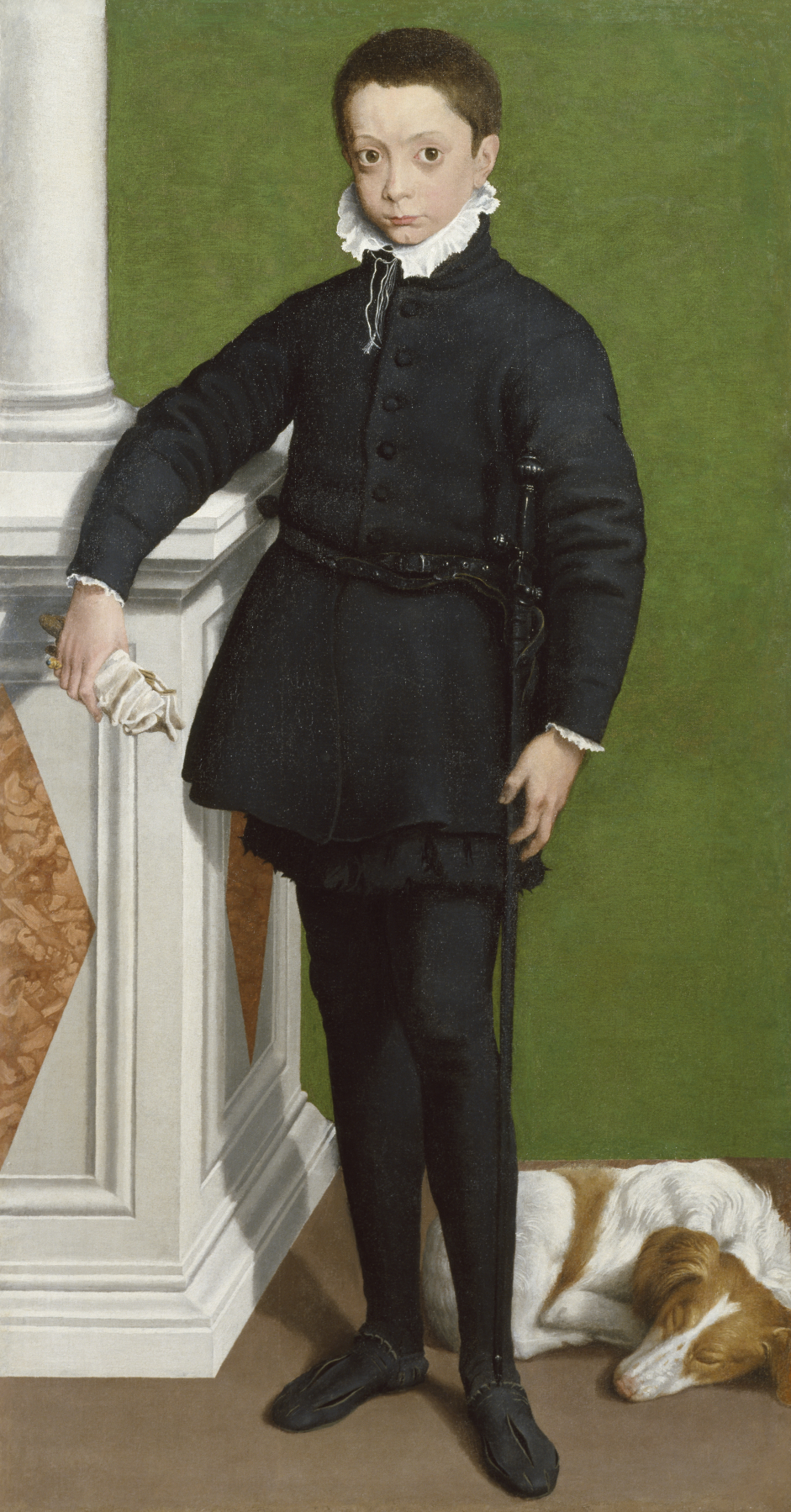
- Artist: Sofonisba Anguissola
- Year: c.1558
- Medium: oil on canvas
- Dimensions: 134.94 cm × 71.12 cm (53.13 in × 28.00 in)
- Location: Walters Art Museum, Baltimore

Sofonisba Anguissola's Portrait of Massimiliano II Stampa, painted in 1557, captures a young nobleman dressed in elaborate court attire, symbolizing his inheritance of the Marchese of Soncino title. The inscription on the reverse of the canvas, revealed during a 1983 conservation, identified the subject as Massimiliano II, age nine, and the third marchese of Soncino. The painting includes a sleeping dog beside him, reflecting the Renaissance tradition of using animals as symbols of loyalty and virtue. The painting’s journey through various owners before settling at the Walters Art Museum in 1931 adds to its historical intrigue. Anguissola, one of the Renaissance's few celebrated female artists, is renowned for her insightful and detailed portraits, with this piece standing as one of her major early commissions. Despite the challenges faced by female artists during the period, Anguissola’s work, including this portrait, has gained recognition for its technical skill and symbolic depth.

== Description ==
While the official name is the Portrait of Massimiliano II Stampa, it is more popularly known as the Medici Boy. The portrait captures the full body image of a young Italian nobleman elaborately adorned in the traditional black clothing of the Italian courts during the 16th century. The boy has a stern expression on his face, with his left hand resting on his sword while his right-hand holds a medallion, and behind him lays a small, sleeping dog. The Stampa family commissioned the portrait to commemorate Massimiliano's inheritance of the title after the death of his father in 1557. His dress is heavily influenced by the Spanish dominance of Lombardy at the time of commission, and the painting's style is similarly influenced by Spanish portraitists of the time in its aristocratically stern posing and allegorical symbols of wealth and social success.

=== Inscription & Identity of Figure ===
"MAX.STA.MAR.SON.III

AET. AN. VIIII

1557"

The painting includes an inscription on the reverse side of the canvas, which has played a significant role in identifying and providing context to the identity of the young boy. On December 19, 1983, The Walters Art Museum conducted a conservation of the painting in which they cleaned, stabilized, mounted, re-housed, and coated the portrait. It was through this treatment by Sian Jones of The Walters Art Museum's Department of Conservation and Technical Research that new discoveries were made about the identity of the young noble through the removal of the lining of the picture. This removal revealed an inscription on the reverse side of the original canvas. This inscription provides an important clue in discovering the true identity of the young man. The lettering, assumed by scholars to be written by Anguissola herself, is typical of the mid-sixteenth century and represents the year of creating the portrait, as well as clues to the identity of the boy. The first line of the inscription reads "MAX.STA.MAR.SON.III." Traditionally, in Renaissance art, the first line of the inscription would reveal the subject and identity of the figure, and Anguissola's inscription is similarly conceived. However, what sets this inscription apart is the fact that she uses contractions and obscurities to identify the boy rather than simply writing his name and title. "MAX" represents the boy's given name, "STA" identifies his family name, "MAR" suggests the boy was a marchese (also known as marquis), and "SON" identifies the beginning three letters of the territory he was marchese of. The Roman numbers "III" identify him as the third marchese of Soncino. From this first line of the inscription, it has been established that the figure in the painting is Massimiliano II Stampa, who was the third marchese of the north Italian city of Soncino.

The second line of the inscription reads "AET. AN. VIIII" which is an abbreviated version of "Aetatis Anni VIIII." "Aetatis Anni" translates to mean "at the age of," while "VIIII" is the Roman numeral for nine. From this line, it is revealed that the subject in the portrait (Massimiliano II Stampa) was nine years of age when Anguissola painted the portrait. The third and final line of the inscription, "1557," is most easily identifiable and understood. The number "1557" represents the year the painting was executed by Anguissola.

=== Symbolism ===
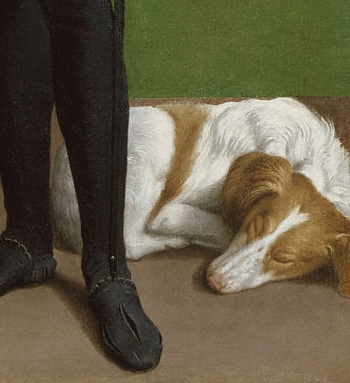
a faithful dog is typical of aristocratic portraiture

While the portrait's main focus is Massimiliano II Stampa, it is important to recognize and mention the dog that lies asleep behind his foot. Animals in Renaissance art symbolized a range of values, from loyalty and courage to purity and rebirth, while also reflecting the era's renewed fascination with the natural world. Animals often serve as powerful allegorical elements that connect human and divine realms. The dog featured in this portrait can be interpreted to reflect the young noble's own companionship, loyalty, and fidelity.

== History ==
=== History of the Stampa Family ===
There are at least four other versions of the painting of the young noble, which have further led scholars to confirm that Massimiliano II Stampa and his family were well-known and of noble birth. The Stampa family is recorded as a noble Milanese family who immigrated to Italy with Charlemagne. Massimiliano I, the young noble's uncle, is the most notable member of the family due to his work as governor of the fortress of Milan and voluntary capitulation to Charles V. These acts awarded him the title of "Marchese of Soncino" in 1536, a title which the Stampa family remained in control of until the seventeenth century. Massimiliano I bore no sons, so he passed his rights as marchese to his brother, Ermete, who married Isabella Rangoni of Modena, and together they birthed Massimiliano II Stampa, who was named after his uncle. In 1557, Ermete died, making Massimiliano II Stampa his successor and, in turn, the third marchese of Soncino.

Though the earliest records of the Stampa lineage begin with a French condottiere who came to Italy with Charlemagne, some scholars have theorized that the Stampa family were descendants of, or have ties with, the Medici family. This theory arose as the Stampa family maintained close ties with Milanese and Spanish nobility and could have created social and political alliances similar to those of the Medicis. The theory of direct lineage between the families has been disproven, but the connection between the Stampa family and the Medici family remains due to their similar cultural influence, as the Stampa family's lifestyle mirrored the high-ranking Medici court's political tactics and patronage of the arts. Other theories involving the noble's lineage have previously suggested that the young boy was a member of the Gaddi family of Florence, the Prince of the Este family, or the Prince of Asturias. These theories were more often framed as cultural or hypothetical, displaying the shared political and social circles of the European nobility. They were also disproven after the conservation of the portrait revealed the true identity of the young boy.

=== Provenance ===
The Portrait of Massimiliano II Stampa currently resides in the Walters Art Museum, Baltimore, USA, but its provenance has been extensive and contains some unknowns in terms of its procurements. The earliest history of acquisition begins at the Chantel Collection, Lyon, but the date and method of acquirement remain unknown.The portrait was then procured by Galerie Trotti & Cie in Paris, but again, the date and means of acquisition are unknown. James Stillman of New York was the next to acquire or inherit the portrait, and C. C. Stillman inherited it prior to 1921. In 1927, the painting was listed for sale at the American Art Association Galleries in New York and was cataloged as Portrait of a Young Prince of the Este Family by G. B. Moroni. The painting was purchased that year by Henry Walters of Baltimore. In 1931, Henry Walters bequeathed the painting to the Walters Art Museum, where it remains today.

== Historical Context ==
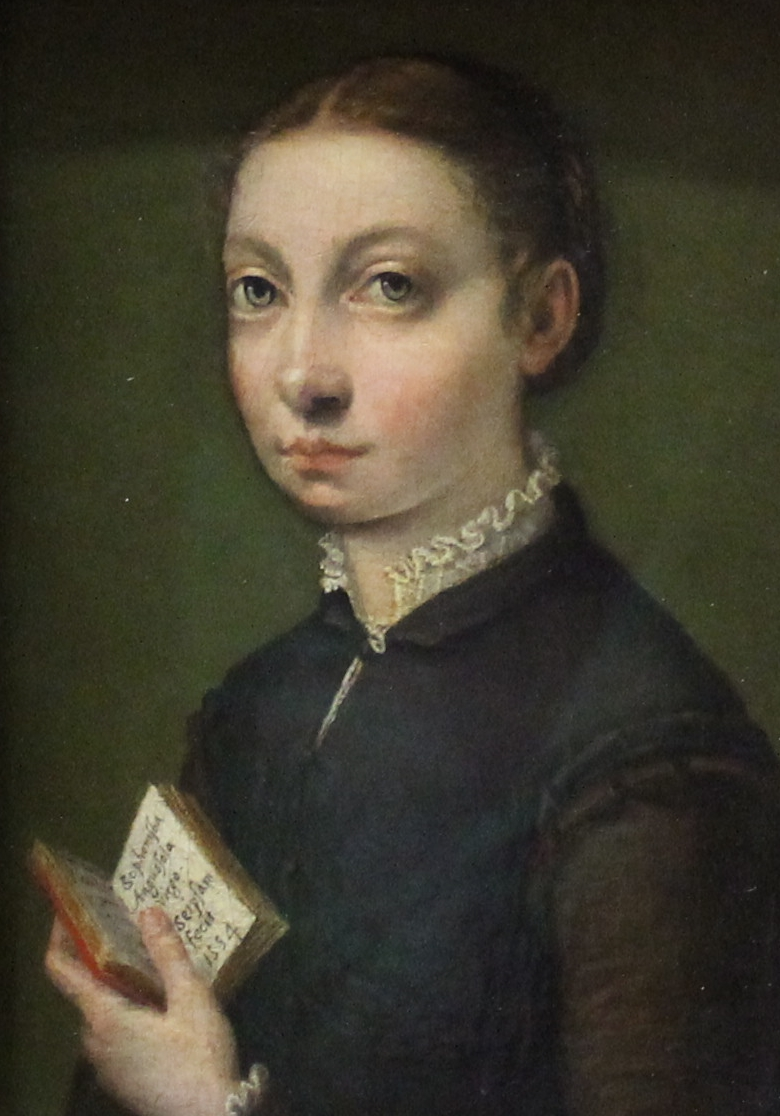
Sofonisba Anguissola

=== Attribution ===
The Portrait of Massimiliano II Stampa is believed to be one of Sofonisba Anguissola's first major commissions.Anguissola, born in 1532, was an Italian Renaissance painter who came from a family of minor nobility, with parents who supported her pursuit of education and passion for the arts. Anguissola is best known for her portraits, both of notable and prominent figures of the time, and self-portraits of herself. Anguissola was among the first female artists to receive recognition and an international reputation during the 16th century and the Renaissance. Artist Giorgio Vasari is quoted as describing her and her work as showing "greater application and better grace than any other woman of our age in her endeavors at drawing... by herself has created rare and beautiful paintings." Her style combined elements of Mannerism and the High Renaissance, with her portraits characterized by soft and detailed depictions, an emphasis on facial expressions, and portraits that were often thought-provoking and complimenting all at once. By the time she began her work on The Portrait of Massimiliano II Stampa in 1557-58, she had already achieved high status and recognition as a female artist, having studied under Bernardino Campi, Bernardino Gatti, and Michelangelo. Her talent, along with her recognition and education, granted her the role of lady-in-waiting to Elizabeth of Valois (King Phillip II's wife) where she was able to create portraits at the court of King Philip II of Spain. At one point, Anguissola's portrait was misattributed to Giovanni Battista Moroni, possibly due to stylistic similarities with Moroni's The Knight in Black. Misattribution of female artists, like Sofonisba Anguissola, during the Renaissance, was not uncommon.

=== Women in the Renaissance ===
Female artists in the Renaissance were often misattributed or overlooked due to societal gender biases. Many of their works were mistakenly assigned to male artists or left unattributed, often because their techniques were similar to those of their male counterparts. This phenomenon of misattribution was especially prevalent for artists like Artemisia Gentileschi and Judith Leyster. In some cases, the misattributions were intentional, as art dealers sought to profit through male artists. They would even go as far as altering the original signatures and changing them to male artists.

Though female artists faced considerable challenges during the Renaissance, they were still able to find ways to assert their agency in the arts, as Anguissola demonstrates, and scholars today have been able to recognize these efforts and achievements. Much of the scholarly focus on women in Renaissance art began in the 1960s and 1970s with the rise of feminist art history. This movement sought to uncover the works and contributions of female artists by highlighting their creativity and acknowledging their work. Scholars have since identified several female artists from this period while also examining how women shaped their gender identities through art patronage, collections, and commissions.

== See also ==
- List of paintings by Sofonisba Anguissola
