= Soncino's Castle =

Coordinates: 45°28′13″N 9°10′46″E

- Rocca di Soncino
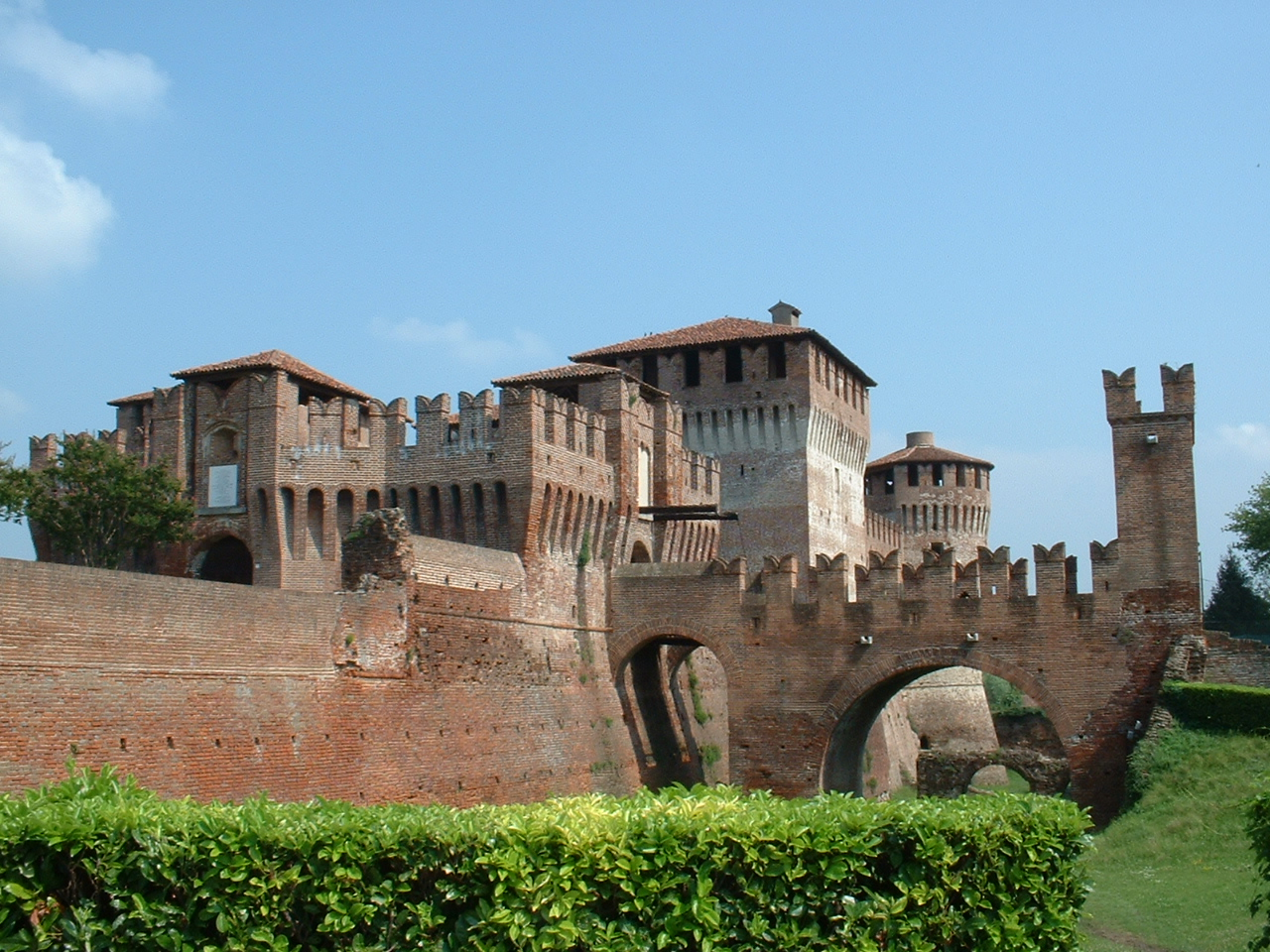
- Interactive map of the Soncino's Castle area

General information
- Location: Soncino, Lombardy, Italy

Soncino Castle (Italian: Rocca di Soncino) is a military fortress in Soncino, northern Italy. It was built in the 10th century, and it became active around 1500.

== History ==
A set of walls around a defensive structure were built in the 10th century, in order defend the borough from the marauding Hungarians. In 1200 it was besieged several times by the armies of Milan and Brescia, and in 1283, after being destroyed by the attacks of those armies, the commune of Soncino decided to rebuild the castle. In 1312 the castle was occupied by the Cremonese army, and in 1391 by the Milanese army, using it during the war against the Venetian Republic. In the year 1426 new walls were added to raise the previous ones.

When the "peace of Lodi" was declared in 1454, the borders between the Venetian Republic and Duchy of Milan were established, and the Castle passed to the Duchy of Milan. The Duke of Milan, Francesco Sforza, reinforced the walls of and around the castle, which led to the request for construction in 1468 to Soncino people's desire requested by letter to the Duke of Milan, although he chose to erect just a new tower with the characteristic circular shape. Further reconstruction took place from 1471 by Benedetto Ferrini and Danese Maineri, engineers responsible for the fortresses of Soncino and Romanengo. and in 1473, Bartolomeo Gadio also contributed. From 1499 to 1509, the castle was held by the Venetians, until with French aid, the fortress was again held by the Milanese.

=== Assignment to the Stampa Family ===
In 1536 the Holy Roman Emperor Charles V assigned the Milanese Stampa family the Marquisate of Soncino. This family transformed the castle into a residence commissioning frescoes by Bernardino Gatti and Vincenzo Campi for internal rooms of the castle and the chapel. In 1876 Massimiliano Stampa, last Marquis of Soncino, bequeathed the castle to the town, and the town hall in 1883, in collaboration with Luca Beltrami, began the restoration of the castle.

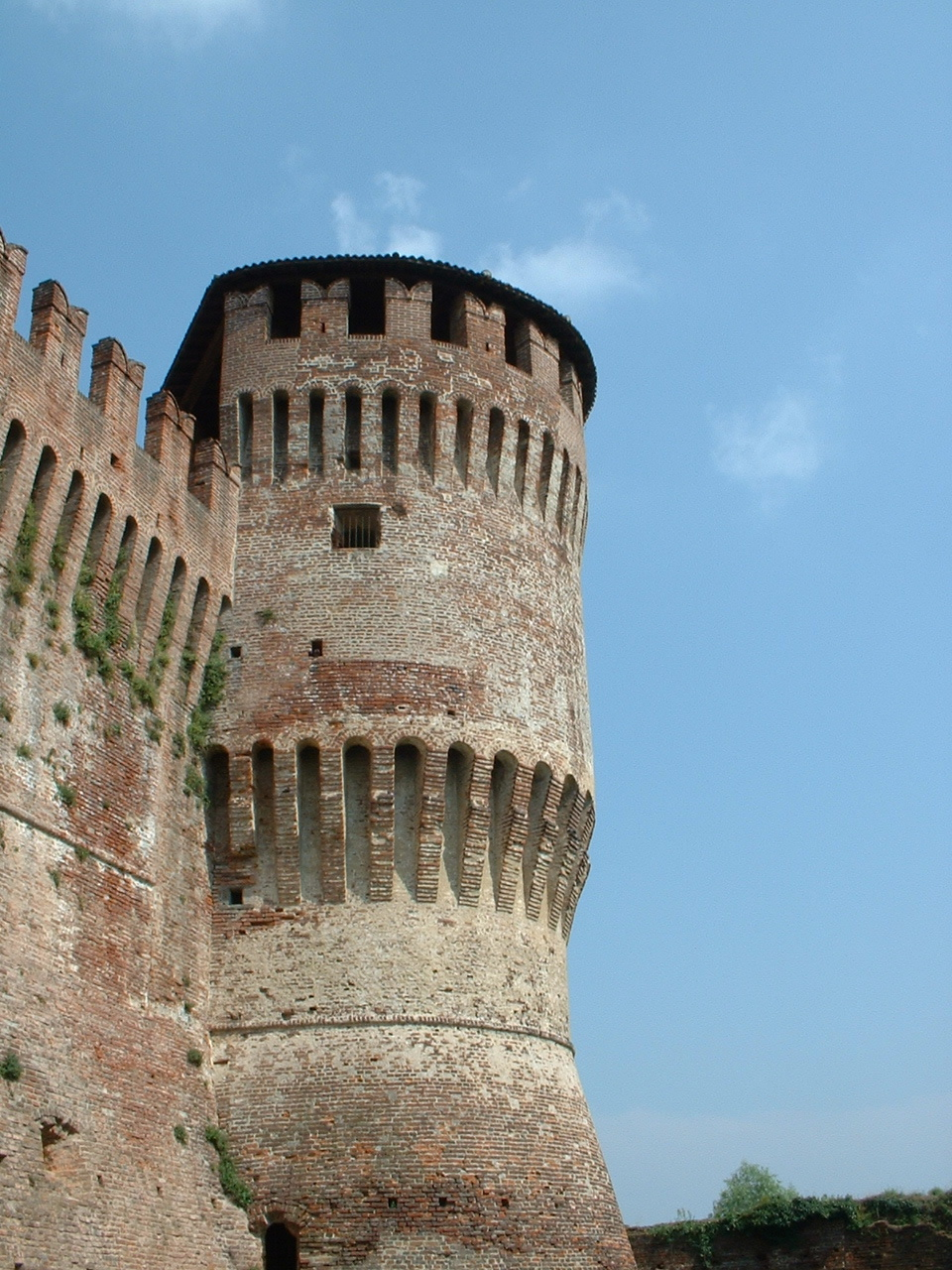
The round tower from outside

== The structure ==
The Soncino Castle is strategically positioned near the town, although the four centuries it has been used as a residency has given it a harmony with the external sides, starting from the entrance that today is positioned into urban square. The entrance of the castle, a portal, that once a time was limited by a drawbridge, it was replaced at the end of 1800 by a ravelin that give access to a first courtyard used in the past as disengagement for the troops and provided of stairs to access the battlements of the external walls. The fortress entrance was permitted by two different drawbridges, one carriageable and one pedestrian. Passing through the disengagement, after the second entrance, there is the real courtyard, and in the center of that there is a well able to guarantee the necessary water in case of siege, and from this courtyard it is possible to access to the secret's underground.

Among the four towers, the most interesting is the Castellan's tower (Torre del Castellano), called in this way because once a time it was the official residence of the Castle's Governor, and for this reason it was possible to isolate it from the rest of the castle in case of sieges. That tower was connected directly to the secret's underground and from here, through a secret passage, was possible to pass through the castle's ditch and run on the fields around. Is this one of the renaissance's decoration areas, with frescos and fireplaces with pyramidal hood.

== The Internal Courtyard ==
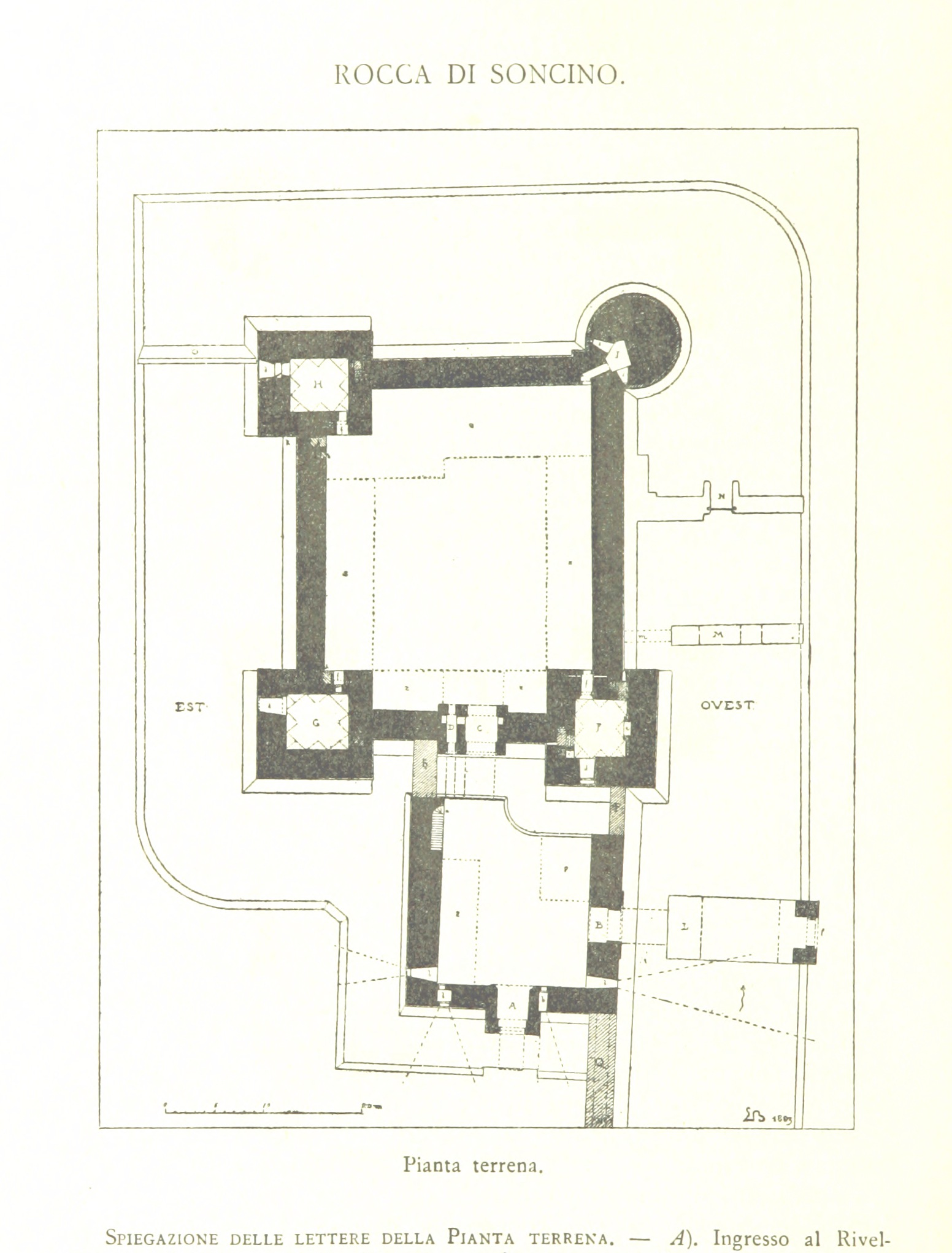
The floor plan

The chapel built by the Marquis of Stampa is located in the 16th-century south-east tower. Here is possible, still today, to see traces of frescoes including the most ancient of that (dating at the end of the 15th century), depicting the Madonna with the child Jesus Christ.

Still here, it is possible to find a fresco from an anonymous painter representing the Duchy of Milan's coat-of-arms flanked by torches and water buckets, symbols the personal motto of Francesco Sforza "Accendo e spengo" (I light up and I turn off), together with others heraldic enterprises. The ceiling is painted with an arbour drawing as in the Milan's Sforza Castle.

The round tower, unique on its particular shape, at the battlements level presents a round room with a circular canopy in the center that has a cylindrical column that lead to the top of the bastion that is in conical shape and significantly higher respect to the others just to give a higher watch point. This tower, built in the 1500, has traces of several coat-of-arms paintings and of a crucifixion, today in a deep degradation status. This last painting means that the chapel was placed here, in the past, and moved eventually in the other tower.

== Bibliography ==
- Guida ai castelli d'Italia: origini, architettura e storia, eventi castellani, ospitalità, visita e orari, E. Roddolo, Piemme, 1996
- I castelli della Lombardia, Conti F., Hybsch V. and Vincenti A., Novara 1992, v. III p. 76
