= Tugdual Menon =

French composer (before 1502–1566/1568)

Tugdual Menon (also in sources Tuttvalle, Tugdualo, Tudual, Tuttuale, Tuduuale, Jugdulus; before 1502 – 1566/1568), was a French composer. He was likely teacher of the organist Claudio Merulo.

== Life ==
Menon was born in Brittany before 1502, and in the early 1520s he went to Italy, residing in Correggio, a small town near Reggio Emilia. He was married with a woman called Giulia, and in 1521 he had a daughter, Margherita, baptized with count Sigismondo II d'Este as Godfather. He had eleven children, the 4th one of them called Sigismondo Quirino. He was close to the House of Este, rulers of Modena and Ferrara, and to Count Boiardo of Scandiano, who gave him hospitality in 1543. He was also property owner in Correggio's land.

In 1548 he was certainly in Ferrara, at the court of Renate of France, and he lived there for a short time. In 1550 he was in Cambrai, France, returning to Correggio two years later. One year later, he was in Ferrara again, where he died probably in 1567.

== Music ==
He wrote a book of 44 four-voice Madrigals dedicated to Renate of France (1548), and a madrigal for an anthology dedicated to incoronation of Duke Ercole II d'Este (1534). He had many students; he may have been the teacher of the poet Gaspara Stampa.

== References and further reading ==
- Giuseppe Martini, Claudio Merulo, Parma, Ordine Costantiniano di S. Giorgio, 2005 (pp. 36–37)
- Cécile Vendramini: Les offrandes musicales à Renée de France, fille de Louis XII, Paris, 1997 (pp. 199–205)
- Laurie Stras, Women and Music in Sixteenth-Century Ferrara, Cambridge Univ Press, 2018 (online), ISBN 9781316650455, online access at https://doi.org/10.1017/9781316650455
