= George Loraine Stampa =

British cartoonist

- Born: Giorgio Stampa; 29 November 1875; Istanbul, Ottoman Empire
- Died: 26 May 1951 (aged 75); London, England
- Education: Bedford Modern School
- Known for: British artist Contributor to Punch

George Loraine Stampa (29 November 1875 – 26 May 1951), also known as G. L. Stampa, was a British artist. He contributed to Punch for over 50 years and was the illustrator for books written by A. P. Herbert, E. V. Lucas and Anthony Armstrong. He contributed to most of the illustrated weeklies, including The Bystander, The Humorist, The Sketch and The Tatler. Stampa exhibited at the Royal Institute of Painters and the Royal Academy, and was a participant in the art competition at the 1928 Summer Olympics.

== Early life ==
George Loraine Stampa was born Giorgio Stampa in Istanbul on 29 November 1875, the son of Giorgio Domenico Stampa and Ann (née Heelis) who was the daughter of the Rector of Long Marton in England. Stampa's father, Giorgio Domenico Stampa, was also born in Istanbul but educated in Westmorland, England, under the Rev. William Shepherd at Long Marton, later joining the architectural practice of Edward Walters in Manchester where he worked on the design of the Manchester Free Trade Hall and other projects in that City.

Stampa's father was later architect to Sultan Abdul Hamid in the Ottoman Empire where he worked on the design of The British Embassy at Therapia, The Sultan's Palace in Istanbul, the palace of the Kedhive of Egypt and a number of Mosques.

Stampa's father had to leave the Ottoman Empire in 1878 following a political uprising and the young Stampa then lived in England with his mother's family at Battlebarrow House in Appleby, Westmorland. In Westmorland, he enjoyed fishing with his maternal cousin, Willy Heelis, and the landscape of Westmorland had a profound effect on him and his future career as an artist. Stampa's father became a British citizen in 1889, as did his children.

George Loraine Stampa was educated at Appleby Grammar School (where the father of George Washington was educated), Bedford Modern School, Heatherly's Art School (1892–93), and, as a contemporary of Heath Robinson and Lewis Baumer, the Royal Academy Schools (1893–95). Stampa spoke Italian, French, Turkish and English.

== Stampa family history ==
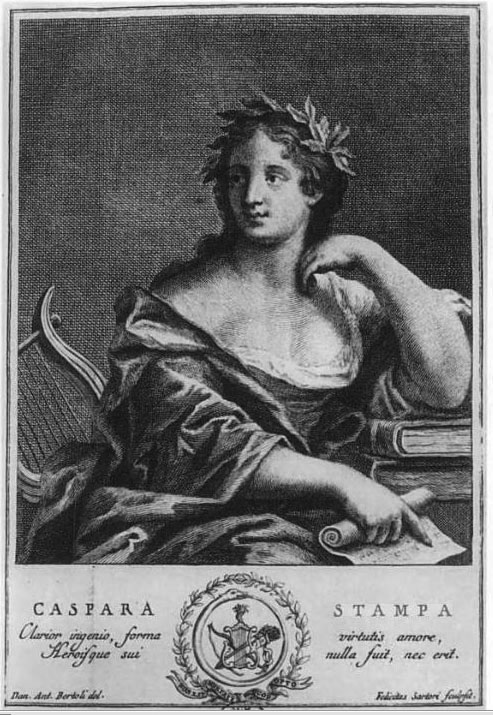
Gaspara Stampa

Stampa's family had an illustrious history. In the 8th century, his ancestor, Carlo Lanfranco D'Estampes, was seigneur of Dreux and Étampes in France. Carlo D'Estampes was made Governor of Milan by Charlemagne on the order that D'Estampes fight for control of Lombardy on behalf of the Holy Roman Empire. Carlo Lanfranco D'Estampes later established his family in Milan, Italianized his name to Stampa, and many of his descendants became successful in the Byzantine Empire.

The Aegean Island of Stampalia, renamed Astypalaia after World War II, was colonised by the family in the 14th century. At one point, the Stampa family also owned the island of Elba where Napoleon was first exiled in 1814.

One of Stampa's ancestors, Gaspara Stampa (1520-1554), was an esteemed poet during the Italian Renaissance.

== Stampa's work ==
Stampa first published in Punch in March 1894, at the request of F. C. Burnand, when the nineteen year old Stampa was still studying at Heatherley's Art School. Stampa's predilection for drawing London street urchins and mongrel dogs was in the same style as Charles Keene and Phil May. He was a major contributor to Punch for 50 years, providing material to four editors including Sir Francis Burnand, Sir Owen Seaman, Mr. E. V. Knox and Mr Kenneth Bird. At the time of his last contribution in 1949, Stampa had contributed at least 2,500 drawings to Punch.

In addition to Punch, Stampa was an illustrator for most of the illustrated weeklies, including The Bystander, The Humorist, The Sketch and The Tatler. He was an illustrator for all of Rudyard Kipling's dog stories. Stampa was also a designer of posters for London Transport, and illustrator to the Punch theatre column, "At the Play", signing some of his work as Harris Brooks. Ronald Searle took responsibility for the theatre column in 1949.

Stampa would regularly donate his drawings to charities including the Great Ormond Street Hospital, Middlesex Hospital, the Newspaper Press charities and the Rudyard Kipling Memorial Fund. He also contributed work after the explosion of the French battleship Liberté in Toulon. Stampa was commissioned to paint a cartoon, the size of a postage stamp, for Queen Mary's famous dolls' house. In 1916 he designed a card for the 19th (Western) Division of the British Expeditionary Force during World War I. His illustrations were included in books written by A. P. Herbert, E. V. Lucas and Anthony Armstrong.

Stampa's work was part of the painting event in the art competition at the 1928 Summer Olympics. He exhibited at the Royal Institute of Painters and the Royal Academy. Stampa's abiding interest in drawing animals led him to be a Life Member of London Zoo.

== Personal life ==
Stampa's elder brother, Lelio Stampa (1873-1943), was a lecturer in Modern History at the University of Oxford. T. E. Lawrence was tutored by Lelio Stampa, and Lawrence would later give the Stampa family a suit of chainmail obtained during Lawrence's travels in Arabia. The youngest of Stampa's brothers, Arturo, died of pneumonia in 1892.

Stampa was a first cousin of William Heelis, husband of Beatrix Potter. Stampa's brother, Lelio, was a witness at the wedding.

Stampa was a member of the Savage Club, having been elected by Leonard Raven-Hill, and would later serve on the board of trustees. He designed a menu for a dinner at the Savage Club on 21 January 1928 that was chaired by A. P. Herbert. Stampa was also a young attendee at the Langham Sketch Club in All Souls Place near Regent Street, London, and would later be its chairman in 1914. As a fan of cricket he would regularly attend matches at Lord's.

In 1906 Stampa married Ethel Crowther (d. 1946), eldest daughter of the late Clifford Crowther of Claygate. In 1908 they had one son, Arthur L Stampa, who was the principal beneficiary of his father's will. Stampa died in London on 26 May 1951. John O'London's Weekly described him as:

The most cheerful, contented and amiable inhabitants of what is called Bohemian London. He never envies anyone and sincerely appreciates the work of his rivals. The consequence is that no man has a larger number of friends.

Perhaps his best epitaph was written by his granddaughter, Flavia Stampa Gruss, in her book, The Last Bohemian:

He was a man who cared deeply for England and things English. Although given to nostalgia, G. L. S. was at home in the world of his life and times which, however Bohemian (of the gentler sort), remained one of "an English sun under an English Heaven". Yet we should never forget that G. L. S. gained from his Italian forebears a special warmth and lightness of touch - the ragamuffins of Seven Dials were the blood brothers of those of Venice and Milan. He was very much a man of his times, an honoured member of a family of ancient descent.

== Gallery ==
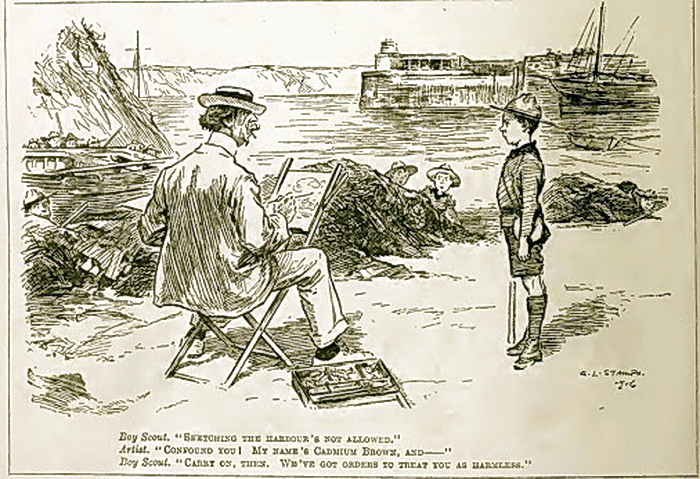
The Scout

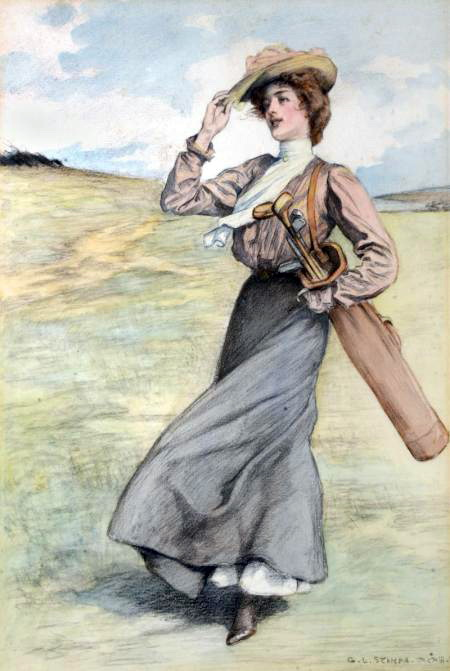
Lady playing golf

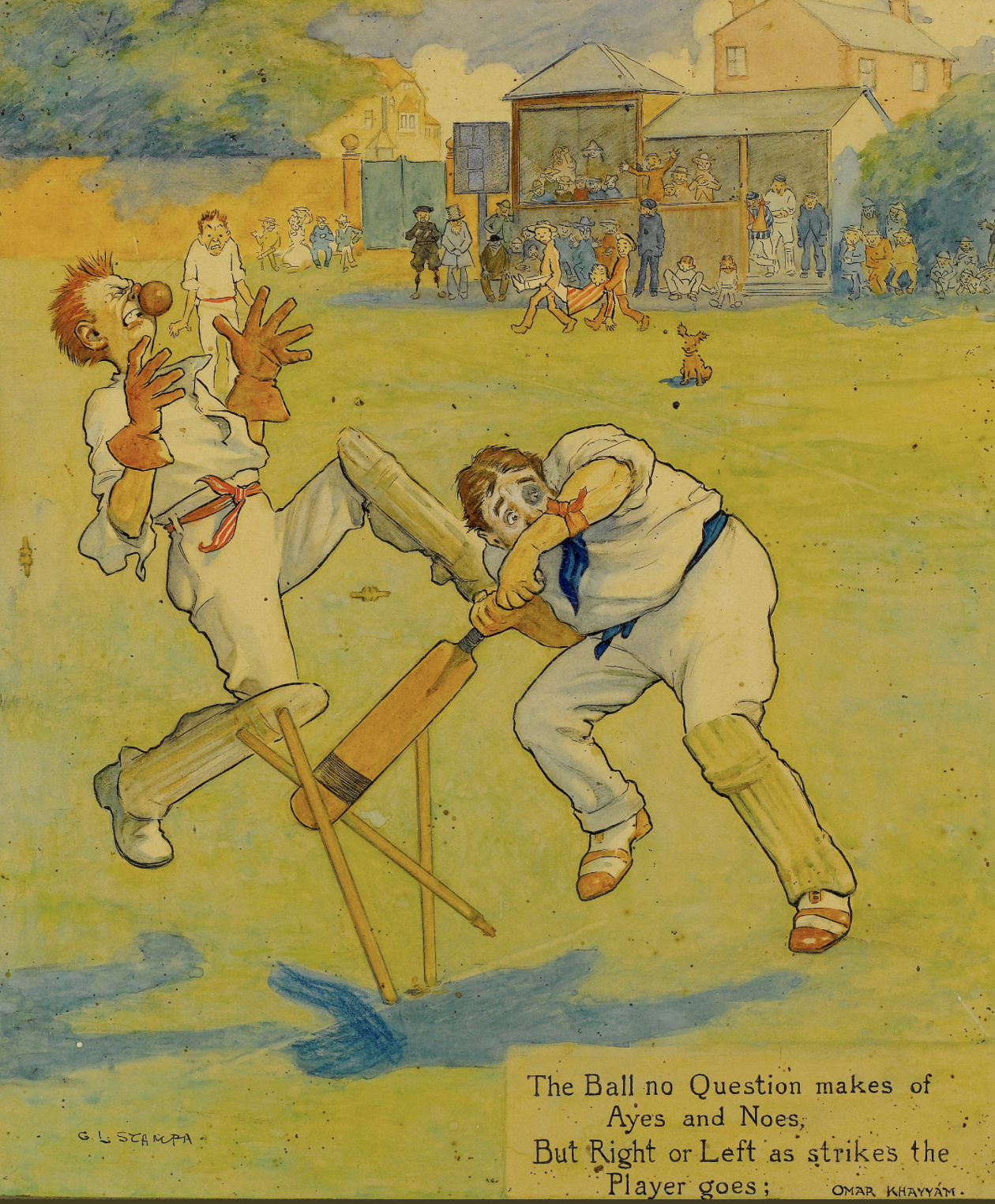
Cricket

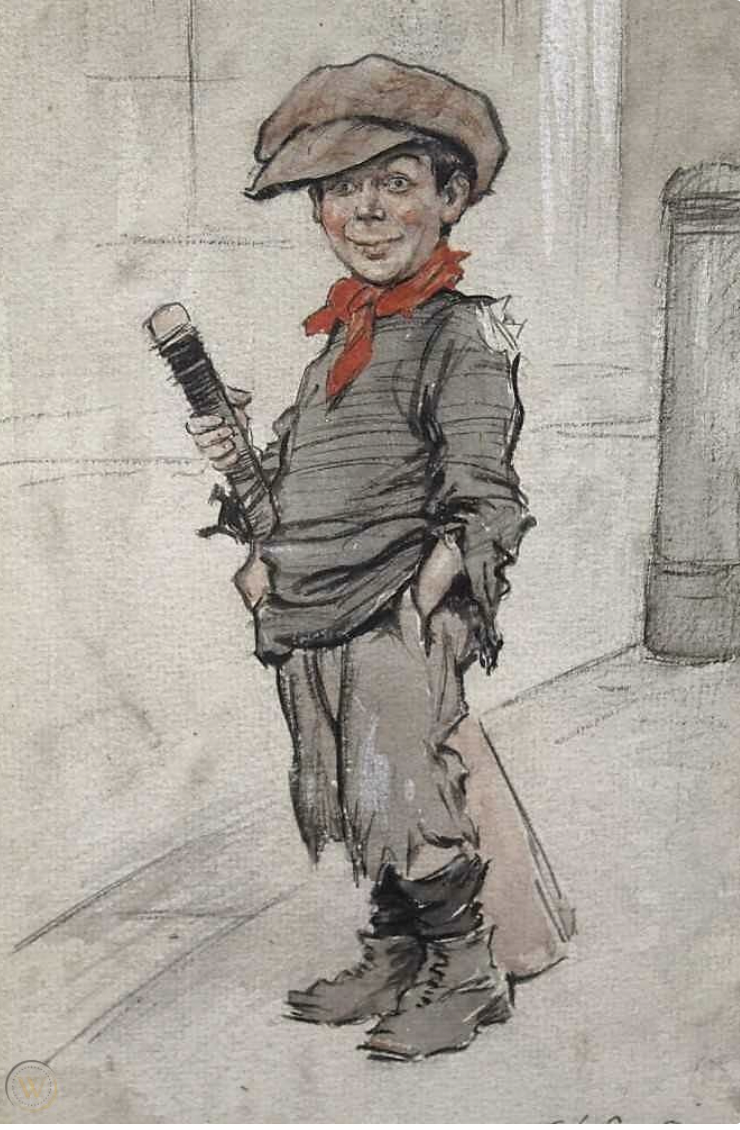
Ragamuffin street urchin boy

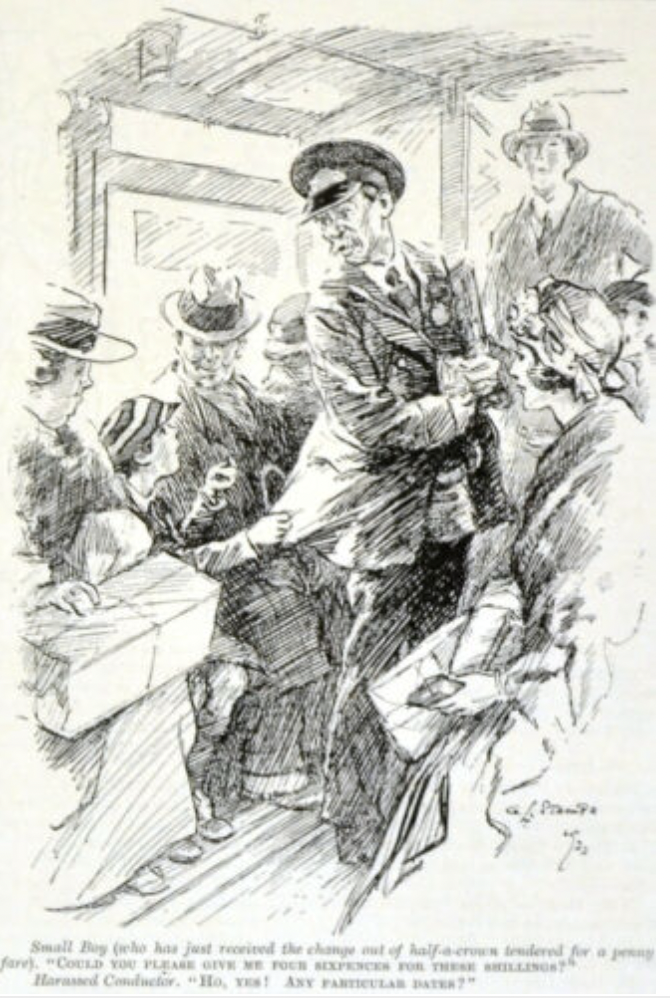
Harassed Conductor

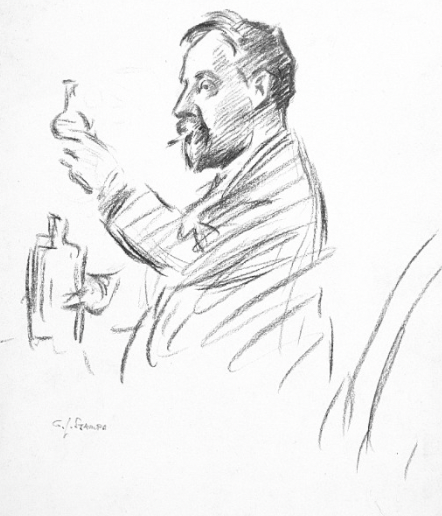
William Breakspeare

== Selected works ==
- In praise of dogs; an anthology for all dog lovers, by G. L. Stampa. Published by Frederick Muller, London, 1955. OCLC 39915033
- Humours of the Street, by G. L. Stampa. Published by Methuen, London, 1921. OCLC 16738676
- Ragamuffins, by G. L. Stampa. Published by Duckworh, London, 1916. OCLC 773672791
- Loud laughter: humorous drawings illustrating Easy French exercises, by G. L. Stampa with verses by C. Errington Pegler. Published by Cassell & Co. in London and New York, 1907. OCLC 41037798

== Selected book illustrations ==
- Kipling, Rudyard. Collected Dog Stories. Published by World Books, London, 1939. OCLC 1274640565
- Murray, A. Maitland. Gerogie M' culloch. Published by Bodley Head and John Lane, London, 1933. OCLC 563054904
- Armstrong, Anthony. The Easy Warriors. Published by Methuen, London, 1932. OCLC 2214990
- Herbert, Alan Patrick. Ballads for Broadbows. Published by Ernest Benn, London, 1930. OCLC 1106679024
- Kipling, Rudyard. The Servant a Dog, told by Boots. Published by Macmillan & Co., London, 1930. OCLC 490614450
- Walker, Joe. That Dog Of Mine. Published by Ward Lock, London and Melbourne, 1930. OCLC 876824195
- Kipling, Rudyard. Supplications of the Black Aberdeen. Published by Doubleday, London and New York, 1929. OCLC 1061914124
- Walker, Joe. My Dog and Yours. Published in London, 1929. OCLC 13415770
- Hastings, Basil Macdonald. Memoirs of a Child. Published by A.M. Philpot, London, 1926. OCLC 11194561
- Cummins, Stevenson Lyle. Plays for Children. Published by Methuen, London, 1922. OCLC 558138789
- Lucas, Edward Verrall. Urbanites; essays new and old. Published by Methuen, London, 1921. OCLC 870335306
- Lucas, Edward Verrall. Specially selected: a choice of essays, with a pictorial commentary. Published by Methuen, London, 1921. OCLC 670190024
- Atkey, Bertram. Easy Money, the genuine book of Henry Mitch, his genuine search for other folk's wealth, and his urgent fear of the feminine. Published by Grant Richards, London, 1908. OCLC 1118995883
