= Massimiliano Stampa =

Italian marquis

Massimiliano Stampa
- Marquess of Soncino
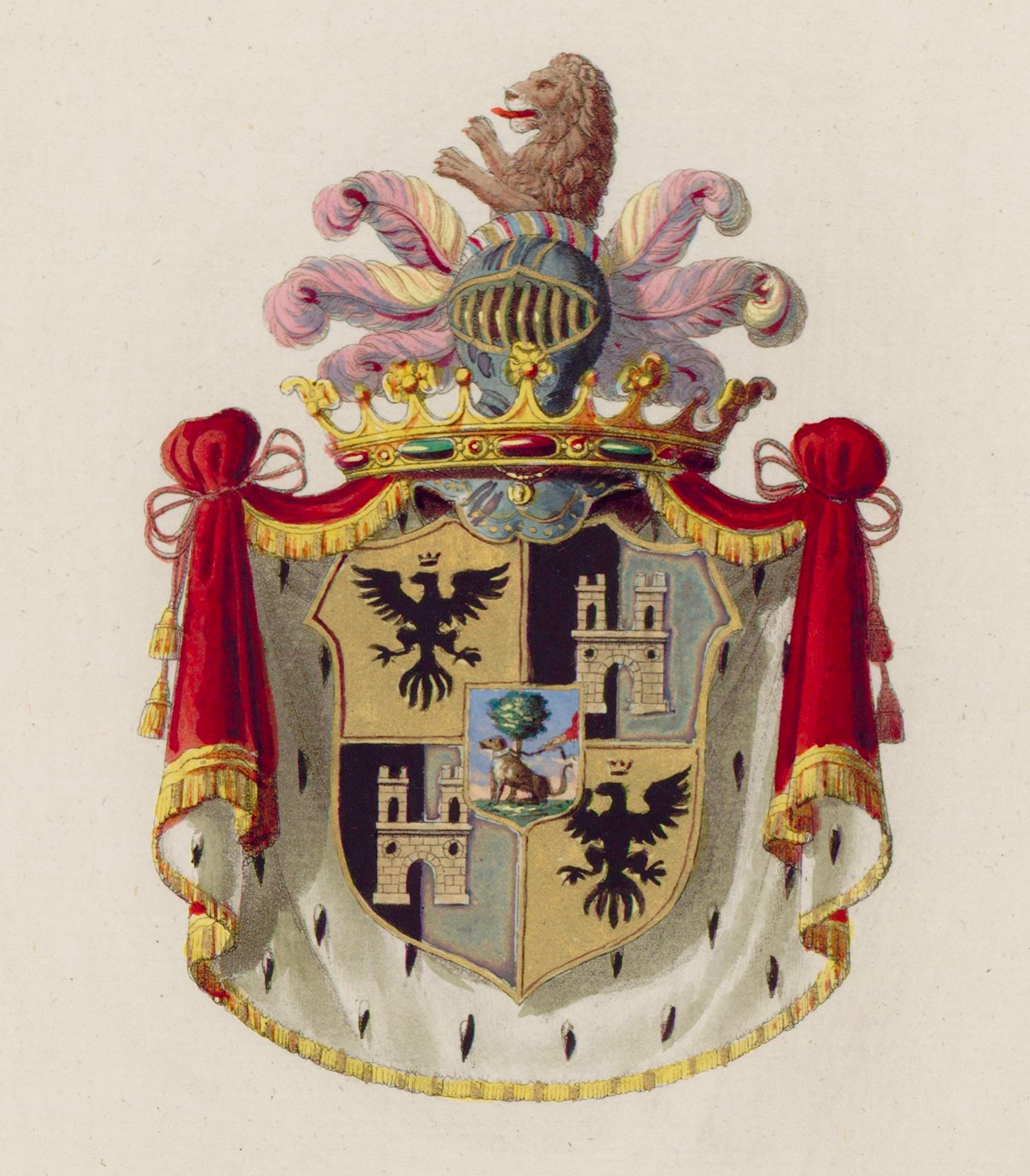
- Successor: Ermes I Stampa
- Born: 1494; Milan
- Died: 15 June 1552 (aged 57–58); Milan
- Buried: 23 August 1543; San Marco, Milan
- Father: Pietro Martire Stampa
- Mother: Barbara Crivelli

Massimiliano Stampa (1494 – Milan, 19 June 1552) was an Italian nobleman and politician, 1st Marquess of Soncino.

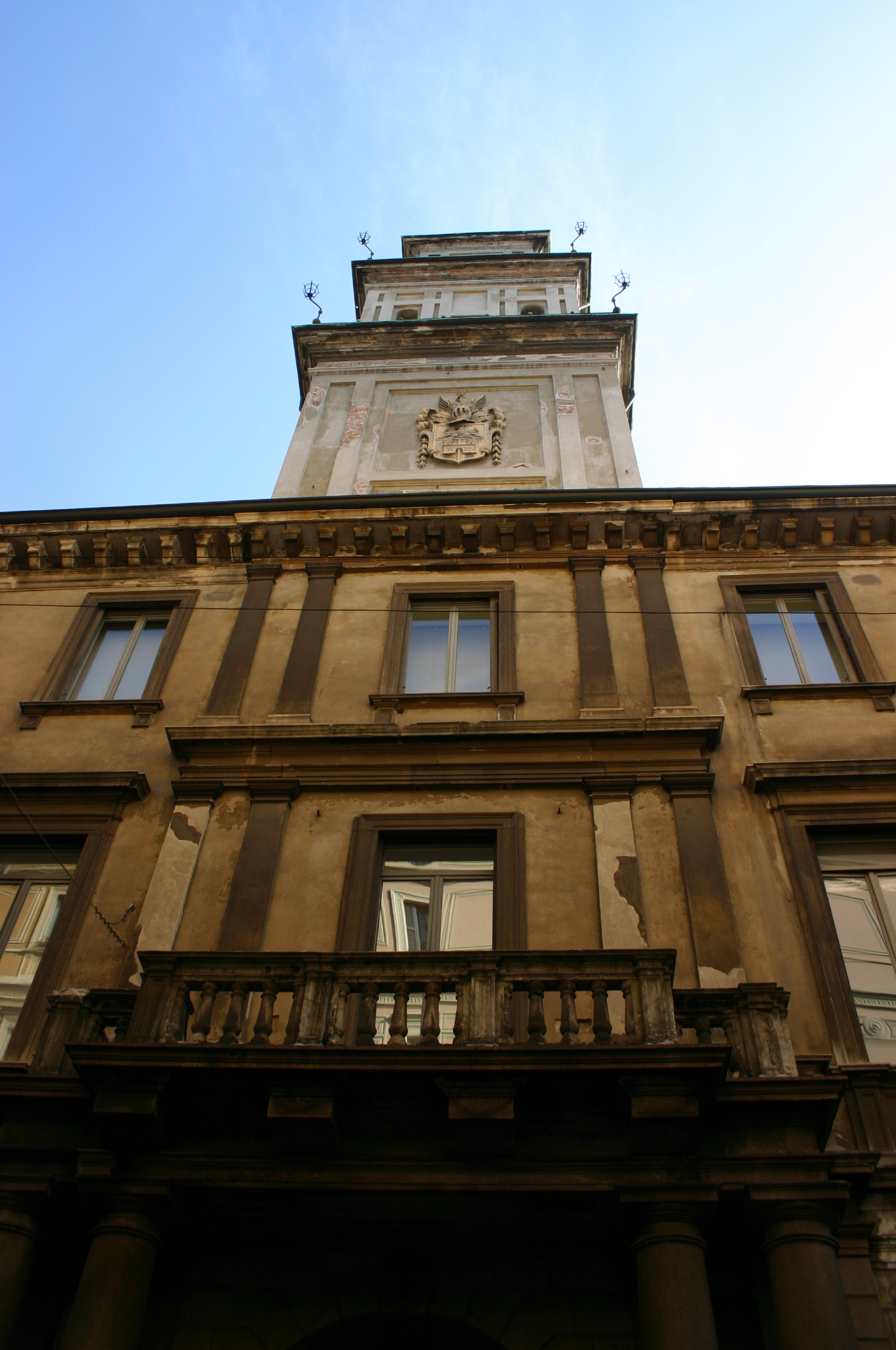
Palazzo Stampa di Soncino, built at the behest of Massimiliano Stampa in the 16th century

== Biography ==
Massimiliano was born into one of the most influential noble families of Milan. His father was Count Pietro Martire Stampa and his mother Countess Barbara Crivelli Stampa.

Massimiliano was a loyal courtier of Francesco II Sforza and castellan of the Sforza Castle from 1531. The Duke held him in high regard, and in 1534 was appointed to accompany the future duchess Christina of Denmark on her first trip to Milan. He also hosted a reception for her in his Cusago Castle, which he bought that same year.

After the death of Francesco II in 1535 the city was about to plunge into chaos, just as it happened when Filippo Maria Visconti died. To avoid disorders, Massimiliano took charge of an embassy and offered Milan to Charles V, Emperor of the Holy Roman Empire. Later that year he was created 1st Marquess of Soncino in recognition.

The Stampa owned many other fiefs, such as Melzo and Gorgonzola, given to Massimiliano by Francesco II. In 1525 he also acquired the fief of Rivolta d'Adda and Castellazzo di Corbetta (later Castellazzo de' Stampi).

After his death in 1552, Massimiliano was buried in the Basilica of San Marco in Milan, and his titles passed to his younger brother, Ermes I, who became 2nd Marquess of Soncino.

== Family Tree ==
Massimiliano I Stampa, 1st Marquess of Soncino	Father: Pietro Martire Stampa, Count of Montecastello	Paternal grandfather: Giovanni Stampa, Count of Montecastello	Paternal great-grandfather Achille Stampa, Milanese patrician	Paternal great-great-grandfather: Giovannolo Stampa
Massimiliano I Stampa, 1st Marquess of Soncino	Father: Pietro Martire Stampa, Count of Montecastello	Paternal grandfather: Giovanni Stampa, Count of Montecastello	Paternal great-grandfather Achille Stampa, Milanese patrician	Paternal great-great-grandmother: ?
Massimiliano I Stampa, 1st Marquess of Soncino	Father: Pietro Martire Stampa, Count of Montecastello	Paternal grandfather: Giovanni Stampa, Count of Montecastello	Paternal great-grandmother: Caterina Grassi	Paternal great-great-grandfather: Ambrogio Grassi
Massimiliano I Stampa, 1st Marquess of Soncino	Father: Pietro Martire Stampa, Count of Montecastello	Paternal grandfather: Giovanni Stampa, Count of Montecastello	Paternal great-grandmother: Caterina Grassi	Paternal great-great-grandmother: ?
Massimiliano I Stampa, 1st Marquess of Soncino	Father: Pietro Martire Stampa, Count of Montecastello	Paternal grandmother: Isabella Visconti	Paternal great-grandfather: Ambrogio Visconti	Paternal great-great-grandfather: Maffiolo Visconti
Massimiliano I Stampa, 1st Marquess of Soncino	Father: Pietro Martire Stampa, Count of Montecastello	Paternal grandmother: Isabella Visconti	Paternal great-grandfather: Ambrogio Visconti	Paternal great-great-grandmother: Caterina de' Capitani
Massimiliano I Stampa, 1st Marquess of Soncino	Father: Pietro Martire Stampa, Count of Montecastello	Paternal grandmother: Isabella Visconti	Paternal great-grandmother: Margherita Visconti	Paternal great-great-grandfather: Giovanni Visconti
Massimiliano I Stampa, 1st Marquess of Soncino	Father: Pietro Martire Stampa, Count of Montecastello	Paternal grandmother: Isabella Visconti	Paternal great-grandmother: Margherita Visconti	Paternal great-great-grandmother: ?
Massimiliano I Stampa, 1st Marquess of Soncino	Mother: Barbara Crivelli	Maternal grandfather: Ugolino Crivelli	Maternal great-grandfather: ?	'Maternal great-great-grandfather ?
Massimiliano I Stampa, 1st Marquess of Soncino	Mother: Barbara Crivelli	Maternal grandfather: Ugolino Crivelli	Maternal great-grandfather: ?	Maternal great-great-grandmother: ?
Massimiliano I Stampa, 1st Marquess of Soncino	Mother: Barbara Crivelli	Maternal grandfather: Ugolino Crivelli	Maternal great-grandmother: ?	Maternal great-great-grandfather: ?
Massimiliano I Stampa, 1st Marquess of Soncino	Mother: Barbara Crivelli	Maternal grandfather: Ugolino Crivelli	Maternal great-grandmother: ?	Maternal great-great-grandmother: ?
Massimiliano I Stampa, 1st Marquess of Soncino	Mother: Barbara Crivelli	Maternal grandmother: ?	Maternal great-grandfather: ?	Maternal great-great-grandfather: ?
Massimiliano I Stampa, 1st Marquess of Soncino	Mother: Barbara Crivelli	Maternal grandmother: ?	Maternal great-grandfather: ?	Maternal great-great-grandmother: ?
Massimiliano I Stampa, 1st Marquess of Soncino	Mother: Barbara Crivelli	Maternal grandmother: ?	Maternal great-grandmother: ?	Maternal great-great-grandfather: ?
Massimiliano I Stampa, 1st Marquess of Soncino	Mother: Barbara Crivelli	Maternal grandmother: ?	Maternal great-grandmother: ?	Maternal great-great-grandmother: ?

== Citations ==
- Beltrami, Luca (1894). "Le costruzioni spagnuole intorno al castello di Milano dal 1548, alla fine del secolo XVII". In Del Mayno, Luchino (ed.). Vicende militari del Castello di Milano dal 1706 al 1848. Milano: Ulrico Hoepli.

== See also ==
- Stampa (family)
- Soncino
- Cusago
