= Palazzo Capponi Stampa =

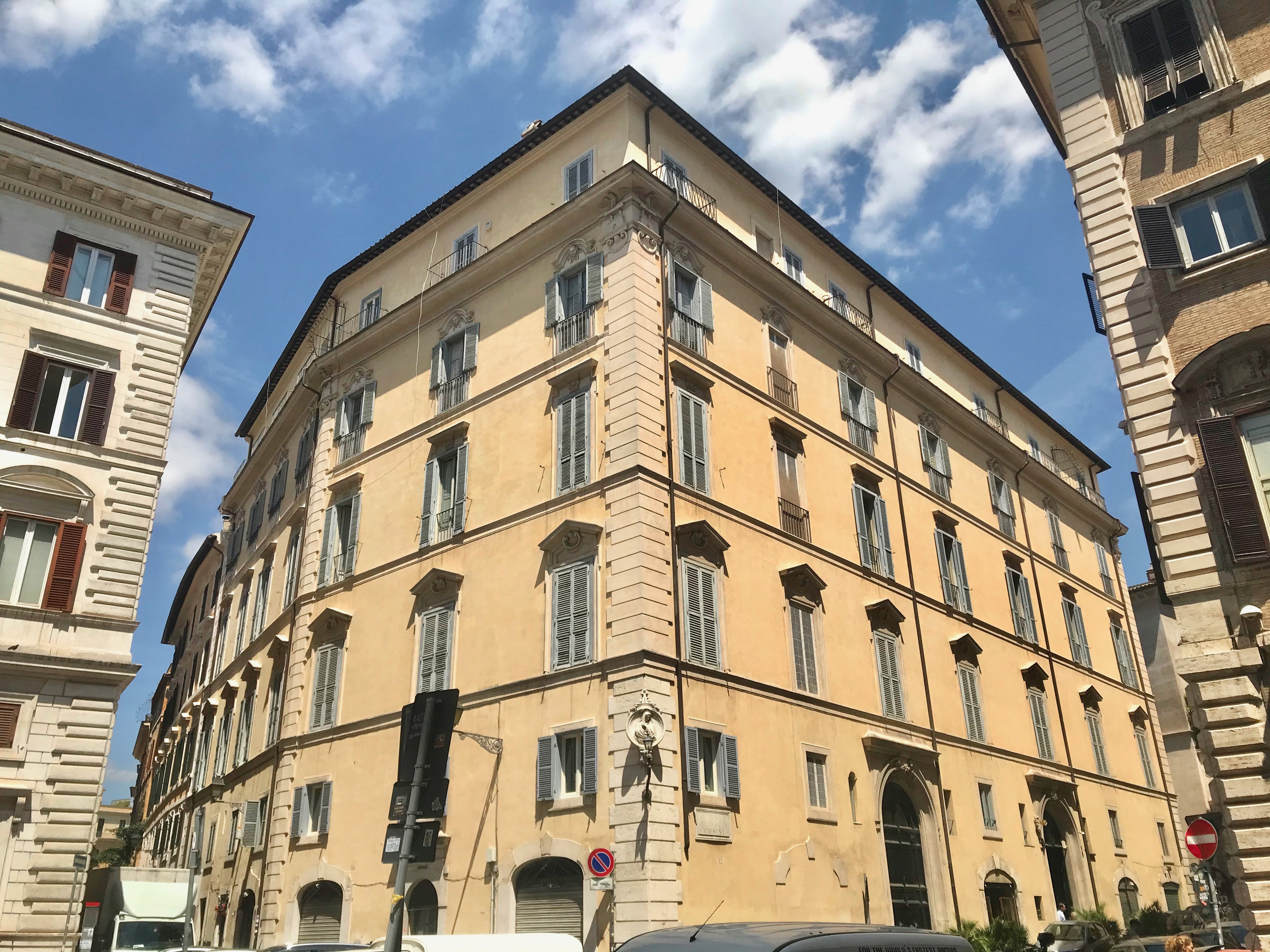
Palazzo Capponi Stampa seen from Piazza dell'Orologio

Palazzo Capponi Stampa, also known as Palazzo Orsini Capponi Stampa Pediconi, is a 17th-century palace in Rome. It sits between Via dei Banchi Nuovi and Via di Panico, overlooking the Piazza dell'Orologio.

== History ==
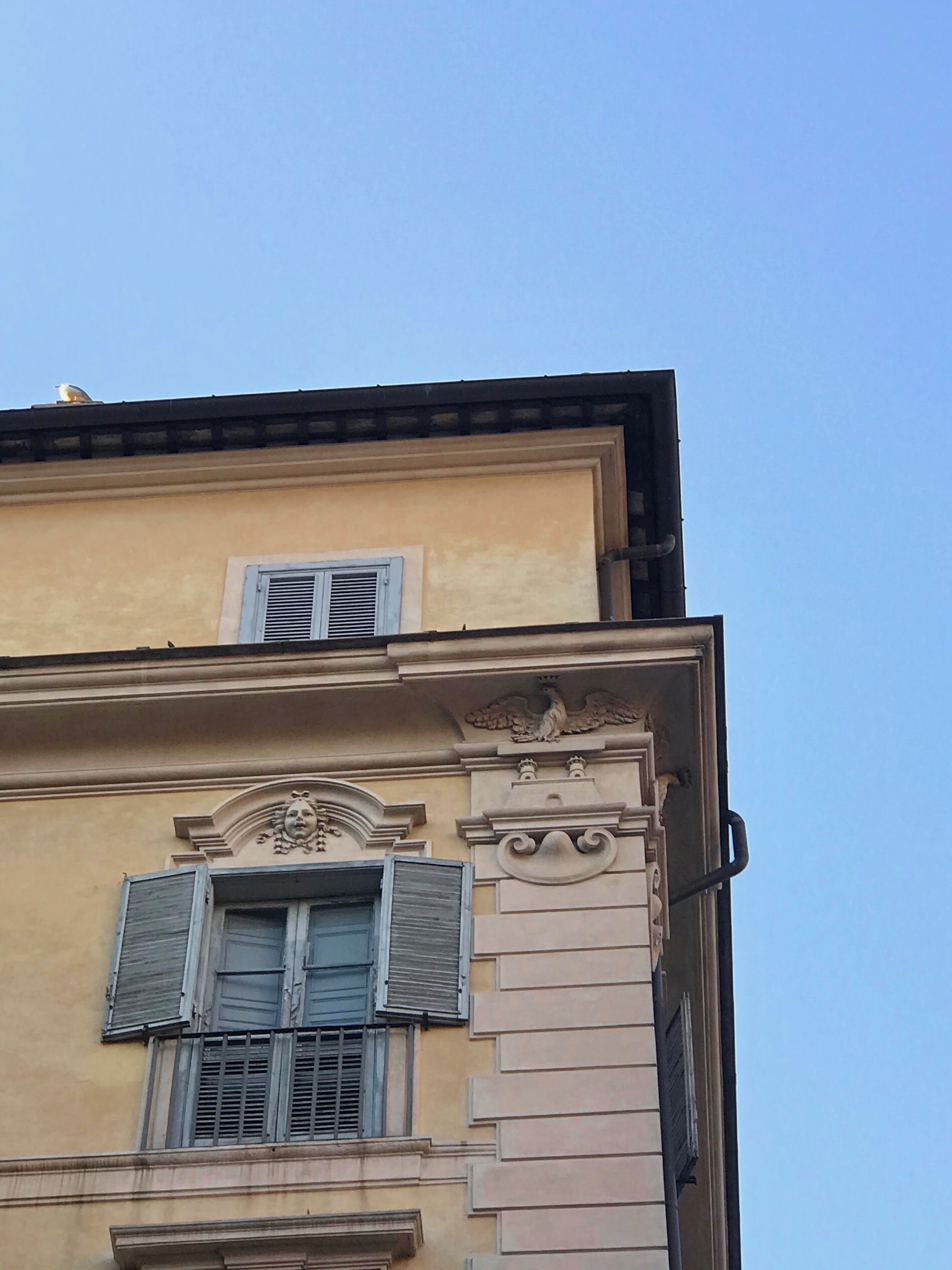
Detail of the capitello with the Stampa coat of arms

The Palace was originally commissioned by the Orsini family. They had another palace nearby, Palazzo Orsini Taverna, so in 1692 they sold it to Cardinal Capponi. In the early years of the 18th century the palace was bought by Cardinal Carlo Gaetano Stampa and renamed Palazzo Stampa. The stucco ornaments were added at the behest of Carlo Gaetano, who had just become Governor of some papal cities. After his death the property was inherited by his cousin Pietro Stampa di Ferentino.

In the following years, the palace hosted members of the Papal States, among them Cardinal Viviano Orfini in 1820 and was also the birthplace of Eugenio Pacelli, later Pope Pius XII.

The building was originally three-storey and a fourth one was added in the 19th century. The facade of the palace looking onto Via Orsini is characterised by cornices underlying windows with trefoil designs, adorned with seashells at the first floor, capitals at the second and female heads at the third. There are two twin doors at the ground floor topped by faun heads, conceived for the entry and exit of carriages. In fact both access a large courtyard with a fountain in the middle, on which is sculpted an eagle – the heraldic emblem of the Stampa.

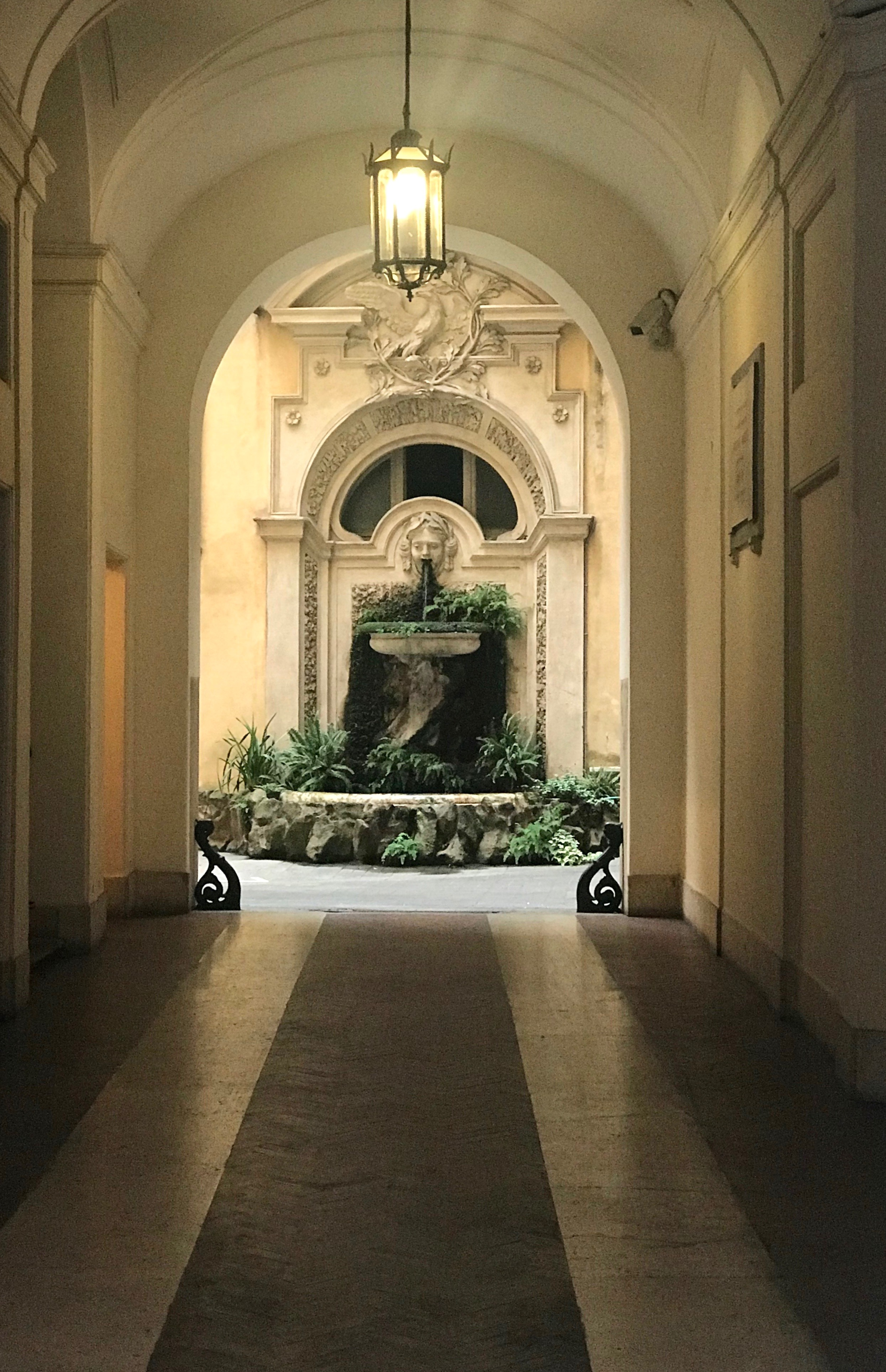
Detail of the main entrance, looking to the courtyard.

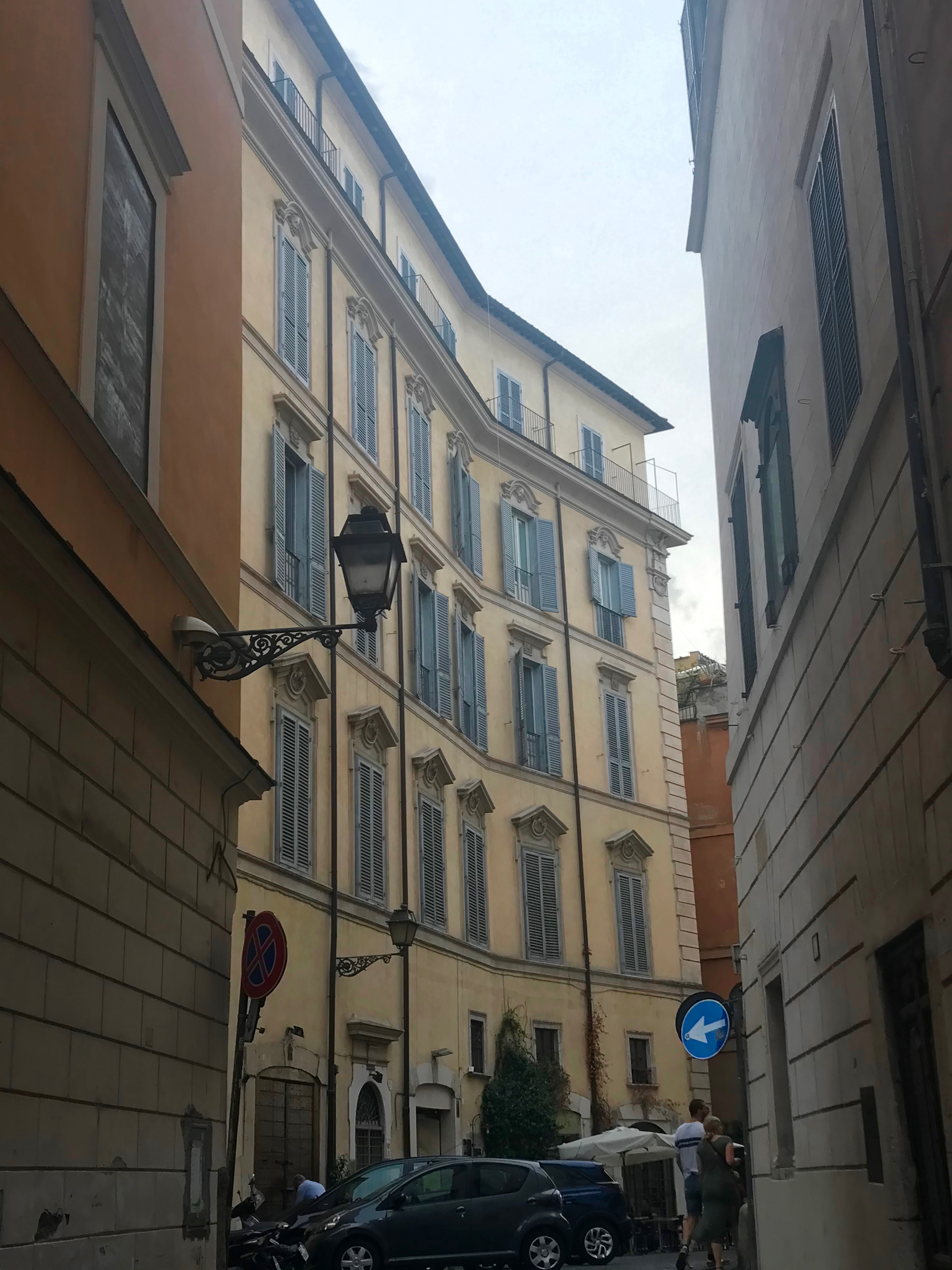
Rear view of the palace, seen from Via di Monte Giordano
