= Gaspara Stampa =

Italian poet (1461–1528)

Gaspara Stampa (Italian pronunciation: [ˈɡaspara ˈstampa]; 1523 – 23 April 1554) was an Italian poet. She is considered to have been the greatest woman poet of the Italian Renaissance, and she is regarded by many as the greatest Italian woman poet of any age.

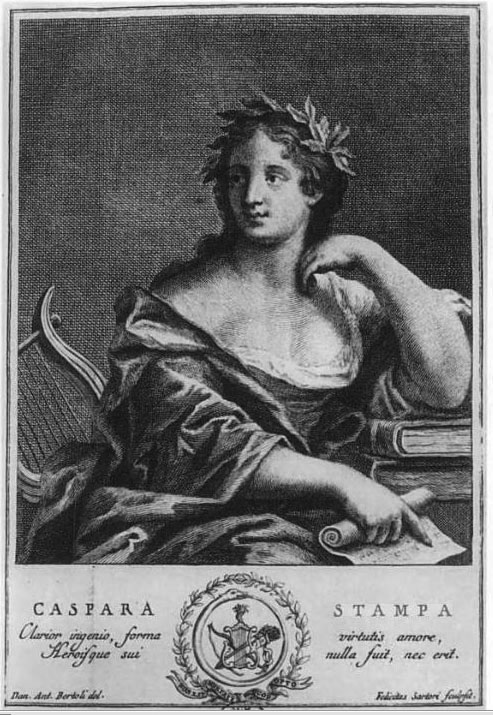
Gaspara Stampa

== Biography ==
Gaspara's father, Bartolomeo, belonged to a cadet branch of the Stampa family. He was a jewel and gold merchant in Padua, where she was born, along with her siblings Cassandra and Baldassarre. When Gaspara was eight, her father died and her mother, Cecilia, moved to Venice with her children, whom she educated in literature, music, history, and painting. Gaspara and Cassandra excelled at singing and playing the lute, possibly due to training by Tuttovale Menon.

Early on, the Stampa household became a literary club, visited by many well-known Venetian writers, painters and musicians. There is evidence that Gaspara herself was a musician who performed madrigals of her own composition.

When her brother died in 1544, Stampa suffered greatly and formed the intention of becoming a nun. However, after a long period of crisis, she came back to "la dolce vita" (the sweet life) in Venice. In 1550, Stampa became a member of the Accademia dei Dubbiosi under the name of "Anaxilla."

At this time, she began a love affair with Count Collaltino di Collalto. It was to him that she eventually dedicated most of the 311 poems she is known to have written. The count's interest apparently cooled, perhaps in part due to his many voyages out of Venice. The relationship broke off in 1551.

Stampa went into a physical prostration and depression, but the result of this period is a collection of beautiful, intelligent and assertive poems in which she triumphs over Collaltino, creating for herself a lasting reputation. She makes clear in her poems that she uses her pain to inspire the poetry, hence her survival and fame.

Between 1551 and 1552, Stampa enjoyed a period of relative tranquility; she began a new relationship with Bartolomeo Zen. During 1553 and 1554, suffering poor health, she spent a few months in Florence, hoping that the milder climate might cure her. She returned to Venice, but became ill with a high fever, and after fifteen days she died on April 23, 1554. The parish register where she lived in Venice records her cause of death as fever, colic and mal de mare (Venetian for "disease of the sea").

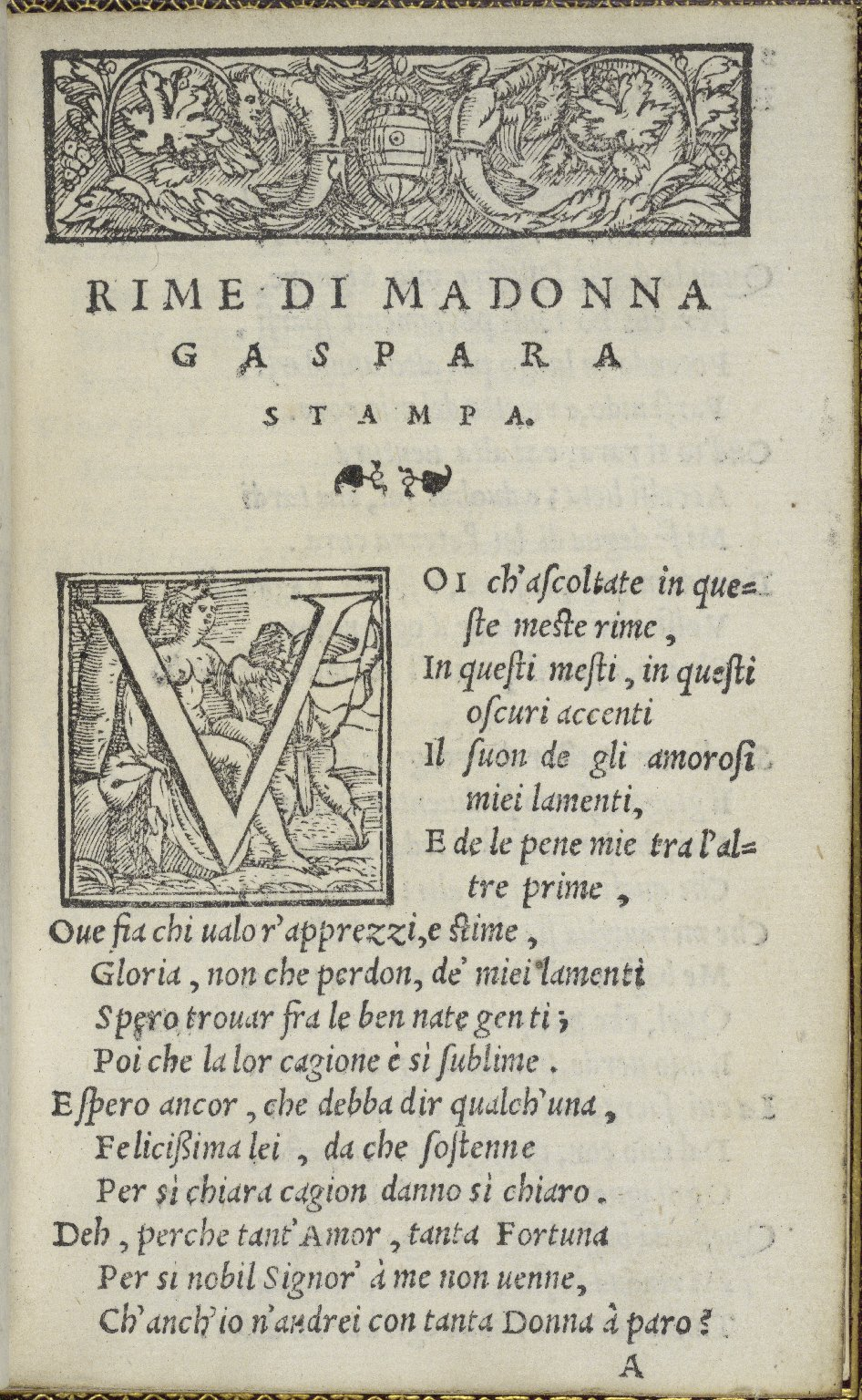
The first page of Gaspara Stampa's Rime, 1554

== Literature ==
The first edition of Gaspara Stampa's poetry, Rime di Madonna Gaspara Stampa, was published posthumously in October 1554 by Venetian printer Plinio Pietrasanta. The collection was edited by her sister Cassandra. It was dedicated to Giovanni Della Casa.

Stampa's collection of poems has a diary form: Gaspara expresses happiness and emotional distress, and her 311 poems are one of the most important collections of female poetry of the 16th century.

The German poet, Rainer Maria Rilke, refers to Gaspara Stampa in the first of his Duino Elegies; which is often considered his greatest work.

== Bibliography ==
- Gaspara Stampa (c.1523-1554), Other Women's Voices, Retrieved on April 17, 2008
- Stampa, Gaspara (2010). The Complete Poems: The 1554 Edition of the "Rime," a Bilingual Edition. Jane Tylus (trans.). Chicago, Illinois: University of Chicago Press. ISBN 978-0-226-77071-0.
- Stefano Bianchi, La scrittura poetica femminile nel Cinquecento veneto: Gaspara Stampa e Veronica Franco, Manziana: Vecchiarelli, 2013. ISBN 978-88-8247-337-2
- Stampa, Gaspara; Lillie, translated by Laura Anna Stortoni & Mary Prentice (1994). Laura Anna Stortoni and Mary Prentice Lillie, ed. Gaspara Stampa: Selected Poems. New York: Italica Press. ISBN 0934977372.
- Laurie Stras, Women and Music in Sixteenth-Century Ferrara, Cambridge Univ Press, 2018 (online), ISBN 9781316650455, online access at https://doi.org/10.1017/9781316650455

== External sources ==
- Some of Gaspara Stampa's poems can be read here: https://web.archive.org/web/20090525095454/http://oldpoetry.com/oauthor/show/Gaspara_Stampa
- Stampa's works are also included in Harold Bloom's Western Canon, Italy:
- Works by Gaspara Stampa at LibriVox (public domain audiobooks)
- Project Continua: Biography of Gaspara Stampa
