= Palazzo Stampa di Soncino, Milan =

The Palazzo Stampa a Soncino is a 16th-century Renaissance-style palace on Via Soncino number 2, corner Via Torino, of Milan, Italy. The palace now has residential apartments and stores.

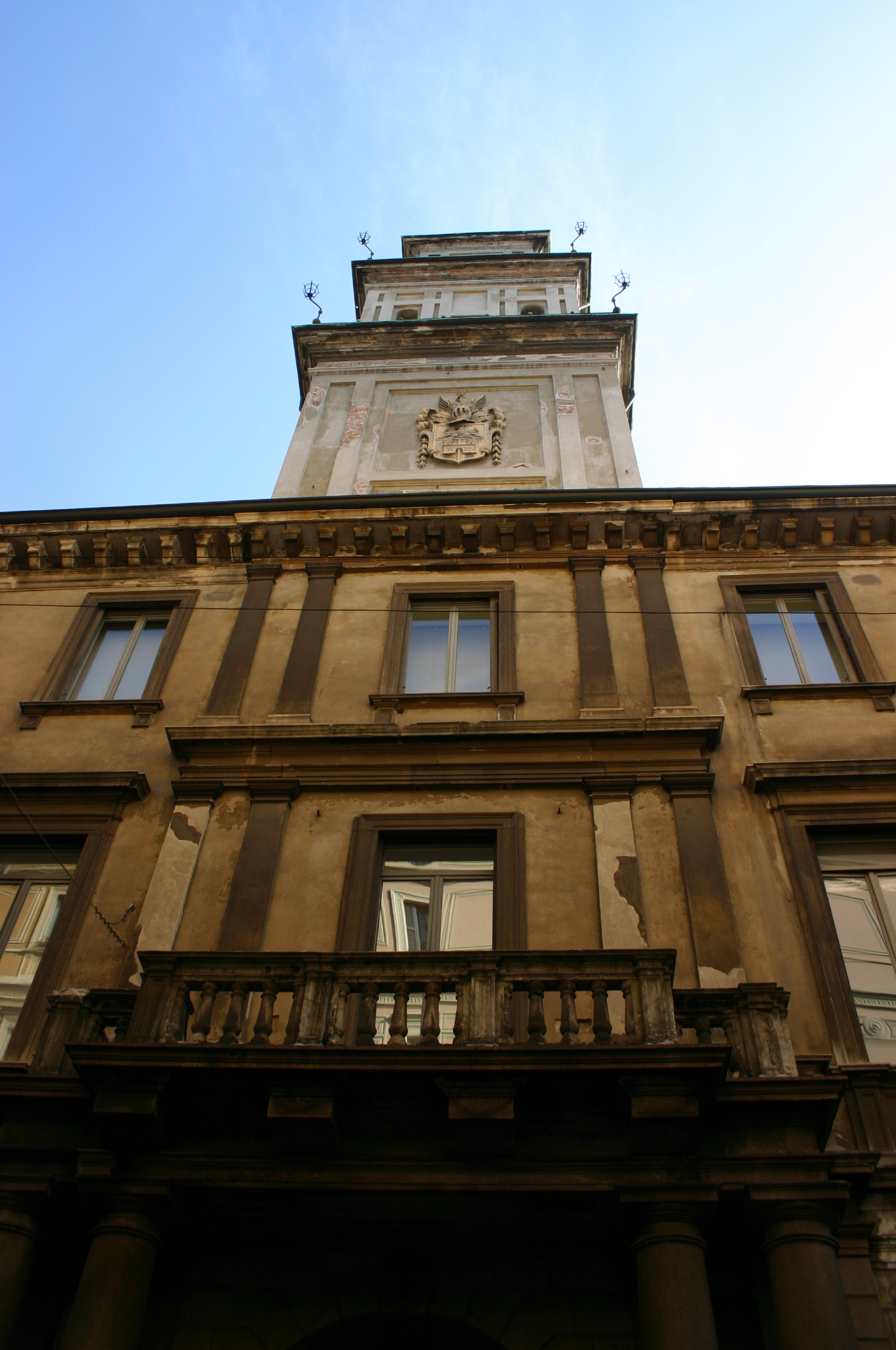
Palazzo Stampa di Soncino in Milan

The palace was commissioned by Massimiliano Stampa, 1st Marquess of Soncino, from the architect Cristoforo Lombardo (died circa 1550). The three-story palace encompasses the entire block; the facade, on a narrow street, is dominated by a central five story square-plan tower, arising from the courtyard. Further additions and enlargements were pursued over the centuries since the original construction. The shield on the tower has the imperial House of Habsburg eagle, singling the support given by Stampa to the rule of Milan by Charles V, Holy Roman Emperor.
