= Soncino, Lombardy =

Soncino Sunsì (Lombard)
- Comune
- Città di Soncino
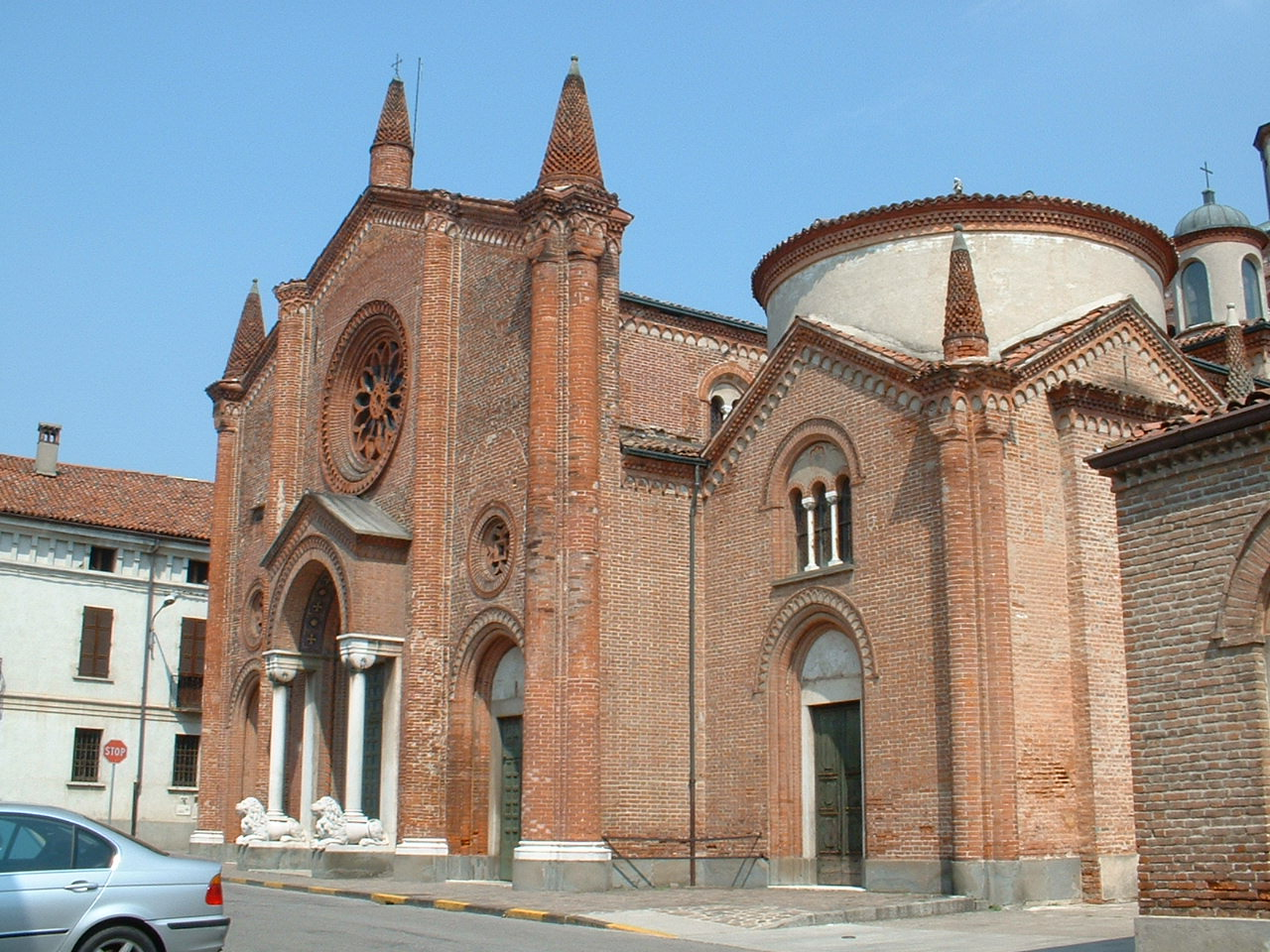
- Pieve of Santa Maria Assunta.

- Coat of arms

- Location within Lombardy Location within Italy
- Coordinates: 45°24′N 9°52′E
- Country: Italy
- Region: Lombardy
- Province: Cremona (CR)
- Frazioni: Gallignano, Isengo, Villacampagna

Government
  - Mayor: Gabriele Gallina

Area
  - Total: 45.3 km^{2} (17.5 sq mi)
- Elevation: 89 m (292 ft)

Population (28 February 2017)
  - Total: 7,655
  - Density: 169/km^{2} (438/sq mi)
- Demonym: Soncinesi
- Time zone: UTC+1 (CET)
  - Summer (DST): UTC+2 (CEST)
- Postal code: 26029
- Dialing code: 0374
- Patron saint: St. Martin
- Website: Official website

Soncino (Lombard: Sunsì) is a comune (municipality) in the Province of Cremona in the Italian region Lombardy, located about 60 kilometres (37 mi) east of Milan and about 30 kilometres (19 mi) northwest of Cremona.

Soncino borders the following municipalities: Casaletto di Sopra, Cumignano sul Naviglio, Fontanella, Genivolta, Orzinuovi, Roccafranca, Ticengo, Torre Pallavicina and Villachiara. It is located on the banks of the river Oglio.

It is one of I Borghi più belli d'Italia ("The most beautiful villages of Italy"). Soncino received the honorary title of city with a presidential decree on 18 November 2004.

== Main sights ==
The Sforza Castle in Soncino

- The well-preserved Castle (Rocca Sforzesca), first built around 1000 and then expanded and elaborated upon in 1473 for Galeazzo Maria Sforza. It has three square towers and a round one. It has been chosen as set for movies like Ladyhawke and Il mestiere delle armi.
- The church of San Giacomo and the annexed former Dominican convent, with an octagonal pending tower.
- The church of Santa Maria Assunta (12th century).
- The Town Hall with the Civic Tower.
- The Casa degli Stampatori ("Printers' House"), where, in 1488, the first complete Hebrew Bible in the world was printed by the Soncino family.
- The Renaissance Santa Maria delle Grazie, with a fine interior.

== Cultural events ==
Every two years Soncino plays host to the two Soncino Biennale art exposition displaying get work of artists from around the globe. The exhibition is most frequently held in the city's historic centre, including such locations as Soncino's Castle and the Palazzo Stampa di Soncino.
