= Lady in a Fur Wrap =

Painting attributed to Alonso Sánchez Coello

- La dama de armiño
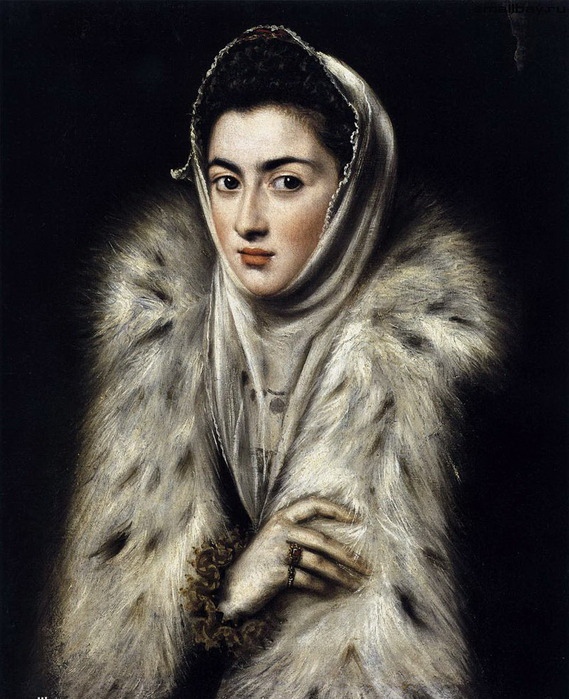
- Year: 1580–1588
- Medium: canvas
- Dimensions: 62 cm (24 in) × 50 cm (20 in)
- Location: Pollok House
- Accession no.: PC.18
- Identifiers: Art UK artwork ID: lady-in-a-fur-wrap-86230

Lady in a Fur Wrap is an oil painting now generally attributed to Alonso Sánchez Coello, dated between 1580 and 1588 and now held at Pollok House in Glasgow. The identity of the sitter is uncertain, theories suggest the portrait to be a depiction of Catalina Micaela of Spain or Juana de Mendoza, Duchess of Béjar

== Description ==
Against a dark background a young woman gazes at the viewer, dressed in a fur robe covering the rest of her dress. A fine transparent veil covers her head, and vaguely a necklace can be seen that she is wearing underneath it. The robe falls into darkness behind its fur lining, that may be ermine or lynx. The painting is unsigned but has traditionally been attributed to El Greco since it was in the Spanish gallery of French king Louis Philippe I and hung at the Louvre. It was purchased by Sir William Stirling-Maxwell, 9th Baronet at the King's estate sale of his Spanish gallery in 1853. It was bequeathed to the city of Glasgow along with Pollok House by his heirs in 1966.

The painting's attribution has been brought into question and some, such as art historian Maria Kusche, have claimed it is by Sofonisba Anguissola. The sitter is also unknown, but considering the painting's royal provenance, the value of the fur and the jeweled necklace, various guesses have been made based on her widow's peak that it could be someone from Philip II's royal family.

Following an investigation by the Museo del Prado, Glasgow Museums and the University of Glasgow the painting is no longer thought to be by El Greco, and generally attributed to Alonso Sánchez Coello.

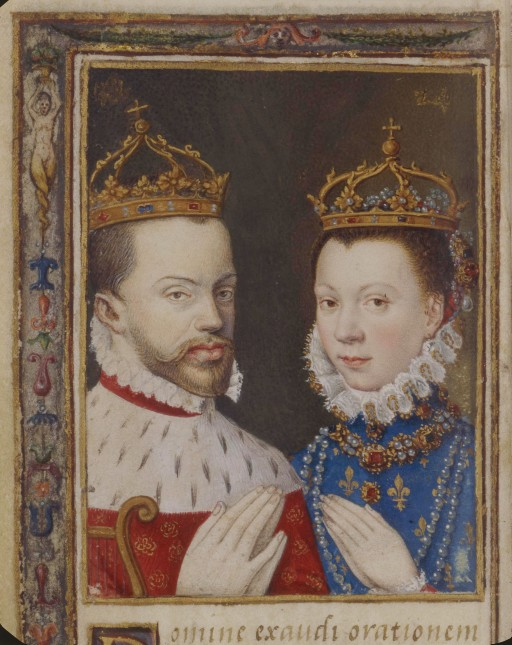
Double Portrait of Philip II of Spain and Elizabeth of Valois, Bibliothèque Nationale de France

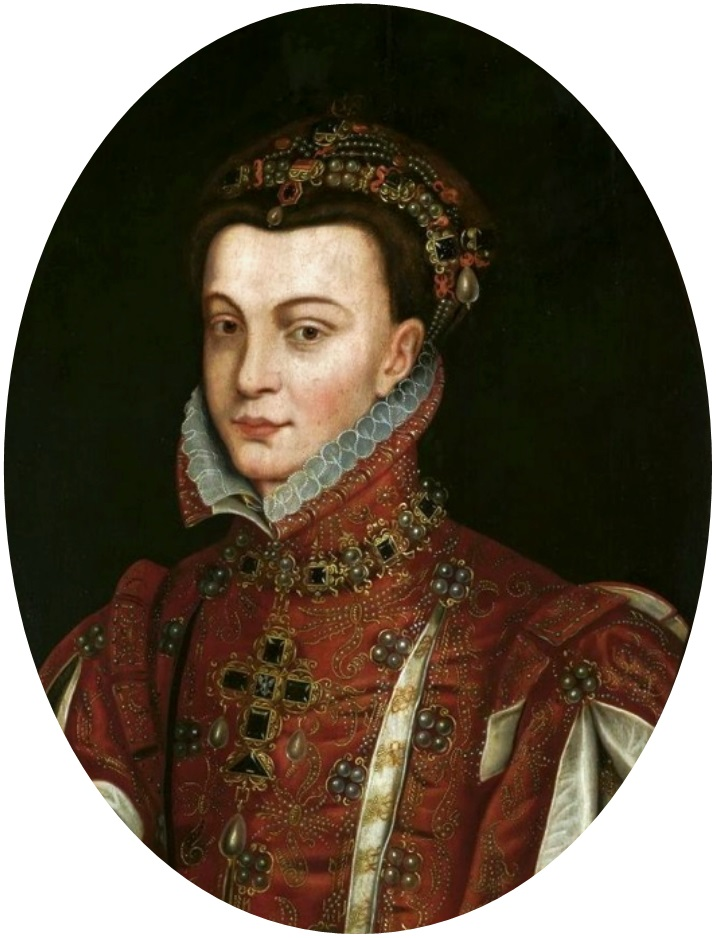
Portrait of Elizabeth of Valois National Museum in Warsaw

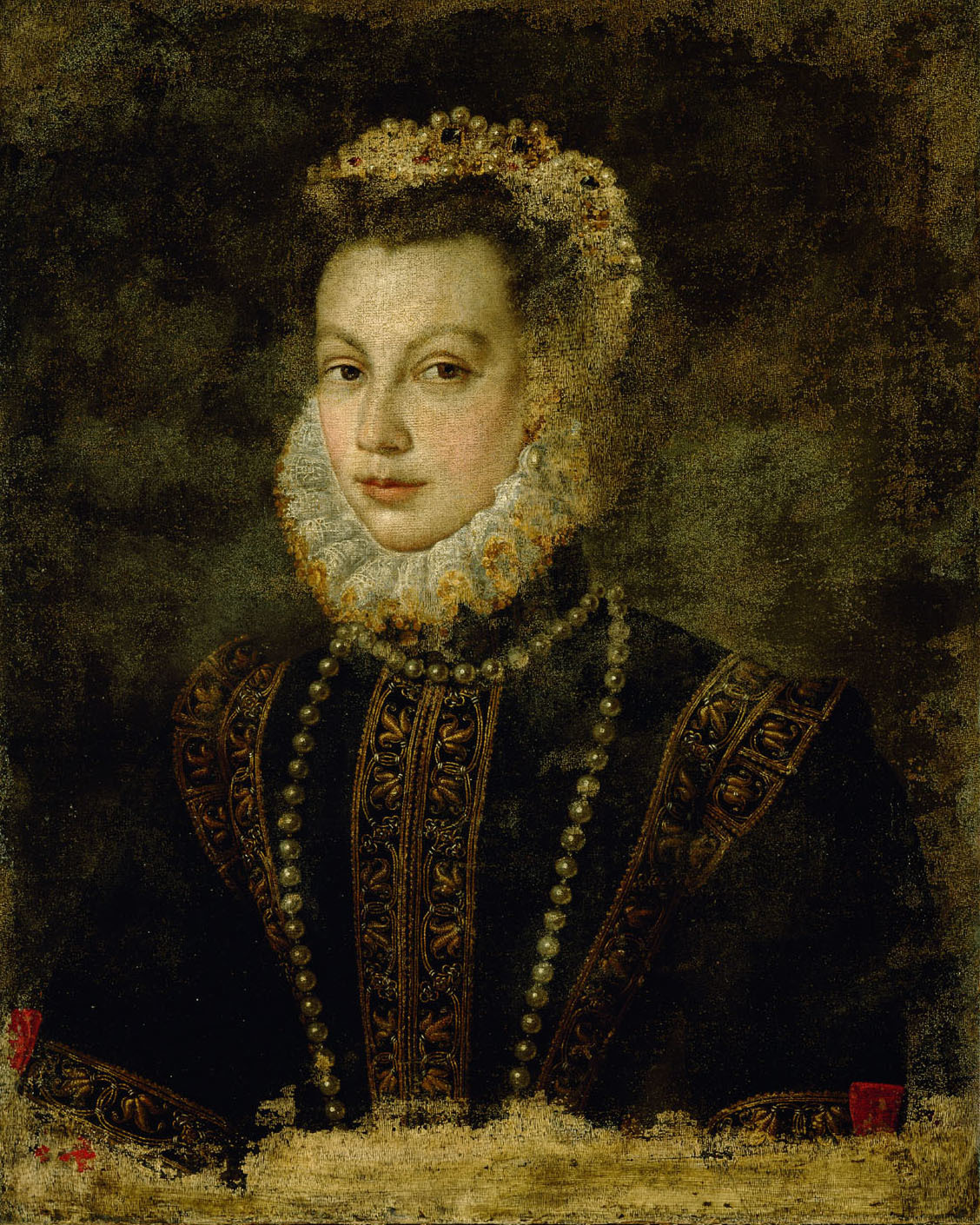
Portrait of Elizabeth of Valois, by Sofonisba Anguissola Museo del Prado

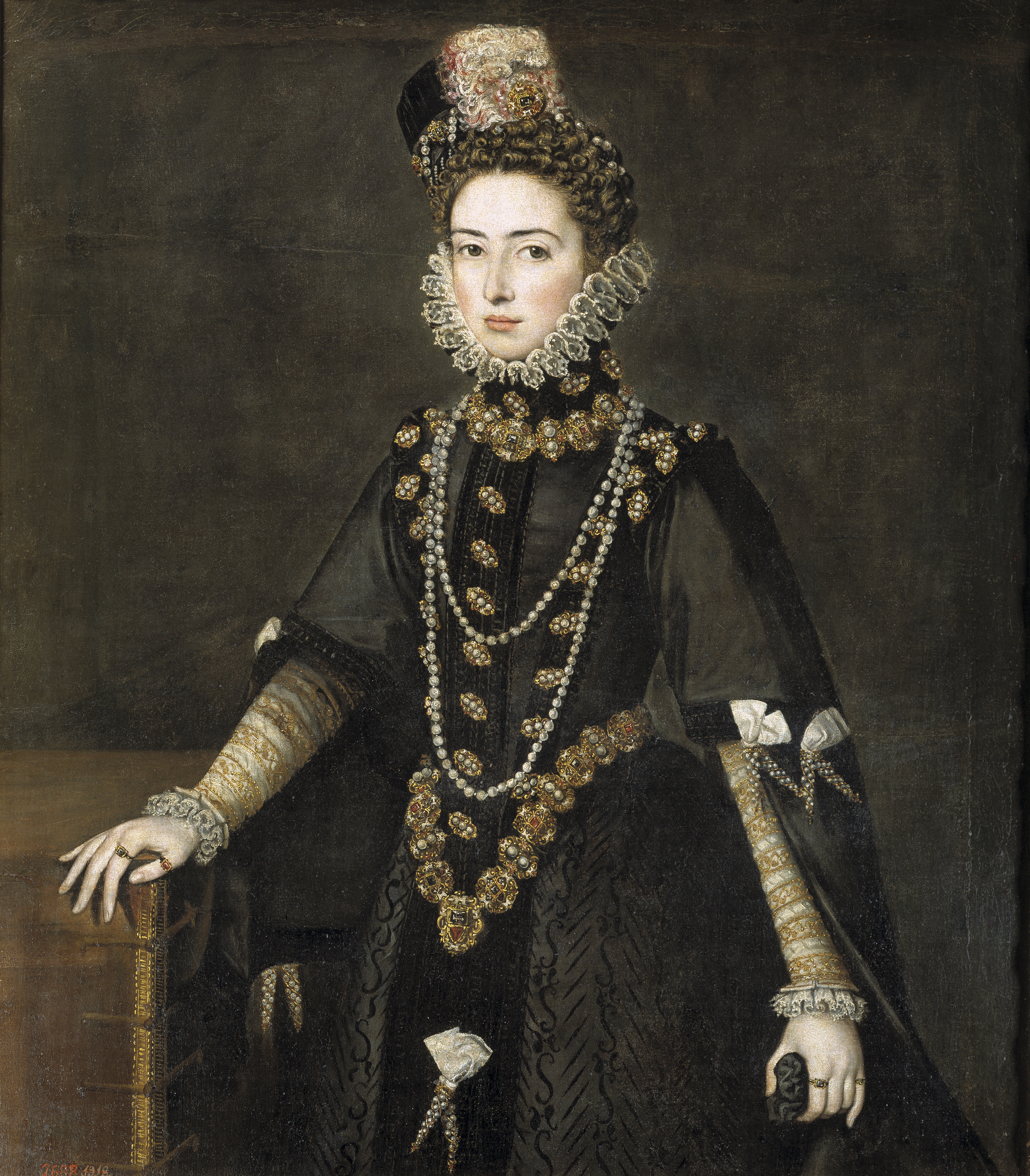
Portrait of Caterina Micaela by Alonso Sánchez Coello Museo del Prado

== In film ==
The 1947 dramatic film Lady in Ermine makes the painting the work of El Greco and the sitter, his (fictional) daughter Catalina.

== See also ==
- Portrait of Infanta Isabella Clara Eugenia (Anguissola)
