= Maria Kusche =

Spanish art historian

Maria Kusche (1928–2012) was a Spanish art historian of German descent, a specialist on painters at the royal court of Philip II of Spain, in particular Sofonisba Anguissola, Juan Pantoja de la Cruz, and Alonso Sánchez Coello.

== Biography ==
Maria Kusche was born in 1928 in Málaga, to German parents who had emigrated and met in Málaga. Her father, Ernesto (born Ernst) Kusche (1878–1965), was a business leader and co-founder of Baquera, Kusche & Martin S.A. (Bakumar) which at one point was viewed as the biggest terrestrial and maritime transport and customs company in Spain. A street near Málaga Airport (Calle Ernesto Kusche) still bears his name. Her mother, born Elisabeth Strandes (1892–1967), was a daughter of merchant and Hamburg Senator Justus Strandes.

Kusche studied art history at Complutense University of Madrid with professors Francisco Javier Sánchez Cantón and José Manuel Pita Andrade and went on in Germany at University of Freiburg, University of Marburg, and eventually University of Bonn where she completed her Doctorate work on 16th-century court painter Juan Pantoja de la Cruz, supervised by Herbert von Einem.

In 1963 she married Winfried Zettelmeyer, a development economist, and subsequently followed him to live in various African and Latin American countries. They had two sons, Jeromin (born 1964) and Florian (born 1968), who both also became social science scholars.

== Research ==
Kusche was a leading scholar on Sofonisba Anguissola, a prominent woman artist of the 16th century. In 1992 she identified the Prado's Portrait of Infanta Isabella Clara Eugenia, currently held at the Spanish embassy in Paris, as being painted by Anguissola.

Kusche successfully questioned the traditional attribution to El Greco of the Lady in a Fur Wrap, an iconic portrait formerly at Louis Philippe I's Spanish gallery at the Louvre and held since 1853 at Pollok House in Glasgow. In a 1990 lecture at the Museo del Prado, she identified it instead as a portrait of Catalina Micaela of Spain by Anguissola, developing earlier arguments made by Elías Tormo in 1913 and Carmen Bernis Madrazo in 1986. A later radiography analysis confirmed her stylistic arguments against El Greco's authorship, even though its authors opted to attribute the painting to Alonso Sánchez Coello.

== Selected works ==
- Wo die Maultiertreiber singen. Eine Familiengeschichte aus Andalusien, Recklinghausen: Georg Bitter Verlag, 1987, ISBN 9783790303520
- Sofonisba Anguissola: A Renaissance Woman (with Sylvia Ferino-Pagden), Washington DC: National Museum of Women in the Arts, 1995, ISBN 9780940979314
- Retratos y retratadores : Alonso Sánchez Coello y sus competidores Sofonisba Anguissola, Jorge de la Rúa y Rolán Moys, Madrid: Fundación de Apoyo a la Historia del arte Hispánico, 2003, ISBN 9788493289140
- Juan Pantoja de La Cruz y sus seguidores. Bartolomé González, Rodrigo de Villandrando y Antonio López Polanco, Madrid: Fundación de Apoyo a la Historia del Arte Hispánico, 2007, ISBN 978-84-935054-2-4
- Preface of Hora temprana. Poemas y cartas, a collection of poems by Sol Acín (edited by Ismael Gracia), Zaragoza: Prensas de la Universidad de Zaragoza, 2014, ISBN 978-8415770473. Maria Kusche was Acín's lifelong friend and correspondent.
