= Lady in Ermine =

1947 Spanish film

- Directed by: Eusebio Fernández Ardavín
- Written by: Luis Fernández Ardavín (play); Rafael Gil
- Starring: Lina Yegros; Jorge Mistral; Alicia Palacios
- Cinematography: Manuel Berenguer
- Edited by: Gaby Peñalba
- Music by: Jesús García Leoz
- Production company: Suevia Films
- Distributed by: Suevia Films
- Release date: 3 November 1947
- Running time: 102 minutes
- Country: Spain
- Language: Spanish

Lady in Ermine (Spanish: La dama del armiño) is a 1947 Spanish historical drama film directed by Eusebio Fernández Ardavín and starring Lina Yegros, Jorge Mistral and Alicia Palacios. It is based on a 1922 play by his brother Luis, which portrays a fictitious relationship between the daughter of the painter El Greco and a young Jewish goldsmith in sixteenth century Toledo.

The film was made by Suevia Films, one of the dominant Spanish production companies of the era. It was shot at the Sevilla Film Studios in Madrid, with sets designed by the art director Enrique Alarcón.

== Plot summary ==
During the reign of Philip II of Spain, Catalina poses in ermine furs for his father, who is painting Lady in a Fur Wrap. Jews Samuel the young, Abraham and Job go to the Corpus Christi procession in Toledo, Spain to admire the monstrance. They feign being Christians to be inconspicuous. When the Theotokopouloses go to the windows to venerate the body of Christ, Samuel sees Catalina and falls in love with her. Don Luis courts Catalina but is barely tolerated. The old painter wants to reward his daughter with a jewel and sends her and Gregoria to the workshop of both Samuels. Don Luis leaves Catalina and Gregoria at the shop, where they meet Samuel the young, who gallantly woos her. Since Don Luis did not make his appointment to escort them home, Samuel takes the women there. When he returns, he praises Catalina, ignoring the love of Jarifa. He claims to believe in his art rather than any god. Andrés feels outraged and quits the workshop.

Don Luis is displeased that the ladies have left and quarrels with Samuel. They fight and Don Luis takes the worst wounds. Andrés denounces Samuel to the Inquisition for attempting the murder of a Christian noble.

Samuel and Catalina know that the religion is a barrier for their love. Samuel visits El Greco's house so that he and Catalina can choose a jewel. Meanwhile, the Inquisition takes Samuel the old prisoner and go to El Greco's house to find his son. Catalina hides Samuel in her room through the night when they fell to temptation. Gregoria arranges for Samuel to escape to Lisbon but, when he hears that his father is in prison, he returns to Toledo and is arrested. His father is released but dies soon. Samuel has started to accept Christianity out of love for Catalina. He is instructed by Friar Paravicino, who has become his lawyer. Don Luis's declaration before the Inquisition does not help Samuel in spite of Catalina's requests. The chief inquisitor poses for his portrait and hears Catalina's plaint. Samuel is baptized and works in the prison to make a magnificent monstrance.

Another Corpus feast arrives. El Greco, Paravicino and Don Luis gather in the painter's house anticipating Catalina's joy. When the procession passes before the house, everybody admires the new monstrance. A free Samuel leaves the procession to embrace Catalina. Jarifa sees them from a distance and disappears leaving a lamp by a well.

== Cast ==
- Lina Yegros as Catalina. Daughter of El Greco.
- Jorge Mistral as Samuel, el joven. Jewish master silversmith, son of Samuel the old.
- Alicia Palacios as Jarifa, la morisca. Morisco slave.
- Julia Lajos as Gregoria, la dueña.
- Fernando Fernández de Córdoba as Fray Hortensio Paraviccino
- José Prada as El Greco. Old master painter.
- Eduardo Fajardo as Don Luis Tristán. Noble apprentice of El Greco and suitor of Catalina.
- Arturo Marín as Abraham. Jewish silversmith.
- Félix Fernández as Job. Jewish silversmith.
- José Jaspe as Andrés. Christian silversmith, suitor of Jarifa and envious of Samuel the young.
- Fernando Fresno as Samuel el Viejo. Silversmith and father of Samuel the young.
- Ricardo Calvo (actor)

== Accuracy ==
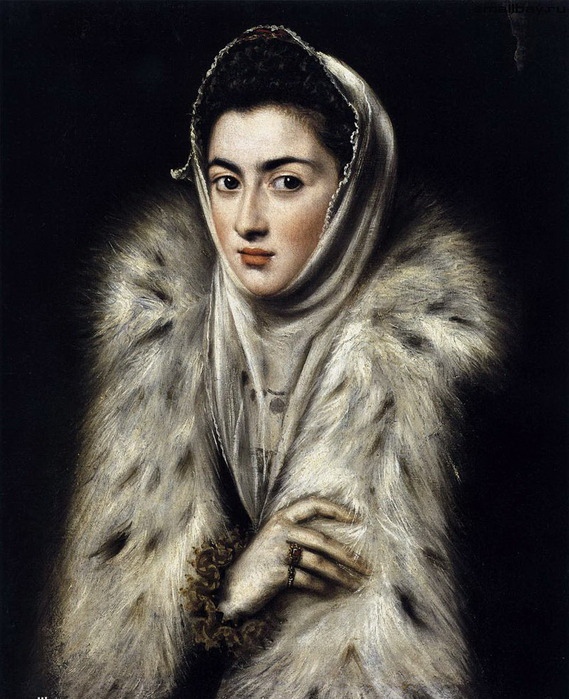
Lady in a Fur Wrap was traditionally attributed to El Greco, but later research has pointed to Alonso Sánchez Coello or Sofonisba Anguissola.

The existence of a daughter of El Greco is not documented. The Jews were expelled from Spain in 1492. Any Jews in Spain were either illegal aliens or lapsed Conversos to be punished by the Spanish Inquisition, not a tolerated minority as depicted in the film.

== Trivia ==
There is a novel titled Lady in Ermine: The Story of a Woman Who Painted the Renaissance (2019), about the life of Renaissance artist Sofonisba Anguissola, by Donna DiGiuseppe

== Bibliography ==
- Mira, Alberto. The Cinema of Spain and Portugal. Wallflower Press, 2005.
