= Jeromin Zettelmeyer =

German economist (born 1964)

- Born: 1964 (age 61–62); Madrid
- Occupation: economist
- Known for: Director of Bruegel (2022-)

Jeromin Zettelmeyer (born 1964 in Madrid) is a German economist and the current Director of Bruegel, a position he has held since September 2022. His career is distinguished by prominent roles in international financial institutions and economic policy bodies. Prior to leading Bruegel, Zettelmeyer served as a deputy director of the Strategy and Policy Review Department at the International Monetary Fund (IMF).

== Biography ==
Jeromin is the first son of German development economist Winfried Zettelmeyer and art historian Maria Kusche. His brother Florian was born in 1968.

Zettelmeyer's academic background includes a Ph.D. in economics from MIT (1995) and an economics degree from the University of Bonn (1990). He has also held visiting student positions at Oxford University and is fluent in English, Spanish, and German.

His earlier tenure at the IMF spanned 1994 to 2008, where he contributed to several departments. Then, he became the Director of Research and Deputy Chief Economist at the European Bank for Reconstruction and Development (EBRD) from 2008 to 2014, and subsequently served as Director-General for Economic Policy at the German Federal Ministry for Economic Affairs and Energy from 2014 to 2016. He also spent time as a Senior Fellow and Dennis Weatherstone Senior Fellow at the Peterson Institute for International Economics.

As a prolific scholar, he is a Research Fellow in the International Macroeconomics Programme of the Centre for Economic Policy Research (CEPR) and a member of CESIfo. His extensive published research focuses on critical areas of international economics, including financial crises, sovereign debt, economic growth, transition to market economies, and Europe's monetary union (EMU). His recent research interests include EMU economic architecture, debt and climate, and the return of economic nationalism.

== Publications ==
Beyond dozens of scientific articles, he has published a couple of monographs:

- Climate and Debt (with B. Weder di Mauro, U. Panizza, M. Gulati, L. Buchheit and P. Bolton), 2022, Geneva Reports on the World Economy 25 (CEPR Press, London).
- Debt Defaults and Lessons from a Decade of Crises (with Federico Sturzenegger), 2007 (Cambridge, Mass.: MIT Press)
