= Felipe de Liaño =

Spanish painter

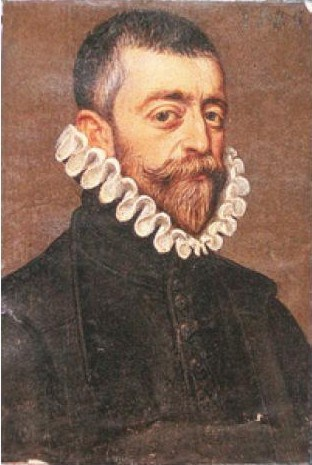
Felipe-de-liaño

Felipe de Liaño (died 1625) was a Spanish painter. dubbed him . He was dubbed Little Titian (Tiziano pequeño) by Spanish painter Antonio Palomino.

Born in Madrid, he was pupil of Alonso Sánchez Coello, and may have completed some etchings in Italy that are signed “Teodoro Felipe de Liagno”. He painted the portrait of Álvaro de Bazán, first Marquese de Santa Cruz for the emperor Rudolf II. Lope de Vega in his poetic epitaph stated that “Nature killed him because he stole its paintbrushes”.
