= Francisco Javier Sánchez Cantón =

Spanish art historian (1891–1971)

Excelentísimo Señor Don Francisco Javier Sánchez Cantón OIC OAXS
- Born: Francisco Javier Sánchez Cantón; 14 July 1891; Pontevedra, Spain
- Died: 27 November 1971 (aged 80); Pontevedra, Spain

Seat N of the Real Academia Española
- In office 4 December 1949 – 27 November 1971
- Preceded by: Manuel Machado
- Succeeded by: Torcuato Luca de Tena Brunet

Francisco Javier Sánchez Cantón (1891–1971) was a Spanish art historian, who from 1960 to 1968 was Director of the Museo del Prado.

== Life ==
Born in Pontevedra, Galicia (Spain), on 14 July 1891, in 1913 he obtained a doctorate from the Central University, Madrid, with a thesis on Los pintores de cámara de los reyes de España (published in 1916). He started work at the Museo del Prado the same year. He was also attached to the Centro de Estudios Históricos (now Instituto Diego Velázquez of the Spanish National Research Council), and was for some years the editor-in-chief of the journal Archivo Español de Arte. In 1929 he curated an exhibition of the work of Anton Raphael Mengs at the Prado.

During the Spanish Civil War he was active in conserving the Prado's collections. In 1943 he became director of the Instituto Padre Sarmiento de Estudios Gallegos and editor-in-chief of its journal, Cuadernos de Estudios Gallegos. In the same year, he was appointed to the chair of General Art History at the University of Madrid, going on to serve as vice-rector of the university from 1950 to 1958.

He was elected to the Real Academia de Bellas Artes de San Fernando in 1925, the Real Academia de la Historia in 1934, and the Real Academia Española in 1949. In 1956 he became director of the second, and in 1966 director of the first. In 1960 he was appointed Director of the Prado Museum, and at his retirement in 1968 he was appointed honorary director. He died on 27 November 1971.

== Works ==
- with Elías Tormo, Los tapices de la Casa del Rey (1919)
- with Juan Allende-Salazar Zaragoza, Retratos del Museo del Prado. Identificación y rectificaciones (Madrid, 1919)
- Fuentes literarias para la historia del arte español (5 volumes, 1923–1941)
- Guías del Museo del Prado. I. Salas de pintura francesa (Madrid, 1925)
- L'Espagne. Madrid, Patronato Nacional del Turismo, 1926.
- with Félix Boix, Goya. I. Cien dibujos inéditos (1928)
- Guías del Museo del Prado. II. De los dibujos de Goya (1928)
- Antonio Rafael Mengs. 1728-1779. Noticia de su vida y de sus obras, exhibition catalogue (1929)
- "The new Goyas at the Prado Museum. The Fernández Durán Bequest", Parnasus (New York, 1931)
- "Les premières mesures de défense du Prado au cours de la guerre civile en Espagne", Mouseio (Paris, 1937)
- De Barnabá de Módena a Francisco de Goya. Exposición de pinturas de los siglos XIV al XIX recuperadas por España (Madrid, 1939)
- "The Prado Museum from July 18, 1936 to March 28, 1939", Spain, nos. 89-90 (June 1939)
- Museo del Prado: Goya. II. 84 dibujos inéditos y no coleccionados (1941)
- "El donativo Cambó al Museo del Prado", Arte Español (1942)
- Velázquez. Las meninas y sus personajes (1943)
- "Los aumentos del Museo del Prado en un quinquenio", Revista de las Artes y Oficios (Madrid, 1944)
- with Elías Tormo: Pintura, escultura y arquitectura en España (Madrid, 1949)
- El Museo del Prado. Cuadros, estatuas, dibujos y alhajas (Madrid, 1949)
- "El Museo del Prado: noticia histórica. Escuelas italianas. América en el Prado", Mundo Hispánico, no. 13 (1949)
- Desarrollo del Museo del Prado (Barcelona, 1950)
- Itinerario del Museo del Prado (Madrid, 1952)
- "Las adquisiciones del Museo del Prado, 1952-1953", Archivo Español de Arte (1954)
- "Las adquisiciones del Museo del Prado, 1954-1955", Archivo Español de Arte (1956)
- Guía completa del Museo del Prado (Madrid, 1958)
- "Retratos ingleses en el Museo del Prado", Goya (1958)
- "Seis fragmentos de la decoración mural de San Baudelio de Berlanga en el Prado", Celtiberia (1959)
- Trésors de la peinture au Prado (París, 1959)
- El Museo del Prado (Santander, Universidad Internacional Menéndez Pelayo, 1961)
- The Prado, "The World of Art Library" series (London, Thames and Hudson, 1961)
- "Adquisiciones del Museo del Prado 1956-1962", Archivo Español de Arte (1962)
- "El Museo del Prado. Reformas y adquisiciones. 1960-1962", Goya (1962)
- Tesoros de la pintura en el Prado (Madrid, ed. Daimond, 1962)
- Guía completa del Museo del Prado (Madrid, ed. Peninsular, 1963)
- with Alexandre Cirici-Pellicer: Treasures of Spain I: From Altamira to the Catholic Kings(Editions d'Art Albert Skira, Geneva, 1967, 249 p.)
- with Alexandre Cirici-Pellicer:Treasures of Spain II: From Charles V to Goya (Editions d'Art Albert Skira, Geneva, 1965, 236 p.)
- Goya: la Quinta del Sordo, Forma e colore 30, 1965
- Escritos sobre Velázquez (2000), posthumously collected.

== Awards ==
In 1951 he received the Civil Order of Alfonso X, the Wise (Grand Cross). He also received the Argentinian Order of May and the French Legion of Honour.

== See also ==
- Maria Kusche, a student of Sánchez Cantón
