= Isidore Taylor =

French dramatist, philanthropist, and traveler (1789–1879)

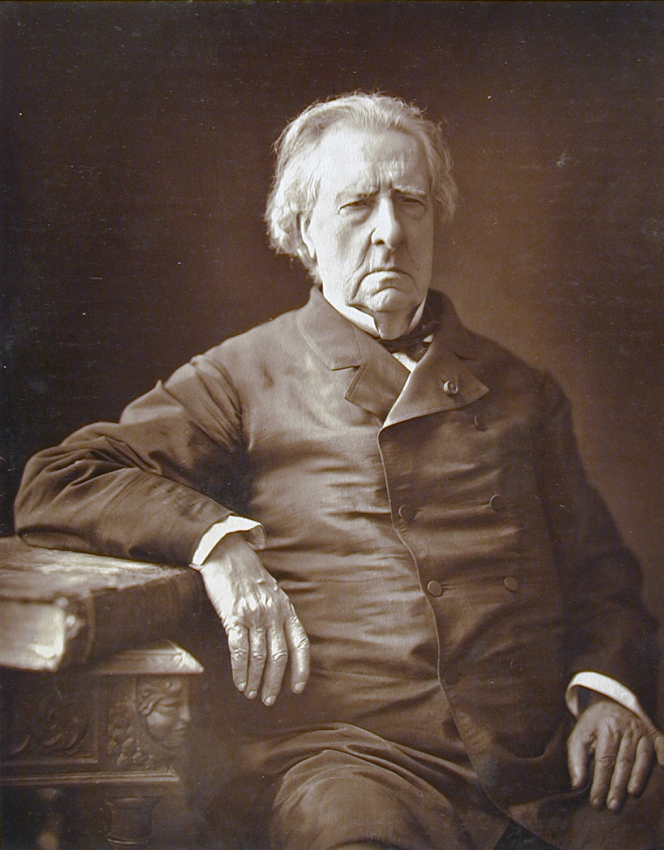
Baron Taylor (1877) by Nadar

Isidore Justin Séverin, Baron Taylor (5 August 1789 – 6 September 1879) was a French dramatist, artist, and philanthropist. He was closely associated with the development of French theatre, a pioneer of Romanticism, and also a noted traveller.

== Life and career ==
Isidore Taylor was born in Brussels on 5 August 1789; his father Hélie Taylor was English born and took French nationality, and his mother was the Belgian Marie-Jacqueline Walwein (from what was then the Austrian Netherlands). Originally destined for a military career, the young man neglected this in favour of travelling about Europe and later the Near East.

Among the fruits of his travels was a series of books on the French regions, Voyages pittoresques et romantiques dans l'ancienne France (1820–63), the nearly 7000 lithographs in which were the first to catalogue the French artistic patrimony. Another book, La Syrie, l'Égypte, la Palestine et la Judée (Paris, 1839), was illustrated with the author's watercolours, two of which are now in the collection of the Victoria and Albert Museum. Ennobled in 1825 by King Charles X, he was by this time collecting Spanish art on behalf of the new French King Louis Philippe I, who made him a Commissioner of Art in 1838. These paintings constituted the then named Spanish gallery of the Louvre.

George Borrow describes meeting Taylor before and during the 1830s in his book The Bible in Spain.

"He has visited most portions of the earth, and it is remarkable enough that we are continually encountering each other in strange places and under singular circumstances. Whenever he descries me, whether in the street or the desert, the brilliant hall or amongst Bedouin haimas, at Novgorod or Stambul, he flings up his arms and exclaims, 'O ciel! I have again the felicity of seeing my cherished and most respectable B…'".

Early on the Baron was also active in the theatrical world. Between 1825 and 1838 he served as Royal Commissioner of the Theatre Francaise. He used this position to encourage the production of Romantic drama. Among those he helped was Alexandre Dumas, who dedicated to Taylor his first successful play, Henri III et sa cour (The court of Henry III, 1829). Taylor himself authored plays with a Levantine background, Ismael et Maryam, ou l'arabe et la chrétienne (The Arab and the Christian, 1821) and La fille de l'Hébreu et le chevalier du temple (The Jewess and the Templar, 1823) and co-authored with Charles Nodier an adaptation of Charles Maturin's successful drama, Bertram ou le pirate (1821).

After age 50 in the 1840s he focussed on philanthropic activity, setting up several mutual societies for members of the artistic professions. They continue to this day as the Taylor Foundation. In recognition of his work he was elected to the Académie Française in 1847, named a senator of the Second Empire in 1869 and made an officer of the Legion of Honour in 1877.

== Artistic representations ==
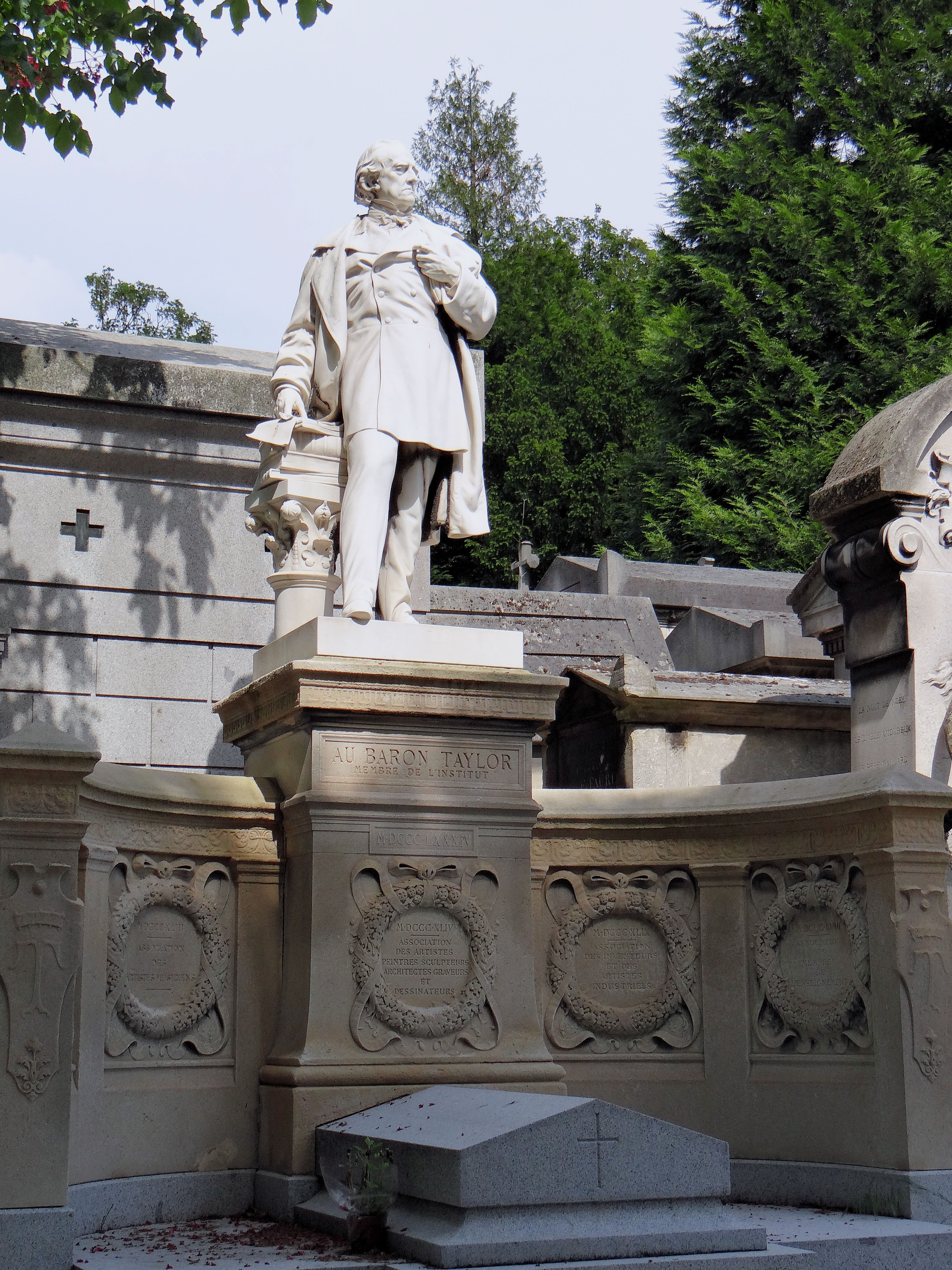
Statue of Baron Taylor in Père Lachaise Cemetery

After his death, Taylor was buried in the Père Lachaise Cemetery with a memorial statue by sculptor Gabriel-Jules Thomas. A decorative bust by Tony Noel (1845-1909) was also erected on behalf of the Taylor Foundation on the Boulevard Saint Martin. Both of these show the baron in old age. There were attractive earlier portraits of him by Jean Alaux when he was 22, and by Federico de Madrazo y Kuntz at the age of 44. The latter is a three-quarters bust that pictures him in his official uniform in 1838. He also figures in the crowded canvas of Édouard Manet's Music in the Tuileries (1862). Taylor is pictured in the mid-foreground to the left with his cane beneath his arm as he talks to Charles Baudelaire and Theophile Gautier.
