= Portrait of Infanta Isabella Clara Eugenia (Anguissola) =

Painting by Sofonisba Anguissola

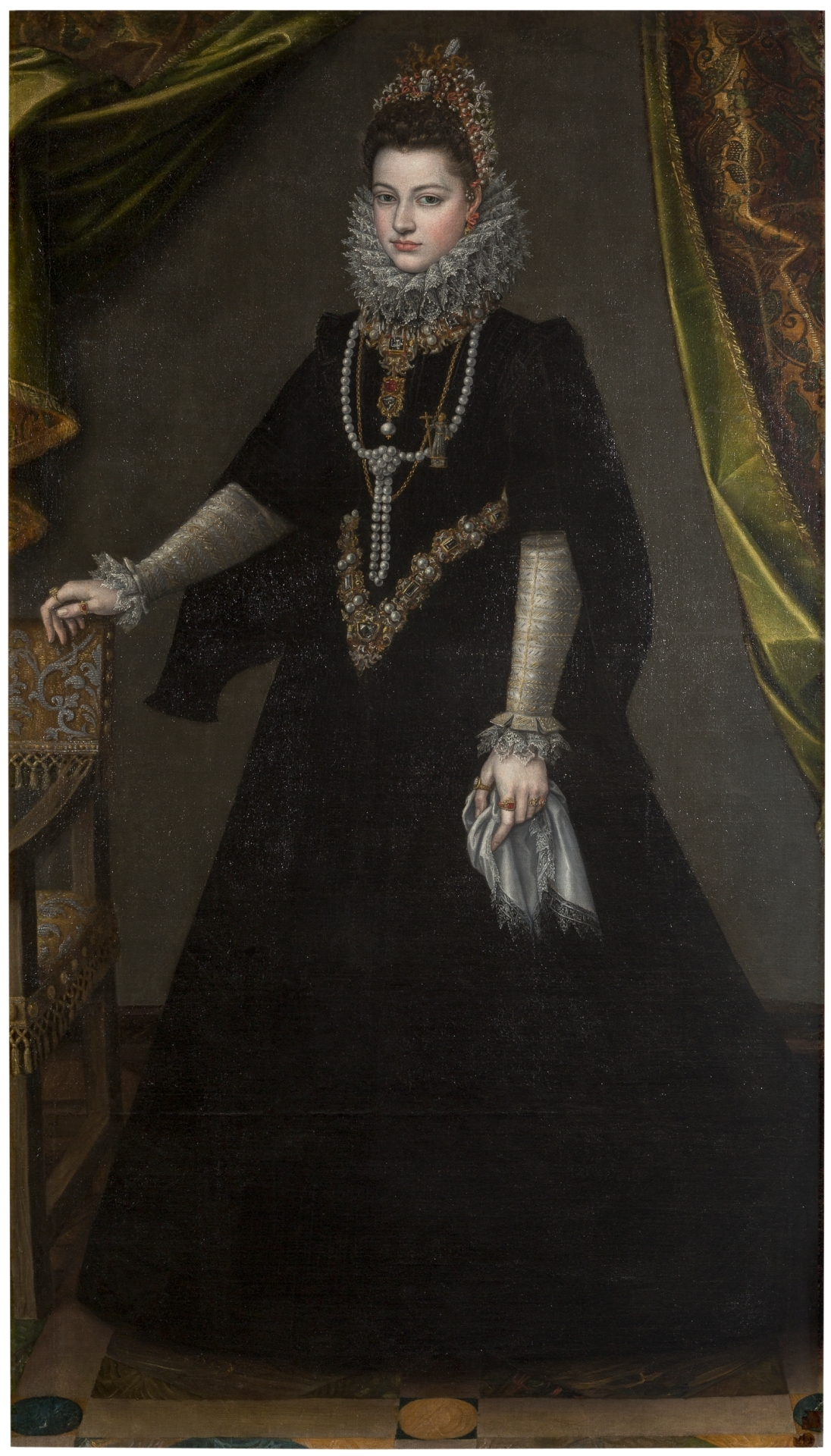
Portrait of Infanta Isabella Clara Eugenia (1599) by Sofonisba Anguissola

Portrait of Infanta Isabella Clara Eugenia is a 1599 oil-on-canvas painting of Isabella Clara Eugenia by the Italian painter Sofonisba Anguissola, identified in 1992 by Maria Kusche. Owned by the Museo del Prado, it currently hangs in the Spanish Embassy in Paris.

== Production ==
In 1609 Pedro Paolo De Ribera referred to Anguissola producing a portrait of infanta Isabella during her stop in Genoa en route to Brussels in June 1599 He states that infanta "daily spent long hours chatting [with the artist], remembering things which had had happened to her in her tender years". Anguissola was a portraitist for the Spanish court and also produced a portrait of Isabella's mother Elisabeth of Valois.

Isabella is shown wearing a sumptuous court dress, a large pleated ruff, a pearl necklace, a gold chain with a figure of Francis of Assisi or Anthony of Padua and a girdle studded with pearls, rubies and diamonds, resting her right hand on the back of a chair and her left hand holding a lace-edged handkerchief. Profoundly religious, she spent her last years in the "Descalzas Reales" monastery and in the habit of a nun, as shown in her later portrait by Rubens.

Isabella only stopped in Genoa a few days, not long enough to complete the portrait, and so Isabella requested that she would "sent it to her en route [once it was complete], as she did". However, in the end, it seems the work was not sent directly to Isabella in Vienna or Brussels but to Madrid as a gift from Isabella to her step-brother, the future Philip III of Spain. The work is mentioned in an inventory of works at the Royal Alcázar of Madrid compiled after Philip II's death, though without an attribution.

== Later history ==
The work was probably one of the works confiscated in 1835 from Infante Sebastian of Portugal and Spain for supporting the Carlist cause. In 1865 the work appeared as number 212 in Catalogo del Museo de la Trinidad de Cruzada Villaamil with an attribution to the Spanish painter Alonso Sánchez Coello. That catalogue also featured a portrait of a man of identical dimensions attributed to Coello. In 1861 the Portrait of Infanta Isabella and the other paintings were restored to Sebastian. In 1868 it passed to its current owner and was first hung at the Embassy in 1882.

== See also ==
- List of paintings by Sofonisba Anguissola
