= Juan Pantoja de la Cruz =

Spanish artist (1553–1608)

Juan Pantoja de La Cruz
- Born: Juan Pantoja de La Cruz; 1553; Valladolid
- Died: 26 October 1608 (aged 54–55); Madrid, Spain
- Known for: Court painter

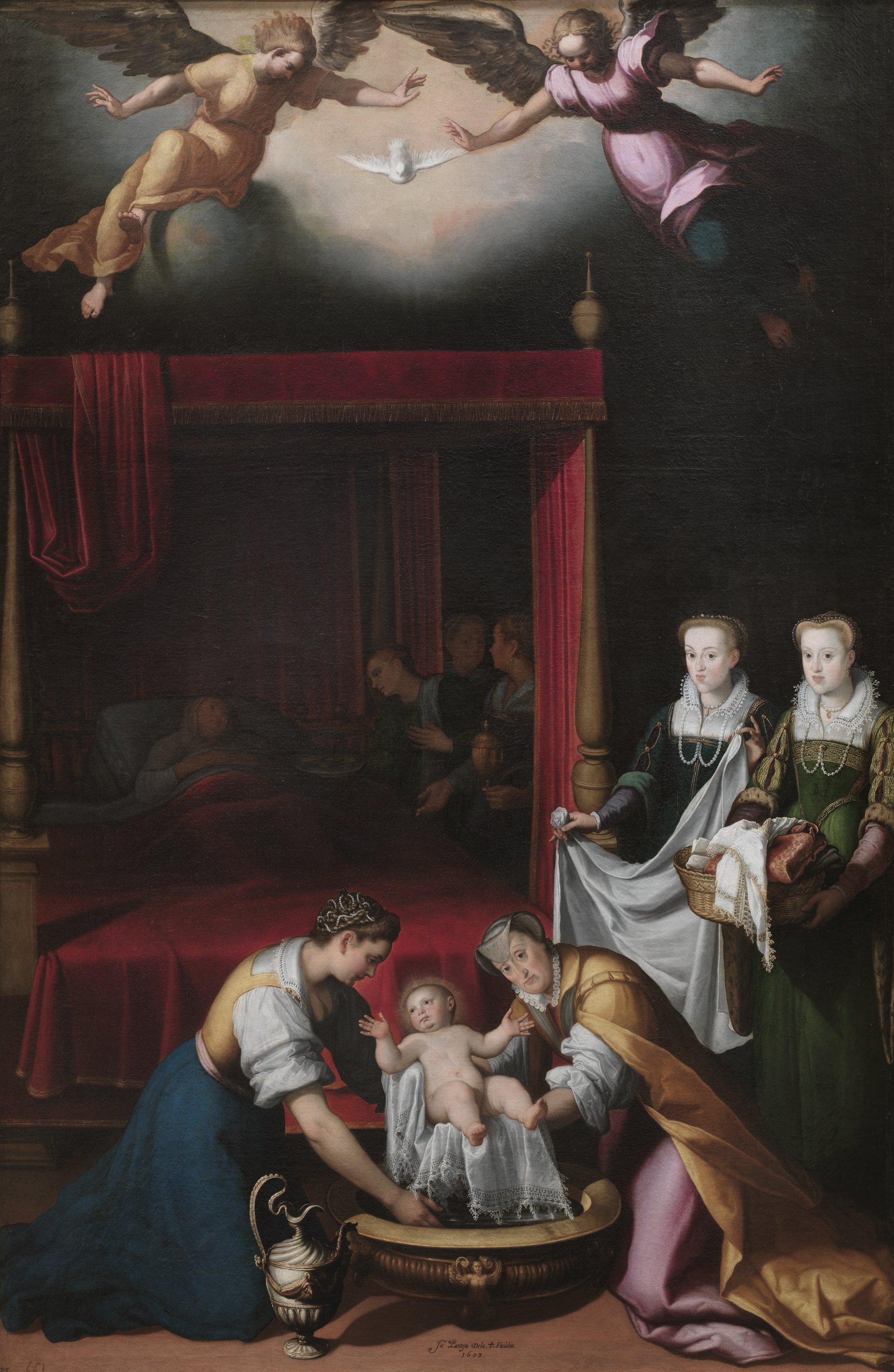
El nacimiento de la Virgen, por Juan Pantoja de la Cruz

Juan Pantoja de La Cruz (1553 – 26 October 1608) was a Spanish painter, one of the best representatives of the Spanish school of court painters. He worked for Philip II and Philip III. The Museo del Prado contains examples of his severe portraiture style.

== Life ==
Juan Pantoja de La Cruz was born in 1553 in Valladolid. Very little is known of his formative years as a painter. He was a pupil of the court painter Alonso Sánchez Coello in Madrid and he must have assisted his master in complying with his duties as painter of the Spanish King, Philip II. Pantoja probably continued to work in his master studio after completing his training. He married in 1585 beginning to paint for the court around that time. After Sanchez Coello's death in 1588, Pantoja took over his master workshop and became court painter to Philip II of Spain.

Pantoja kept working for the court and the nobility, painting portraits of Prince Philip, the future Philip III, in 1592 and 1594. Among his most well known works is the portrait of Philip II wearing a cape and hat all in black, painted around 1594 for the Escorial. This portrait is one of the best representations of the idea of Spanish majesty, based on the remoteness of the monarch. On Philip II's death in 1598, Philip III confirmed Pantoja's status as court painter. When the court settled in Valladolid in 1601, Pantoja moved to the new capital, remaining in this city, several years.

Juan Pantoja de la Cruz painted a great number of state portraits with the combined forces of his studio, his attendants, apprentices, and collaborators. He was primarily a portrait painter to the royal family, (whom he accompanied on journeys to Valladolid, Burgos, Lerma and the Escorial), and to the higher aristocracy. Pantoja also painted religious works primarily commissioned by the Spanish Queen, Margaret of Austria, wife of Philip III. Pantoja's paintings of religious themes also contain many portraits as auxiliary figures as in The Birth of the Blessed Virgin (1603) in which he included the mother of the Queen. He painted still lifes as well, but, like his ceiling frescoes, these have not survived. Pantoja returned with the court to Madrid and he died there on 26 October 1608.

== Style ==
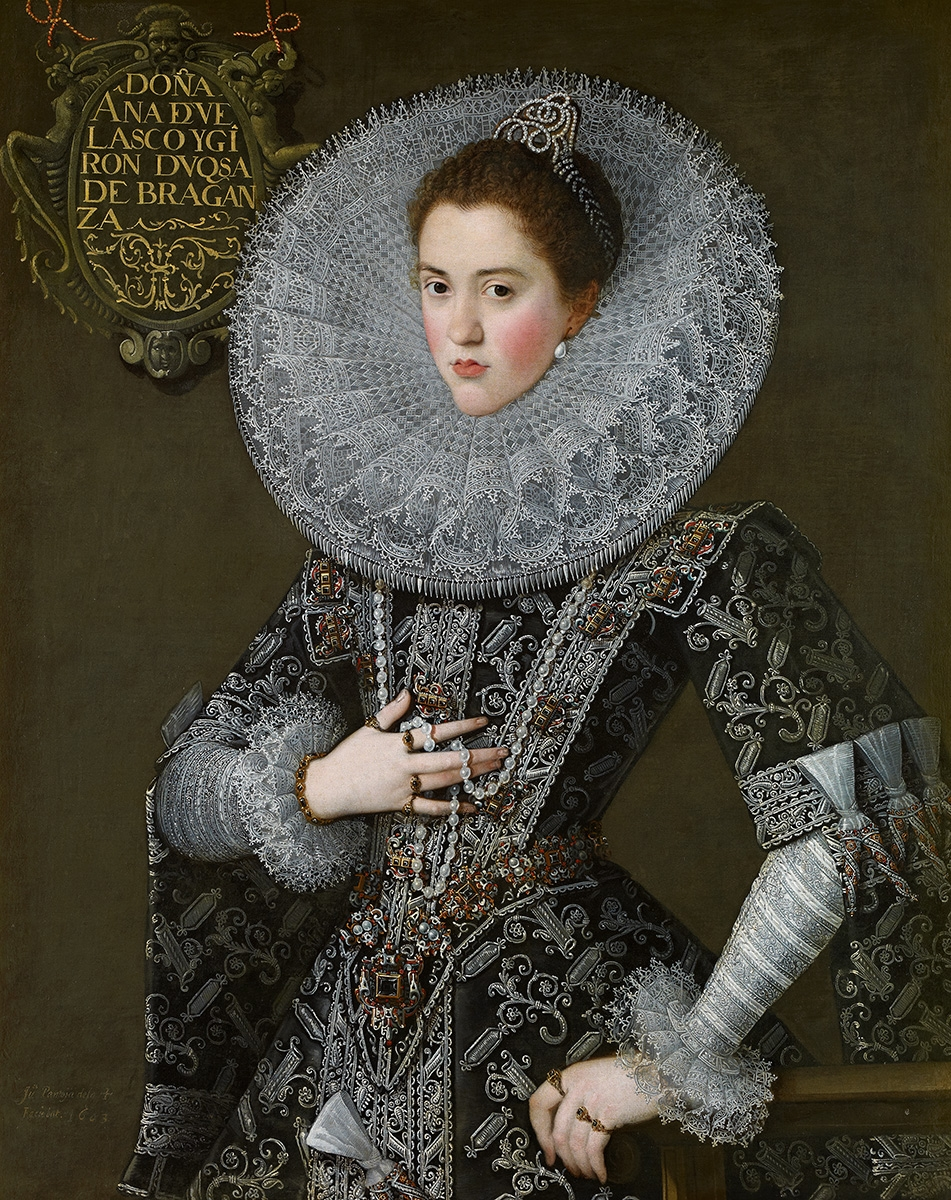
Ana de Velasco y Girón, Duchess of Braganza, at 18 in 1603 (Spain, Koplowitz collection).

Pantoja followed the Spanish tradition of court painter of royal portraits, going back to the famous portrait of Charles V (Pantoja's copy of which is in the Escorial) and other portraits by Titian. Antonis Mor, Alonso Sanchez Coello and Pantoja himself continued the tradition. His art was severely criticised by historians who were prejudiced against non-Italian portraiture and therefore dismissed him as an "uninspired, dull" though "painfully hard-working" painter at the court of Philip III. The compositional formula of Velázquez's state portraits derives from his Spanish predecessors, among them Pantoja de la Cruz.

The quality of individual portraits is variable; they were often produced in many versions with varying degrees of help from his assistants. In his best works, Pantoja introduced an impressive combination of sophistication and geometric abstraction achieved by means of powerful contrast of light and shadow. His portraits are noted for the meticulous detail of representing the intricate embroidery of dresses and jewelry designs. The subject is usually portrayed standing against a dark background. The face and hands are depicted with a more flat and subtle technique. Among his portraits are: Philip III, Queen Margarita of Austria, 1606, Prado, Madrid). Infanta Isabel Clara Eugenia (1599), Alte Pinakothek, Munich. (Duchess of Braganza, 1603, col.; Unknown lady, col. Marquess of Viana; D. Diego de Valmayor, 1605, Hermitage, St Petersburg.

Juan Pantoja de la Cruz was held in high esteem as an animal painter; was also known as a landscape and still life painter who exploited the new secularized art forms that spread across Europe at the close of the sixteenth century. Acclaimed as a gifted artist by contemporary writers, Lope de Vega and Francisco de Quevedo have left eloquent evidence of their admiration for Pantoja. In La hermosura de Angelica (1602), an imitation of Ariosto's Orlando Furioso, Lope de Vega couched his praise in the following couplet: "Juan de la Cruz que si criar no pudo / Dio casi vida y alma a un rostro mudo;" and Quevedo extolled Pantoja's work as a miniaturist in the poem "El Pincel", written in 1615, seven years after Pantoja's death.

== See also ==
- Cultural depictions of Philip II of Spain
- Maria Kusche

== Bibliography ==
- Kusche, Maria, juan Pantoja de la Cruz, Madrid, 1964
