= Elías Tormo =

Spanish art historian (1869–1957)

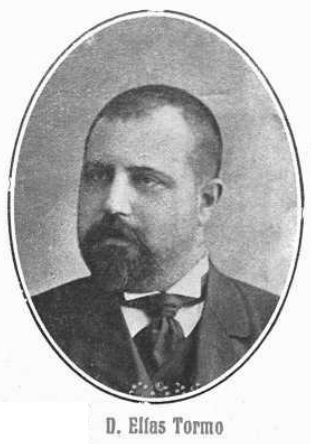
- Tormo in December 1910
- Born: Elías Tormo y Monzó; June 23, 1869; Albaida (Valencia), Spain
- Died: December 21, 1957 (aged 88); Madrid, Spain

Academic work
- Discipline: Art Historian
- Sub-discipline: Medieval and Renaissance Spanish art
- Institutions: University of Santiago de Compostela, Universidad Central, Madrid
- Notable ideas: Hispano-Flemish style

Elías Tormo y Monzó (1869–1957) was a Spanish art historian.

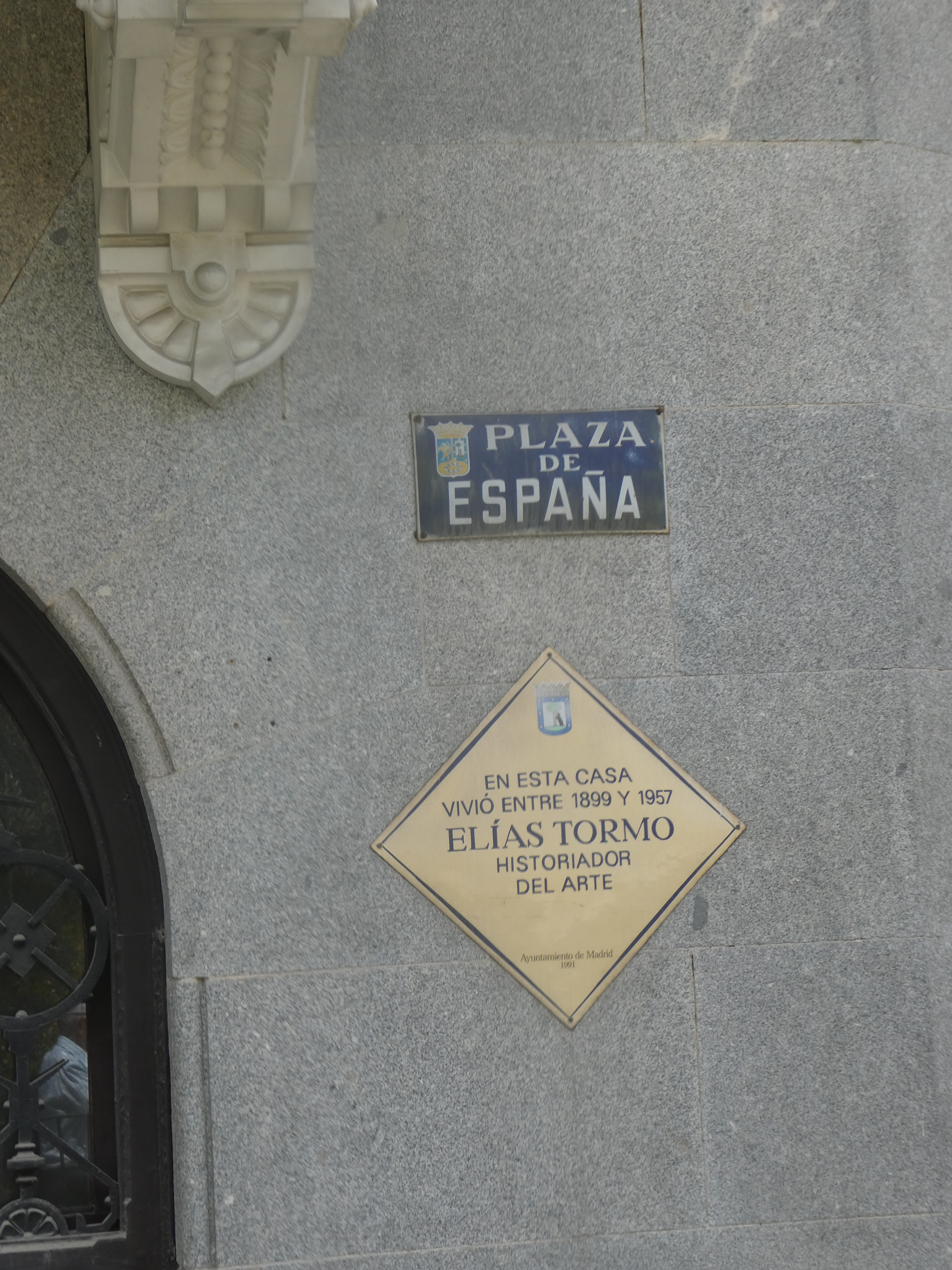
Plaque on Tormo's house on the Plaza de España, Madrid.

== Life ==
Tormo was born in Albaida (Valencia), on 23 June 1869. He studied Law in Valencia and Arts in Madrid, becoming a professor at the University of Santiago de Compostela. In 1903 he moved to Universidad Central (now Complutense University of Madrid) to take up the first professorship in Art History ever to be established in Spain. He eventually became rector of the university.

Together with Manuel Gómez-Moreno Martínez he founded the journal Archivo Español de Arte y Arqueología.

He was a member of the Real Academia de la Historia and of the Real Academia de Bellas Artes de San Fernando. He also served in public office as a parliamentarian (1903-5, 1907-23, 1927-30, 1949-52), and as Minister of Public Instruction and Fine Arts (1930-31).

In 1924 Alfonso XIII did away with the distinction between state and personal arms by combining the two. Elías Tormo was the author of the reform, he took the arms of Charles III, substituted the Aragon quarter with Jerusalem, and replaced the escutcheon with the state arms.

He died in Madrid on 21 December 1957.

== Works ==
- Jacomart y el arte hispano-flamenco cuatrocentista (Madrid, 1913)
- Las Viejas series icónicas de los reyes de España (Madrid, 1916)
- with Francisco Javier Sánchez Cantón, Los Tapices de la Casa del Rey (Madrid, 1919)
- Levante (Madrid, 1923)
- Monumentos de Españoles en Roma, y de Portugueses e Hispano-Americanos (Madrid, 1942)
- Las Murallas y las torres, los portales y el Alcazar del Madrid de la Reconquista, creación del Califato (Madrid, 1945)
- with Francisco Javier Sánchez Cantón, Pintura, escultura y arquitectura en España (Madrid, 1949)
