= Spanish gallery =

Gallery of Spanish paintings in the Louvre from 1838 to 1853

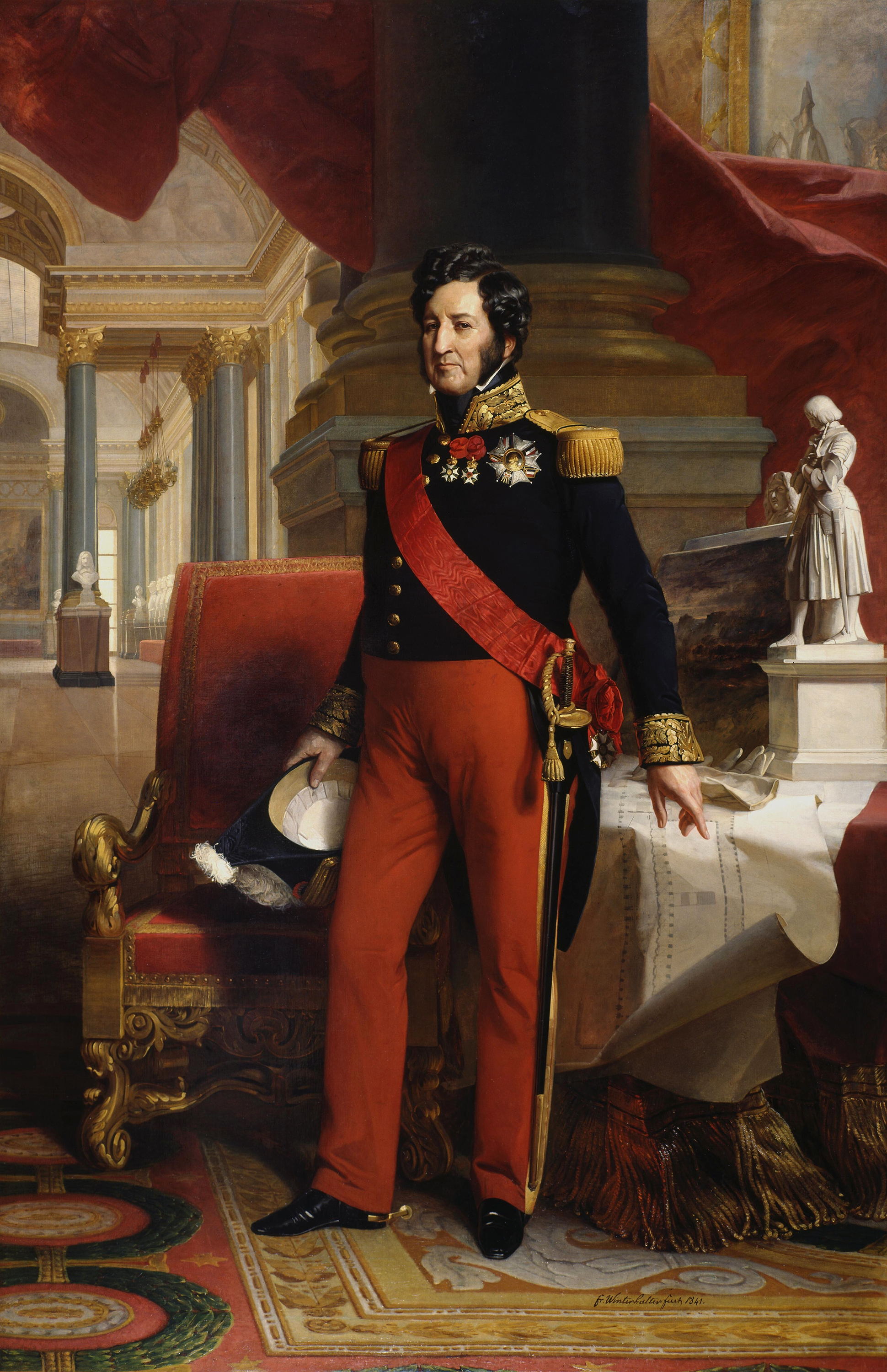
Portrait of Louis Philippe I by Franz Xaver Winterhalter, 1841

The Spanish gallery, also called Spanish museum was a gallery of Spanish painting created by French King Louis Philippe I in 1838, shown in the Louvre, then dismantled in 1853.

== Historical context ==
Until the French Revolution, Spanish art was seldom shown or known in France. It appeared at the Louvre with the Napoleonic Wars and the looting policies of Vivant Denon. However, stolen art pieces were given back by France after the Congress of Vienna (1814–1815).

Louis Philippe decided in 1835 to found a Spanish painting gallery in the Louvre. He had several motivations:

- He wanted to rebuild contacts with the Spanish branch of the Bourbon dynasty (the relationship with the Spanish branch had been degraded by the Napoleonic Wars), and therefore put himself in the context of the European royal families to legitimize his new power,
- He also wanted to use the Spanish paintings as a model to renovate French painting, away from the current Neoclassicism of the times.

== Creation of the Gallery ==
Beginning in 1810, French occupation and repression in Spain made it highly unstable. The secularization of religious orders facilitated the selling of their art pieces outside of the Spanish territory.

In 1835, he founded an "artistic mission" directed by Baron Isidore Taylor, which was in charge of constituting quickly a vast collection of Spanish paintings. Taylor acquired a huge collection of hundreds of paintings from primitive paintings to the Spanish Golden Age. Many of the paintings he acquired were unknown from the public because they came from religious collections.

The Spanish Gallery opened to the public on 1838/01/07, in five rooms on the first floor of the Louvre Cour Carrée's East (Colonnade) Wing. The opening was accompanied by a lot of royal marketing and publicity. Louis Philippe stressed the point that the collection was acquired on his own founds. The collection counted for example 81 Zurbarán, 39 Murillo, 28 Ribera, 23 Cano, and 19 Velázquez. Many paintings attracted the admiration of the public.

However, the collection, which counted 450 paintings, was criticized for its inconsistency. Taylor sent "en masse" the paintings, without any preliminary selection, and nobody in the Louvre had the required expertise to operate this selection. Masters as Murillo and Zurbarán were shown alongside much smaller artists.

== Dispersion and influence ==
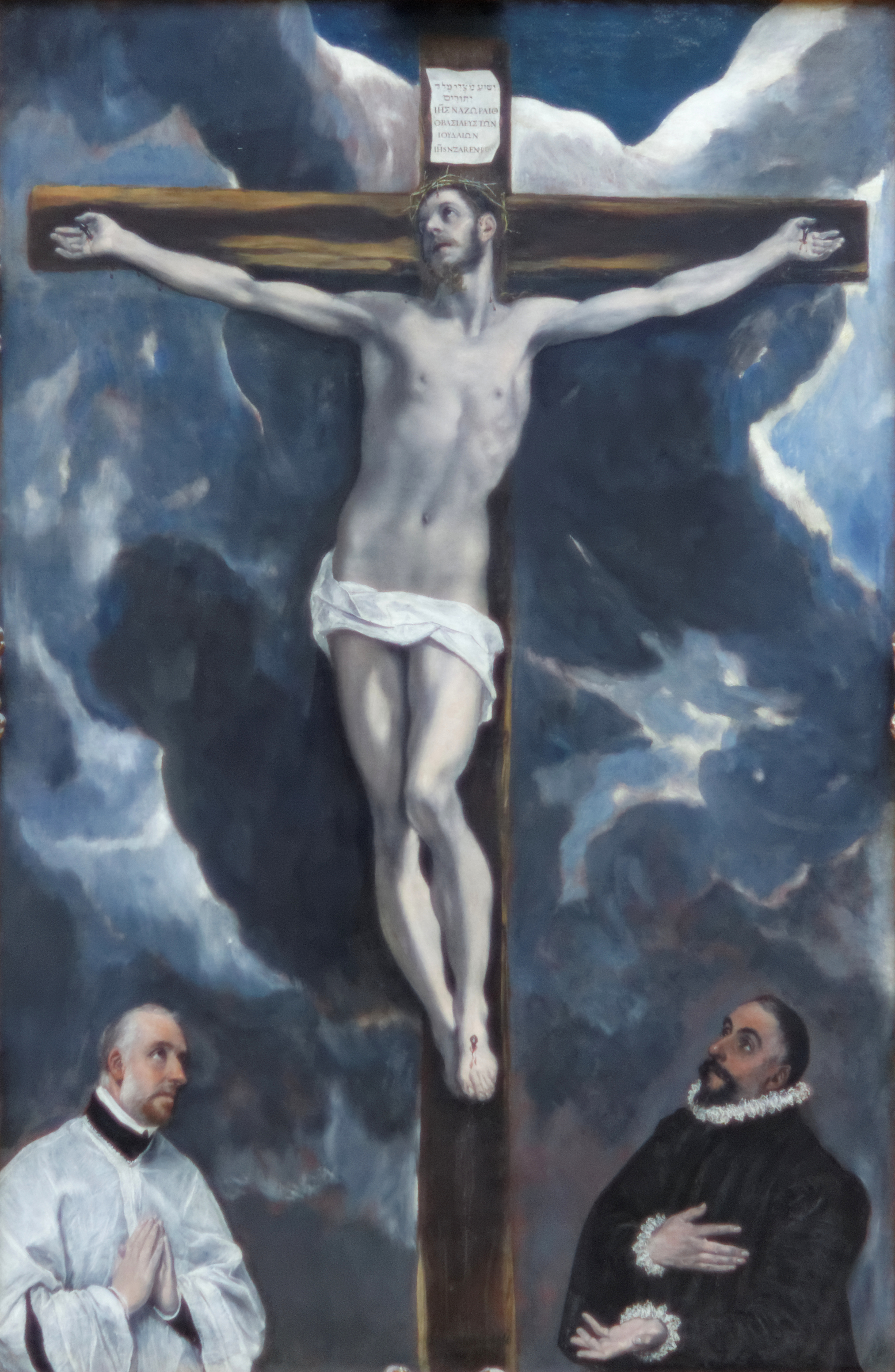
Le Christ en croix adoré par deux donateurs, from El Greco.

After the exile and death of Louis Philippe, the collection was dismantled in London, from 6 to 8 May 1853, during an auction in Christie's. Only one painting was forgotten in the reserves and remained in the Louvre (The deploration of Christ by Jaume Huguet). One of the paintings returned later to the Louvre in 1908: "Le Christ en croix adoré par deux donateurs" from El Greco, bought from the Prades town for 25000 francs. Nowadays only these two paintings from the initial collection are shown in the Louvre.

This collection was seen by many artists and intellectuals of the time and influenced them. Édouard Manet wrote to Charles Baudelaire, concerning Velázquez, in a letter from the 14 September 1865: "he is the greatest painter of all times.

== Bibliography ==
- Bruno Foucart (April–May 2015). "L'éphémère musée espagnol du roi des Français". Grande Galerie – Le Journal du Louvre. Louvre.
- Notice des tableaux de la Galerie Espagnole exposés dans les salles du Musée Royal au Louvre, Imprimerie de Crapelet, Paris, 1838; p. 117 archive
- Collective, Manet – Velasquez : la Manière espagnole au XIXième, Réunion des Musées Nationaux, 2002 ISBN 2711844900
