= Alonso Sánchez Coello =

Spanish painter (1531/1532–1588)

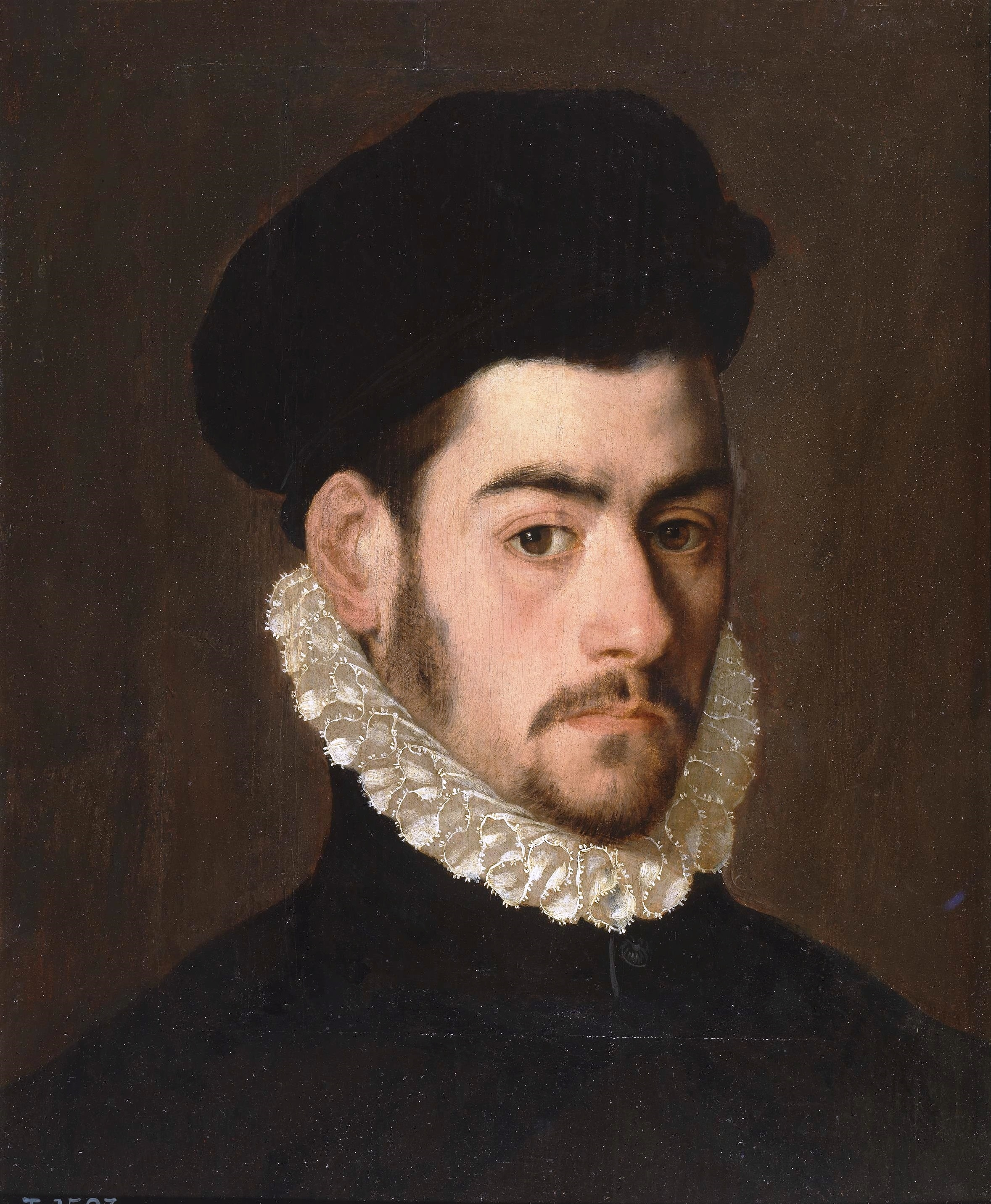
- Possible self-portrait, c. 1570. Museo del Prado, Madrid
- Born: c. 1531/1532; Benifairó de les Valls, Valencia
- Died: 8 August 1588 (aged 55–56); Madrid, Spain
- Known for: Painting
- Movement: Portuguese Renaissance; Spanish Renaissance
- Spouse: Stephanie Hermann

Alonso Sánchez Coello (c. 1531 – 8 August 1588) was an Iberian portrait painter of the Spanish and Portuguese Renaissance. He is mainly known for his portrait paintings executed in a style which combines the objectivity of the Flemish tradition with the sensuality of Venetian painting. He was court painter to Philip II.

== Life ==
Alonso Sánchez Coello was born in Benifairó de les Valls, near Valencia in Spain. He spent his childhood there until the death of his father when he was around ten years old. He left for Portugal c. 1541 or 1542 to live with his grandfather, who was then in the service of the Portuguese monarchs and had been raised to the Portuguese nobility. Coello's years in Portugal and his family name of Portuguese origin led to a long-standing belief that he was in fact Portuguese. His grandfather's master King John III of Portugal sent the young painter to study with Anthonis Mor (also known as Antonio Moro) in Flanders around 1550. He came under the protection of Antoine de Granville, bishop of Arras, who was also a patron of Mor.

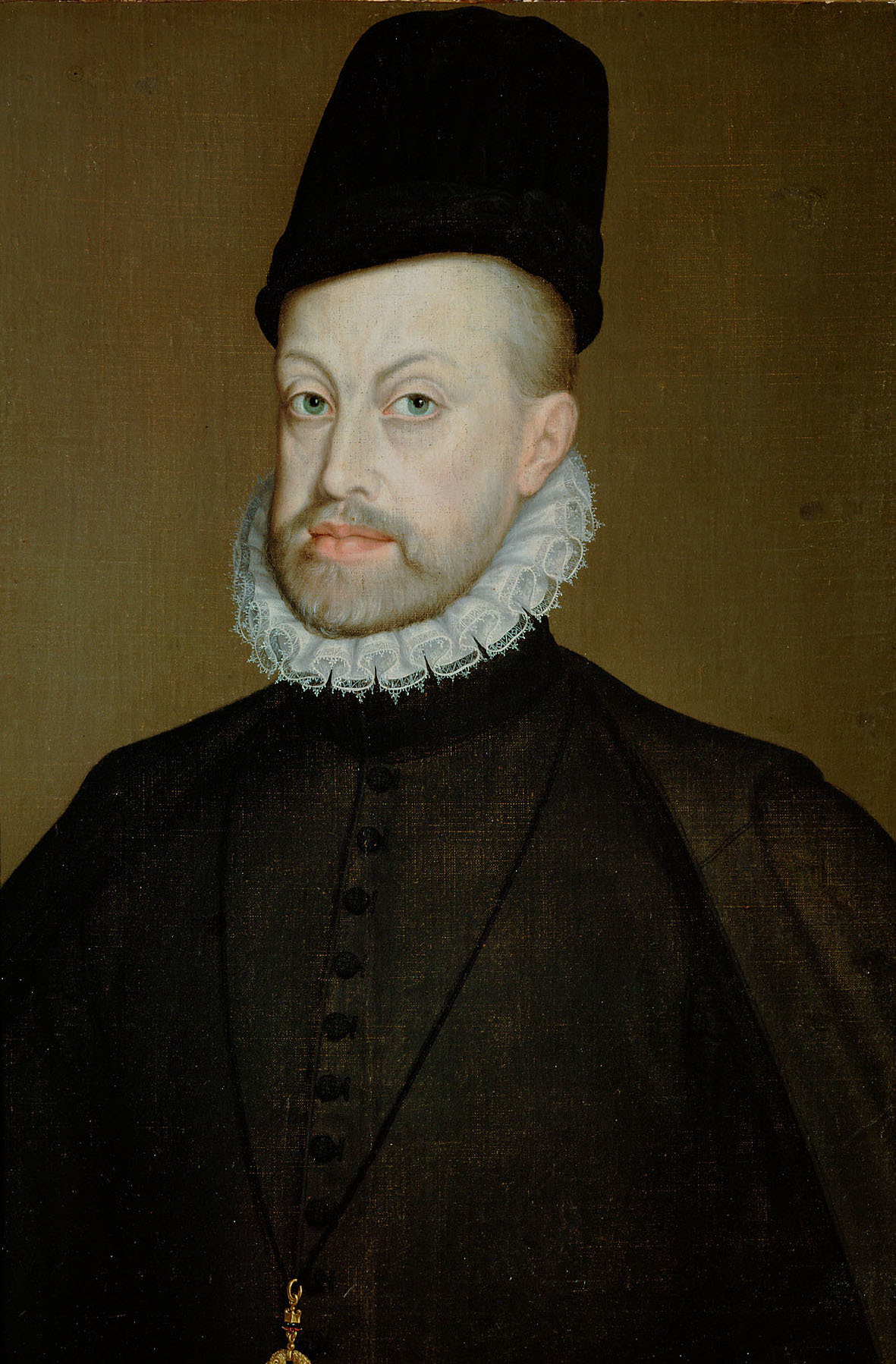
Portrait of King Philip II of Spain, c. 1568. Kunsthistorisches Museum, Vienna

In 1552, the painter went to Lisbon with Anthonis Mor when Charles V commissioned Mor to paint the Portuguese royal family. For a few years, Sánchez Coello remained in Portugal working for the court of the heir to the throne, João Manuel, Prince of Portugal. After the prince's death, he moved to the Spanish court of Philip II, having been recommended by the widow of John, Juana, who was the sister of the Spanish king. In 1555, he was in Valladolid working for the Spanish court.

Sánchez Coello became Court Painter in 1560. He married Louisa Reyaltes, a daughter of a silversmith, in either 1560 or 1561 in Valladolid. The couple had seven children. Coello's daughter, Isabel Sánchez (1564–1612), became a painter. She studied and helped in her father's workshop. The painter moved with the court to Toledo and finally settled in Madrid in 1561. Coello worked on religious themes for most of the palaces, particularly for El Escorial, and larger churches. Philip II held him in high esteem and was godfather to two of his daughters. The painter spent the remainder of his life at the court, becoming a personal favourite of the king and acquiring honours and wealth.

Among his disciples were Juan Pantoja de la Cruz and Felipe de Liaño. Lope de Vega praised Coello in his work Laurel to Apolo. Alonso Sánchez Coello died in Madrid on 8 August 1588.

== Works ==
While Coello produced both portraits and religious paintings, it is for his portraits that he is chiefly remembered. They are marked by an ease of pose and execution, a dignity and sobriety of representation, and warmth of colouring. Although influenced by the paintings of both Mor and Titian, these portraits display an original talent and reflect admirably the modesty and formality of the Spanish court. Paintings of Philip II (c. 1580) and Infanta Isabel Clara Eugenia (1571), both in the Prado, Madrid, are two of his finest works. Sánchez Coello also produced a touching series of paintings of the children of Philip II. The extreme delicacy of the children's portrait softens the rigid etiquette and fashion of the court. The double portrait of the Infantas Isabella Clara Eugenia and Catalina Micaela (1568–9; Madrid, Convent of Las Descalzas Reales) is an example.

Coello was a follower of Titian, and, like him, excelled in portraits and single figures, elaborating the textures of his armours, draperies, and such accessories in a manner that had a notable influence on Velázquez's style regarding those objects. From Mor, Coello learned precision in representation, and from Titian he incorporated Venetian gold tones, generous workmanship, and the use of light on a canvas. While his debt to Mor is evident, Coello brought distinctive qualities to the court portrait, notably a sharp sense of colour, a crispness of execution and a heightened realism. Coello's reputation as a portraitist has been diluted by the innumerable copies and imitations that wrongly bear his name. In the absence of a biographical study of Coello, many of his works are still confused with those of Sofonisba Anguissola, who painted royal portraits in the same period, and Juan Pantoja de la Cruz, Coello's pupil.

The religious works, many of which were created for El Escorial, are considered good but undistinguished examples of the more conventional austere style. Among his religious paintings is the St. Sebastian in the church of San Geronimo, also in Madrid. Also attributed to the artist is a topographical view of the busy port of Sevilla (Museum of the Americas, Madrid).

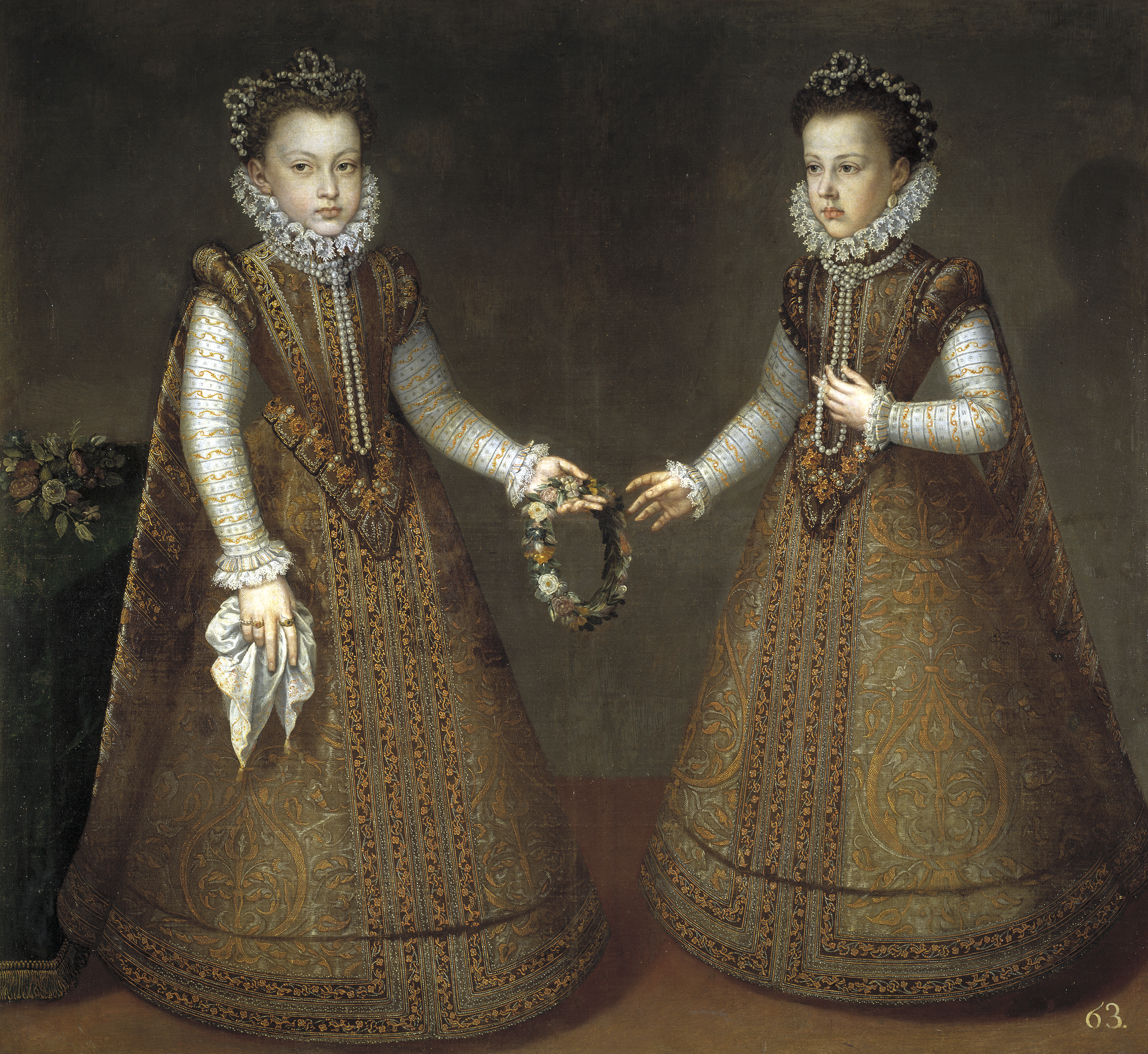
Infantas Isabella Clara Eugenia and Catalina Micaela, c. 1575. Museo del Prado, Madrid

== Gallery ==
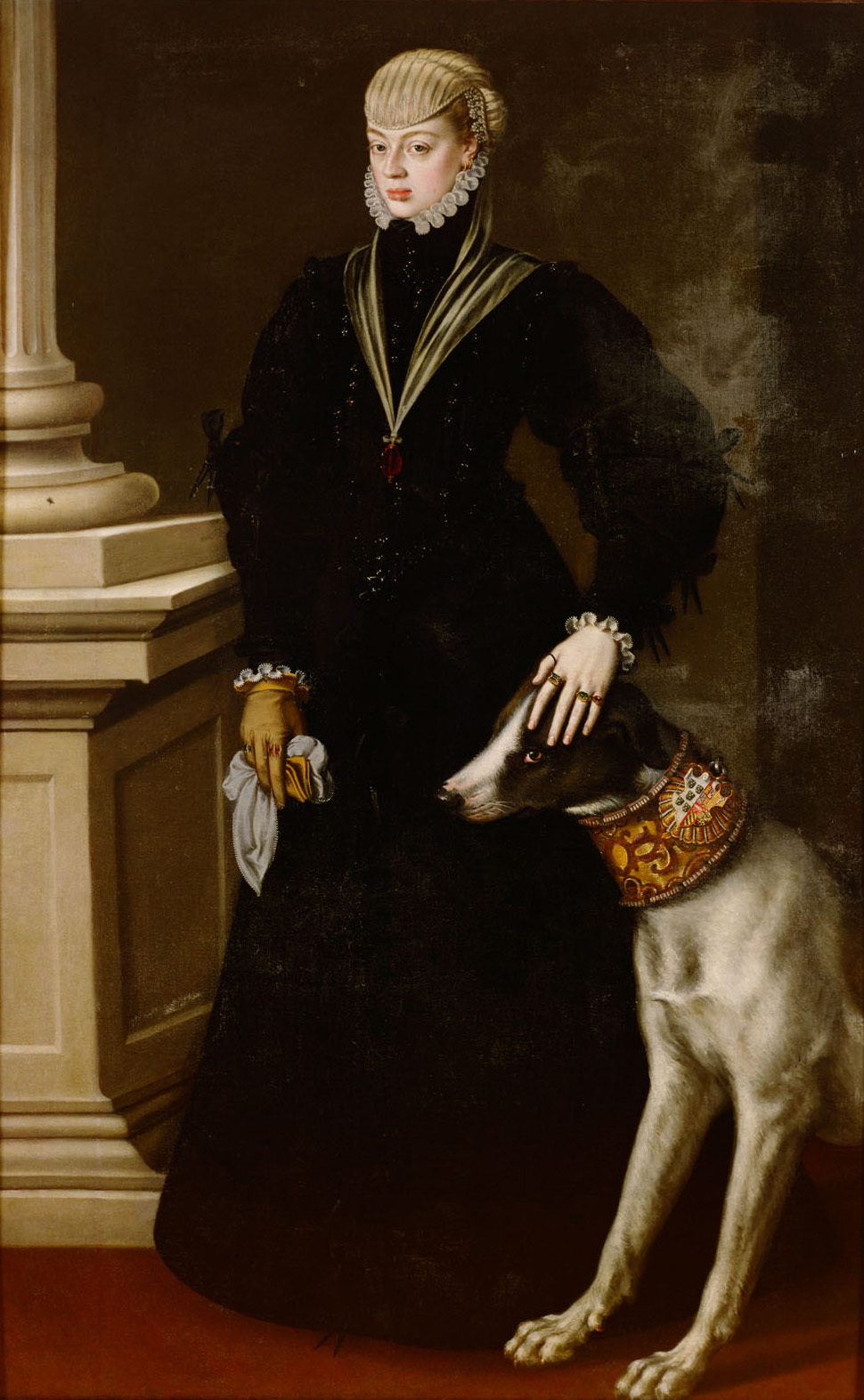
Joanna of Portugal, 1557. Kunsthistorisches Museum, Vienna

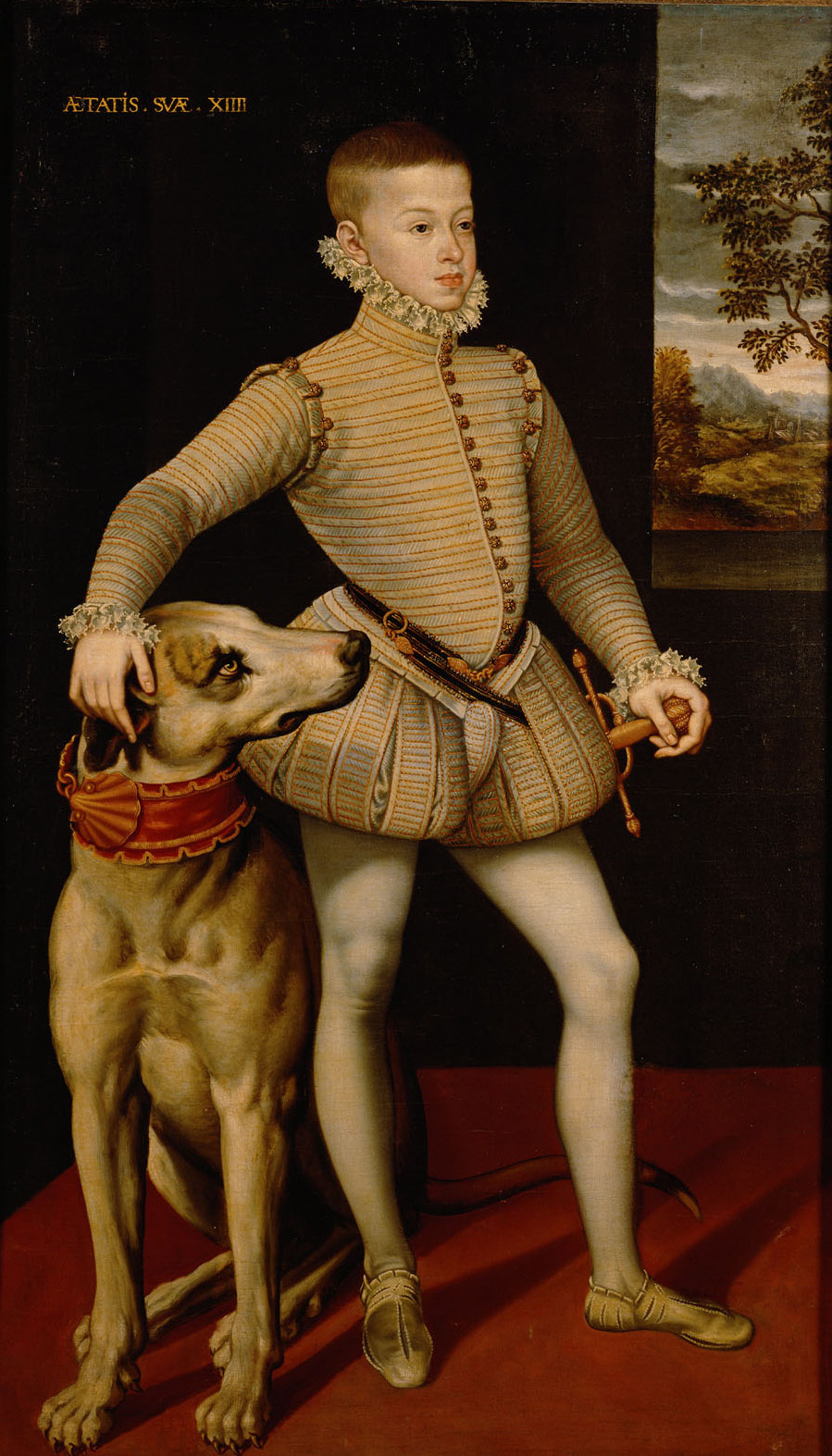
Albert VII, Archduke of Austria, c. 1573. Ambras Castle, Innsbruck

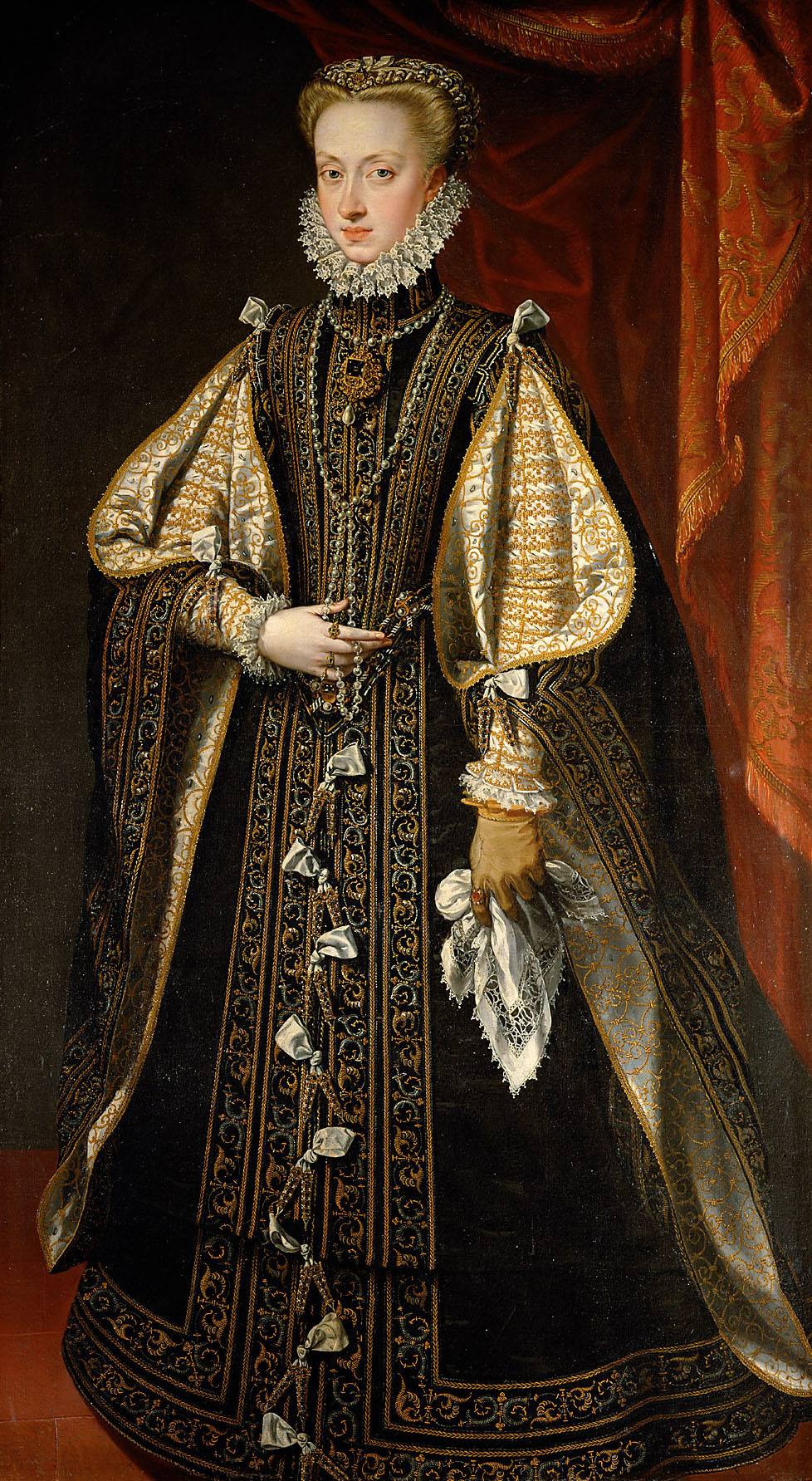
Anna of Austria, 1571. Kunsthistorisches Museum, Vienna

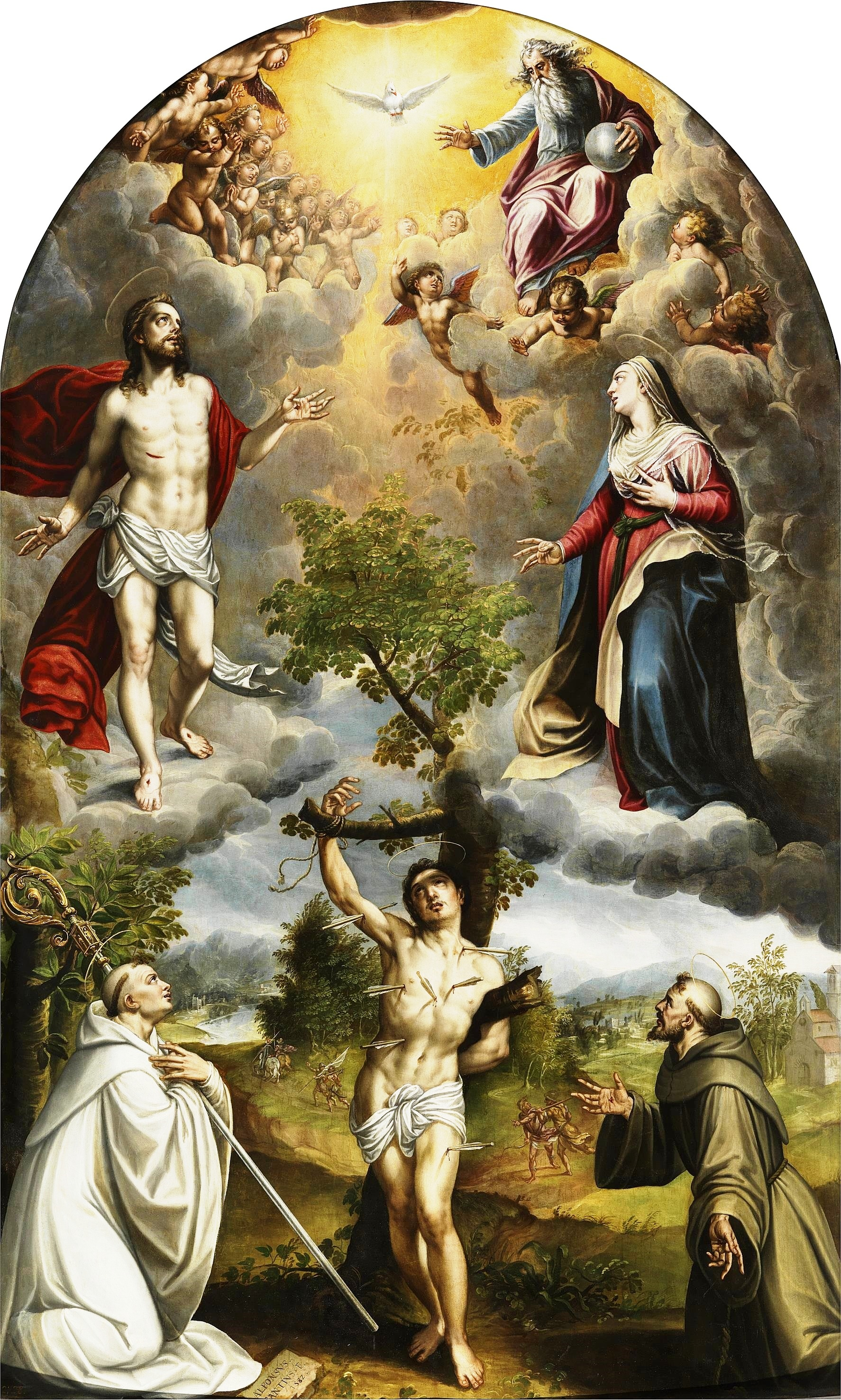
St Sebastian between St Bernard and St Francis, 1582. Museo del Prado, Madrid

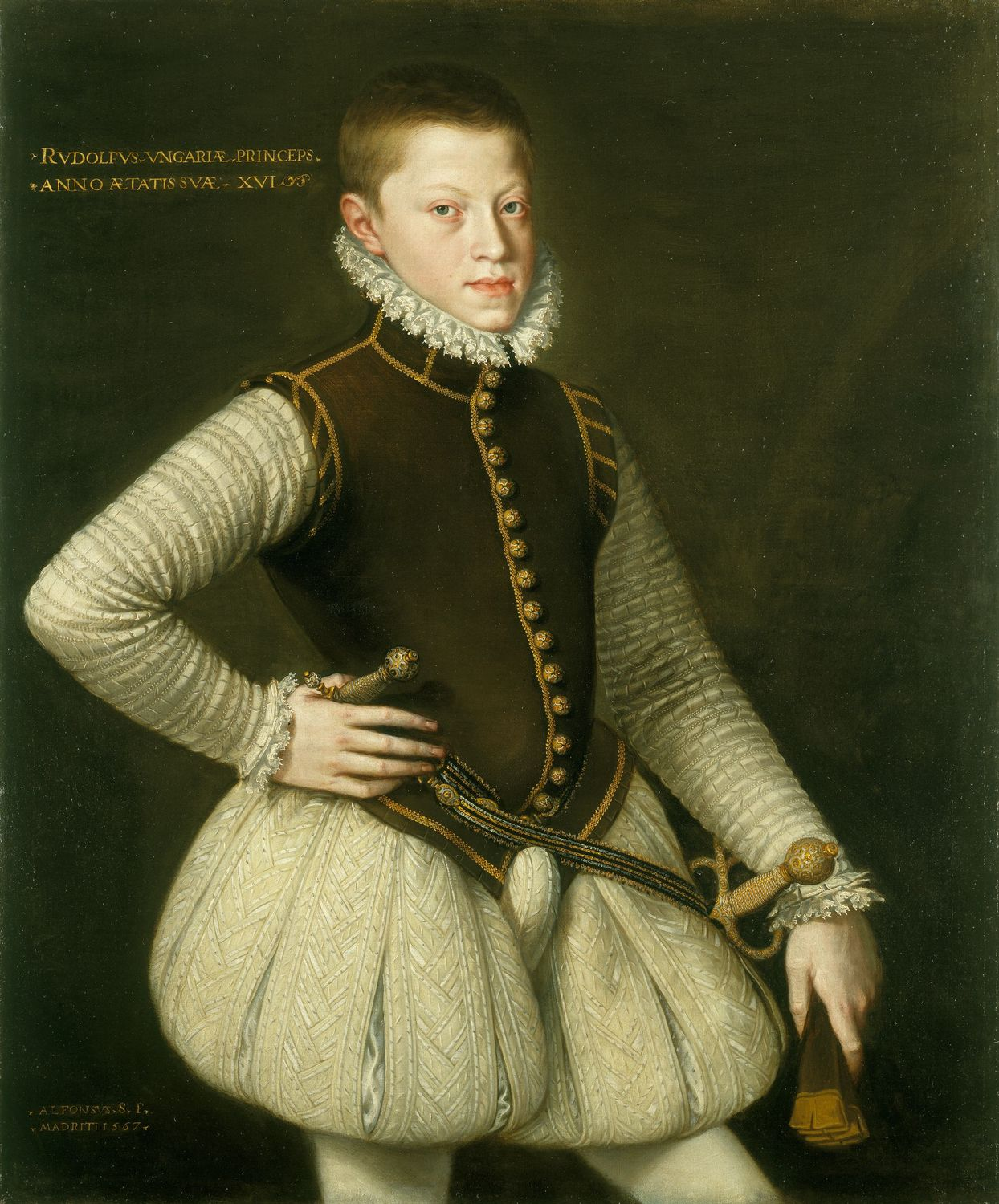
Rudolf II, Holy Roman Emperor as a young Archduke, 1567, Royal Collection

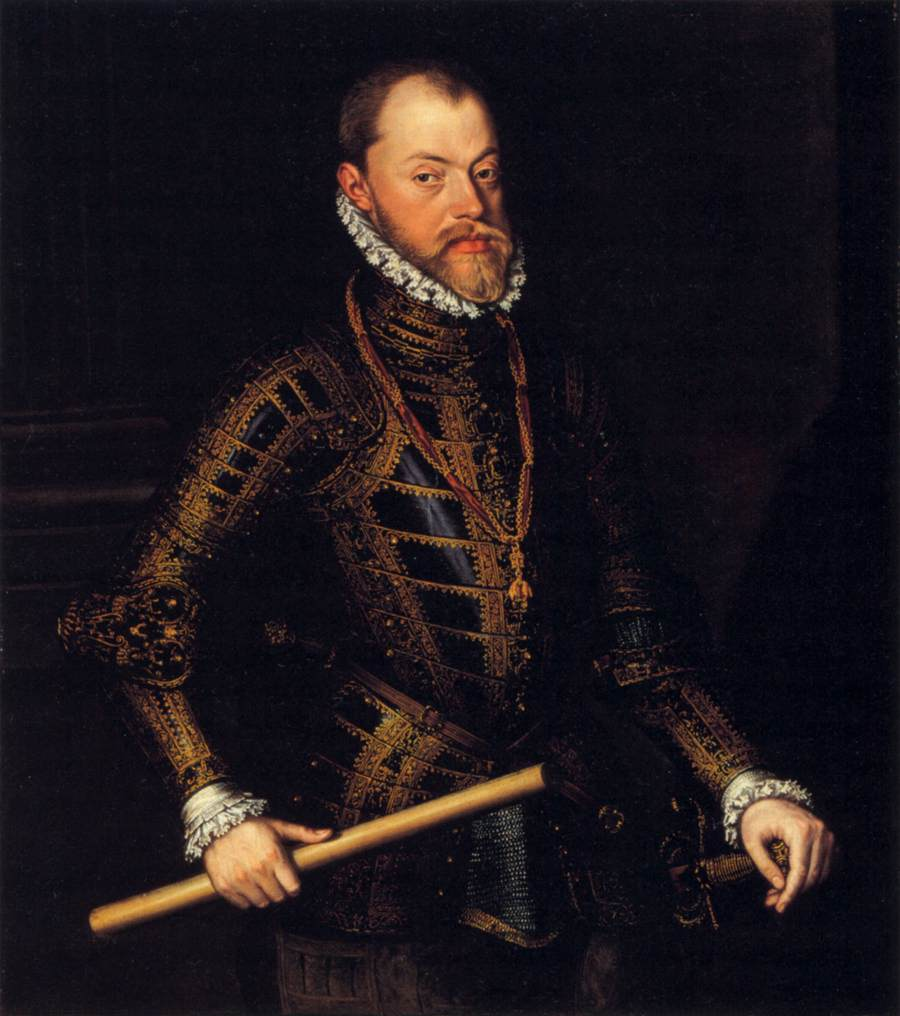
Philip II of Spain, 1570s, Pollok House, Glasgow

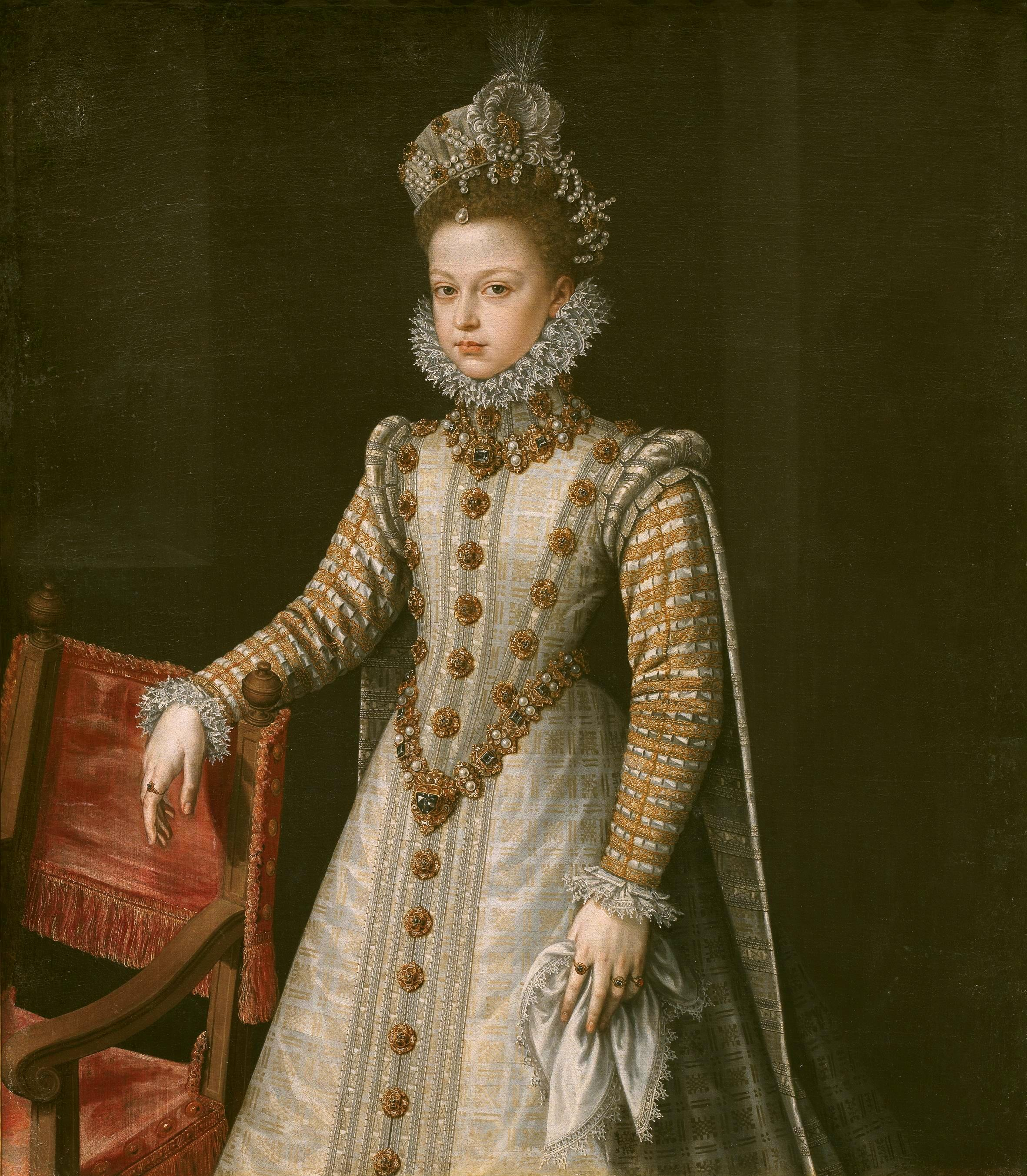
Infanta Isabel Clara Eugenia of Spain, 1579. Museo del Prado, Madrid

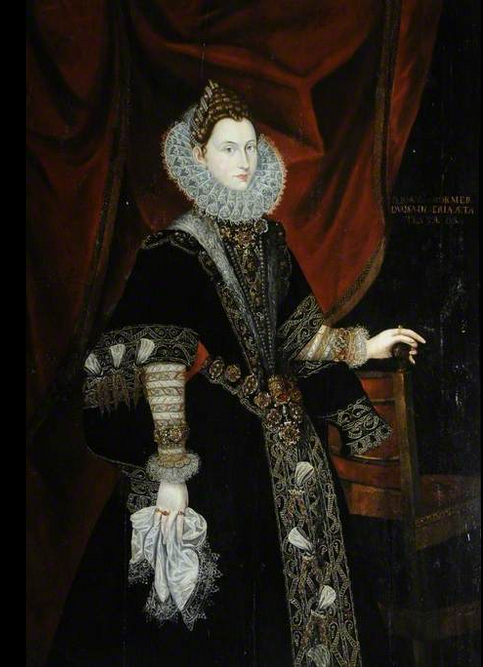
Portrait of the Duchess of Feria (nee Jane Dormer, 1538-1612) from Burton Constable Hall collection. Burton Constable Hall, Burton Constable, East Riding of Yorkshire, England, 1563

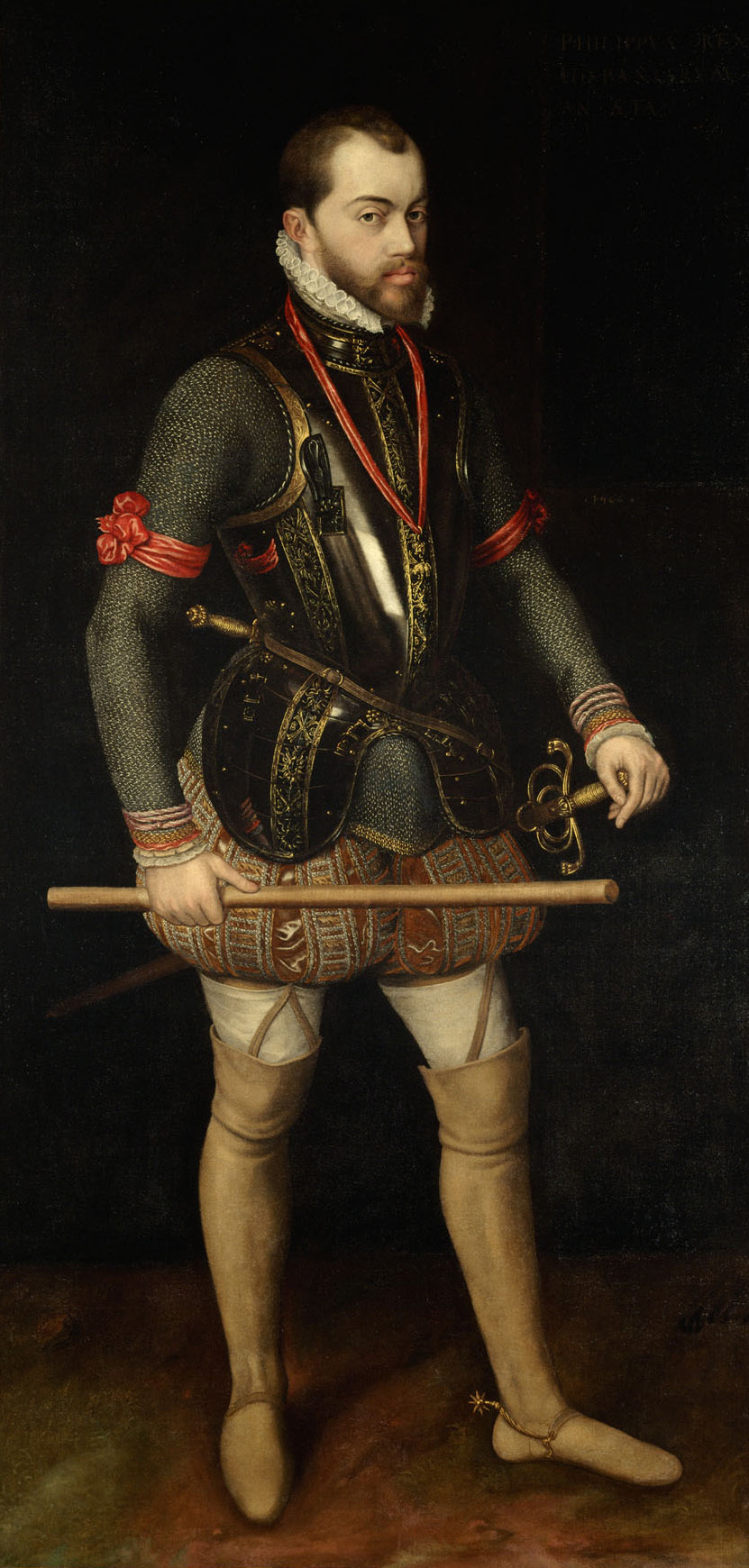
Philip II of Spain, 1566. Kunsthistorisches Museum, Vienna

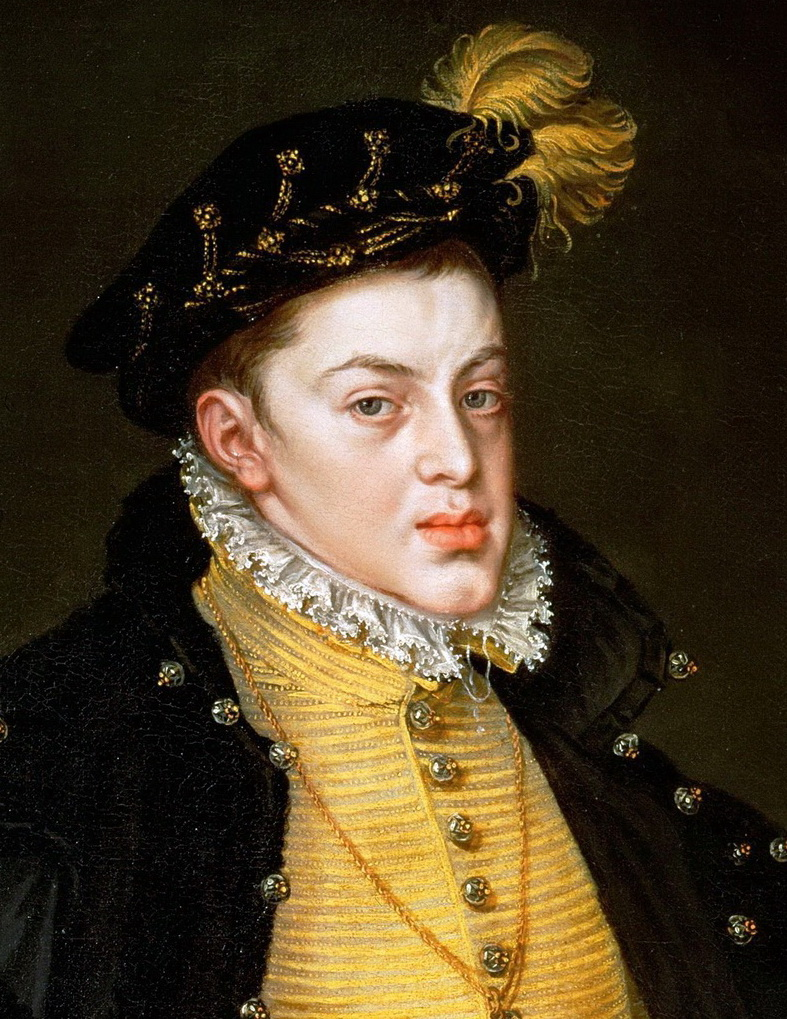
Carlos, Prince of Asturias, 1564. Kunsthistorisches Museum, Vienna

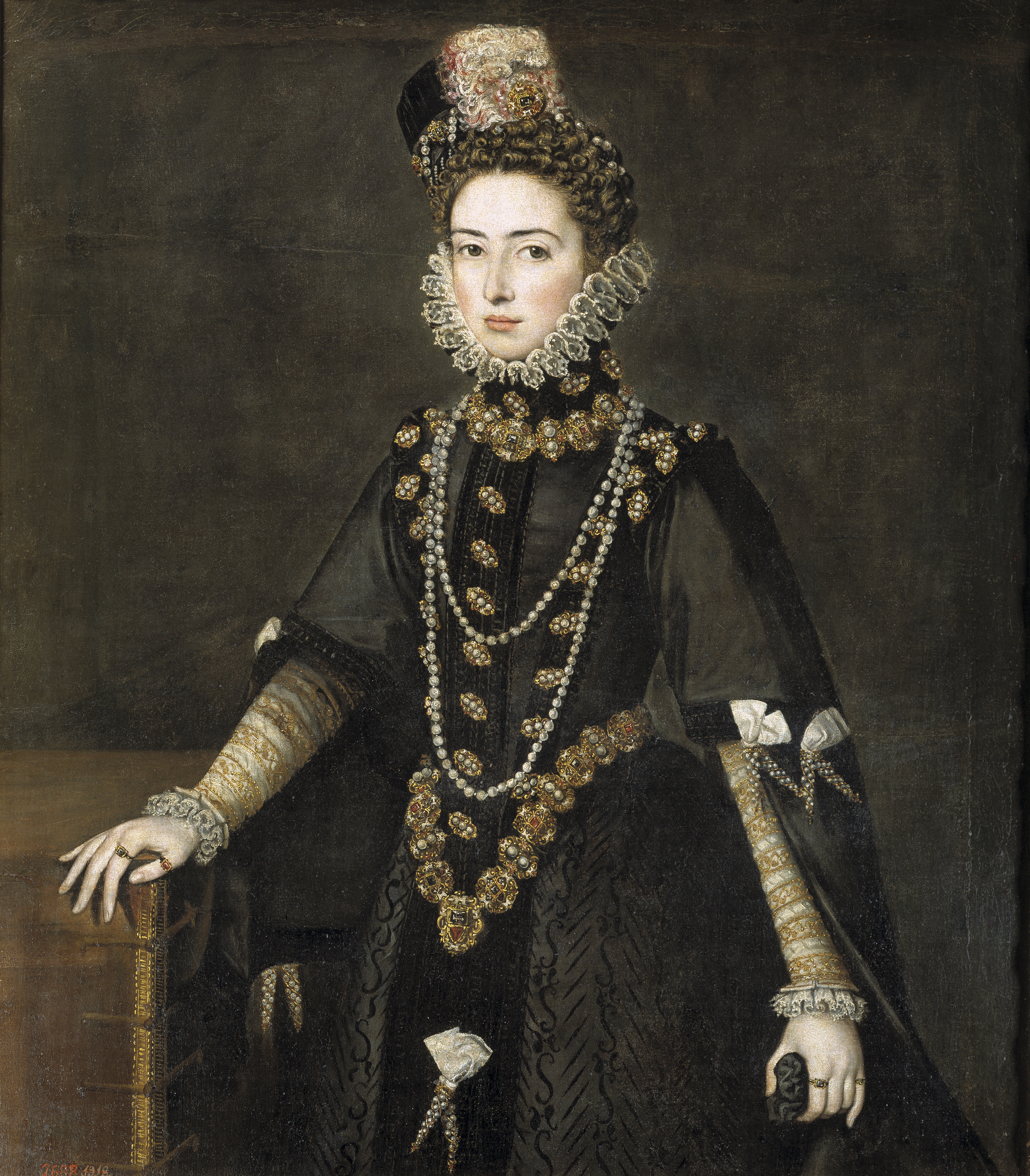
Catalina Micaela of Spain, 1584. Museo del Prado, Madrid
