= Italian Rococo art =

Italian Rococo art refers to painting and the plastic arts in Italy during the Rococo period, which went from about the early/mid-18th to the late 18th century.

== History and background ==
Italian Rococo was mainly inspired by the rocaille or French Rococo, since France was the founding nation of that particular style. Italian Rococo styles were very similar to those developed in France. The style in Italy was usually lighter and more feminine than Italian Baroque art, and became the more popular art form of the settecento.

The leading artistic centres during the Rococo in Italy were Venice, Genoa and Rome. Most Italian Rococo artists came from Venice, such as Canaletto, Tiepolo, Guardi, Piazzetta and Bellotto, but also from Rome and Genoa, such as Piranesi and Pannini. Artists such as Castiglione and Alessandro Magnasco brought the vogue of Rococo art to Genoa, and Neapolitan Rococo was mainly based on landscapes and naturalistic themes. Canaletto and Tiepolo were among the most prominent painters of the age, and they painted many frescoes and cityscapes (particularly Canaletto).

== List of painters ==
A list of Italian Rococo painters:, Sirio Antonio Africa, Jacopo Amigoni, Marcello Bacciarelli, Antonio Balestra, Francesco Bambocci, Pompeo Batoni, Antonio Bellucci, Bernardo Bellotto, Giovanni Antonio Canal, (or il Canaletto), Carlo Innocenzo Carloni, Rosalba Carriera, Andrea Casali, Placido Costanzi, Giovanni Antonio Cucchi, Carlo Angelo dal Verme, Antonio De Giorgi, Stefano Fabbrini, Federico Ferrari, Francesco Fontebasso, Francesco Liani, Pier Leone Ghezzi, Corrado Giaquinto, Ignazio Hughford, Andrea Locatelli, Pietro Longhi, Giovanni Battista Lusieri, Alessandro Magnasco, Mauro Soderini, Giuseppe Moriani, Francesco de Mura, Domenico Pellegrini, Giovanni Antonio Pellegrini, Giovanni Battista Piazzetta, Antonio Pillori, Giovanni Battista Pittoni, Giovanni Paolo Panini, Ferdinando Porta, Michele Rocca, Pietro Antonio Rotari, Giovanni Scajario, Giovanni Battista Tiepolo, Giovanni Domenico Tiepolo, Stefano Torelli, Francesco Zuccarelli, Francesco Zugno.

== Gallery ==
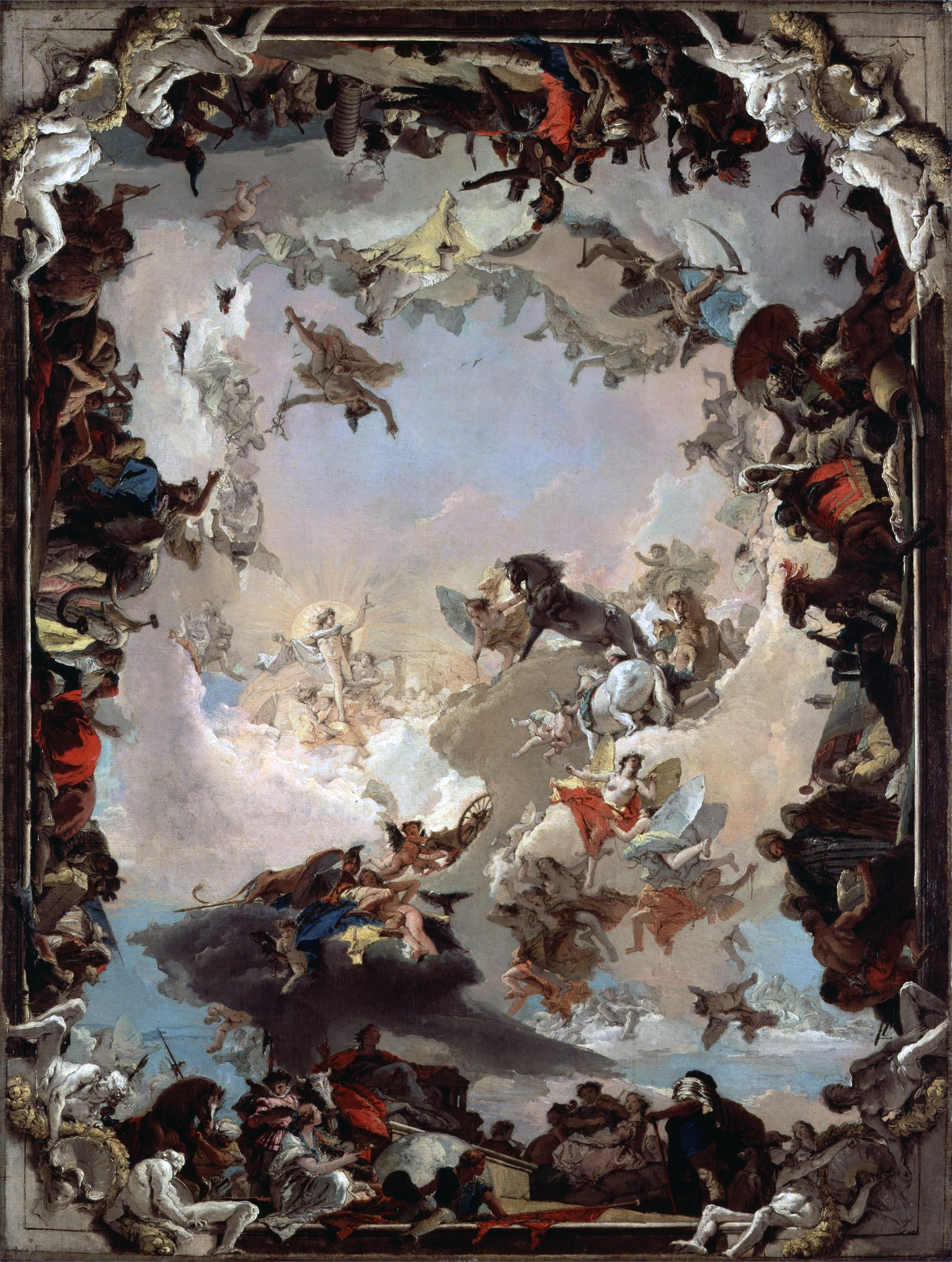
Giovanni Battista Tiepolo's Allegory of the Planets and Continents

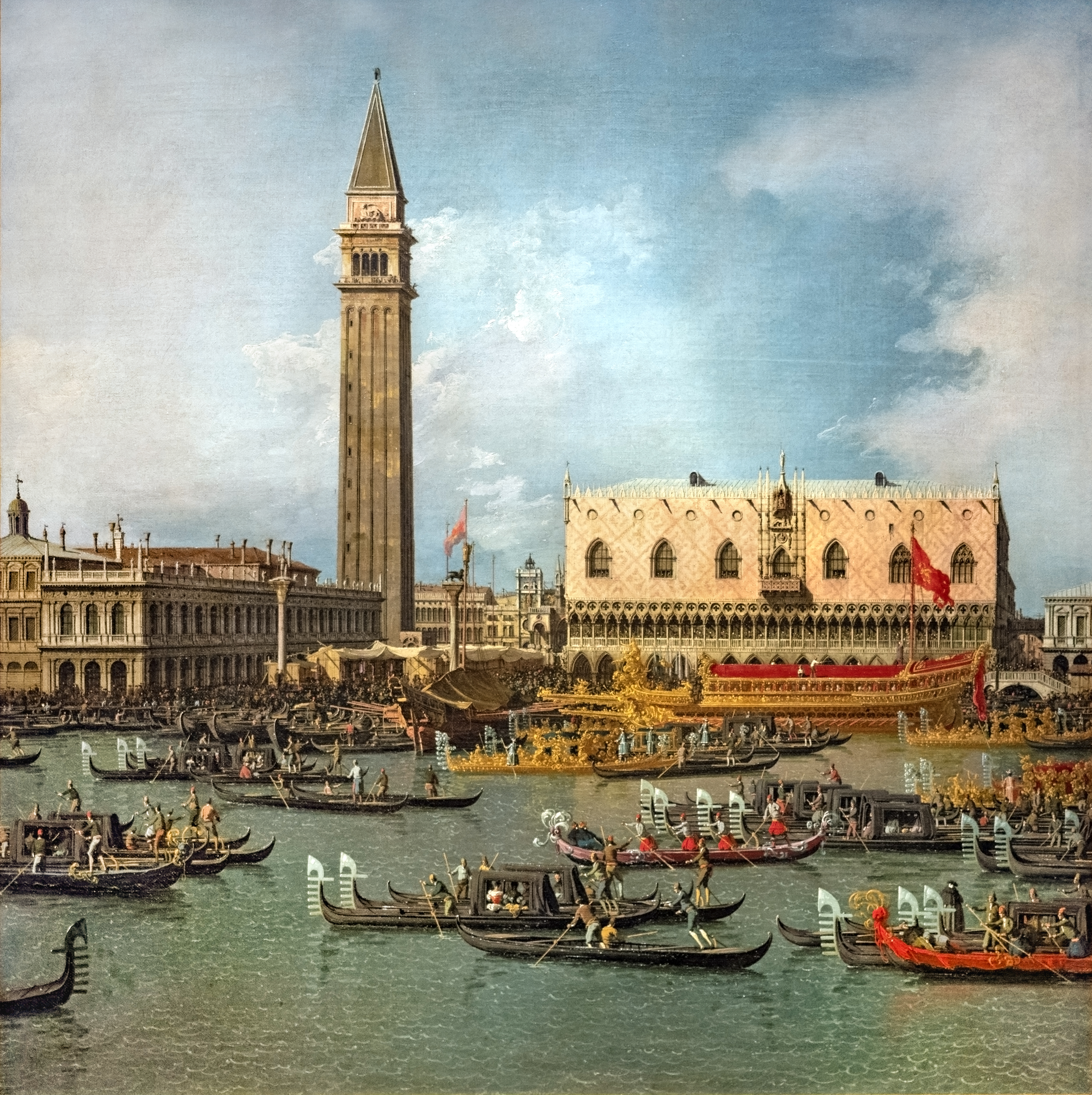
One of Canaletto's views of Venice

== See also ==
- Italian Rococo interior design
