= Tredesin de Mars =

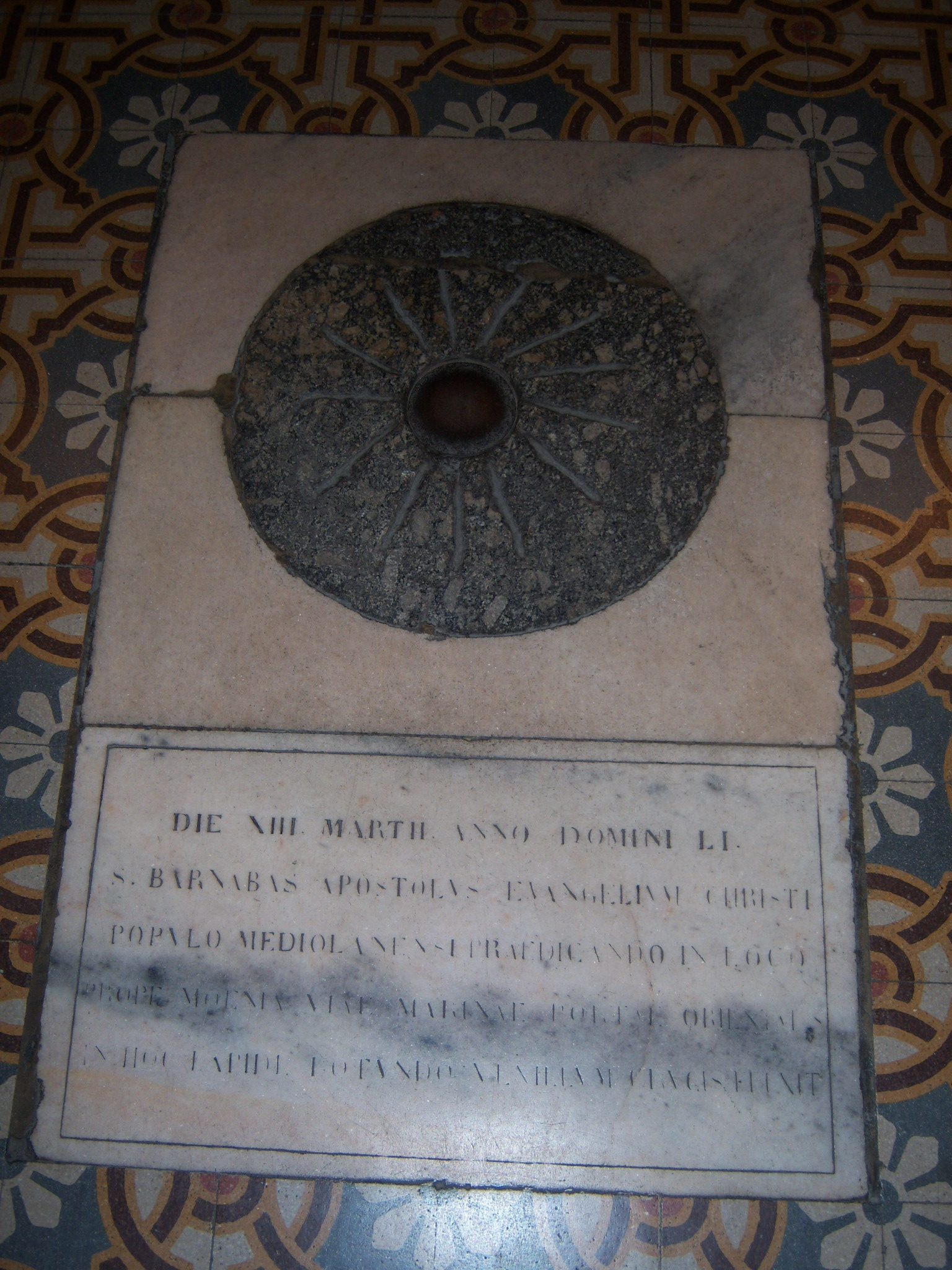
The stone of the Tredesin de Mars in Santa Maria al Paradiso

El Tredesin de Mars (also spelled Tredezin de Marz; in the Milanese dialect, "The 13th of March") is a traditional festivity in Milan, Italy, which takes place on March 13. In the days of the festivity, a flower fair is traditionally held in the area of Porta Romana. The festivity is associated with the beginning of Spring.

According to a local legend dating back at least to the 15th century, the Tredesin commemorates the announcement of Christianity to the people of Milan by Barnabas, supposedly on March 13, 51 a.C., when Barnabas drove a cross on a round stone decorated with a central hole and 13 radiuses. Where Barnaba walked, snow would melt and flowers would appear. A stone preserved in the church of Santa Maria al Paradiso, in the surroundings of Porta Vigentina, is associated to the legend.

Both the stone of the Tredesin de Mars and the flower fair are supposed to be connected to a pre-Christian Celtic spring rite of the Insubres people living in the area. It has been suggested that the stone was originally a Celtic tombstone; the central hole was possibly intended to let the spirit of the dead fly away. The stone was originally found in a cemetery, and later associated to the legend of Barnabas and moved to its current location in the church of Santa Maria.
