= Giovanni Battista Sassi =

Italian painter (1679–1762)

- 18th-century portrait of Giovanni Battista Sassi (Pinacoteca Ambrosiana)
- Born: 1679; Milan
- Died: 1762 (aged 82–83); Milan
- Known for: Painting

Giovanni Battista Sassi (1679 in Milan – 1762 in Milan) was an Italian painter, active mainly in Milan and other areas of Lombardy, who painted in a late-Baroque and Rococo style.

== Biography ==
Born in Lombardy, he first trained with Federigo Panza, then moved to study painting in the studio of the Neapolitan painter Francesco Solimena. His first works in Milan date from 1716. In the church of San Pietro in Verzolo in Pavia, above the altar, there is a canvas depicting the Virgin and Child with Saint Bernard, dated 1713, and in the church of San Giovanni Domnarum the altarpiece with Saint Andrew. His brother was a Prefect of the Accademia Ambrosiana and thus member of the Academy of Design. He painted frescos for the Palazzo Modigliani in Lodi, the Palazzo Brentano of Corbetta, where other artists such as Mattia Bortoloni, Giovanni Angelo Borroni, Giovanni Antonio Cucchi, and Ferdinando Porta, were working. He helped fresco, along with Cucchi, the ceiling for the Church of San Francesco of Assisi in Brescia. He also painted the altarpiece for the main altar with the Virgin and child with St Zeno, Rusticiano, and Vincenzo de Paoli for the church of San Zeno al Foro of Brescia.

His masterwork is the decoration of the chapel of St Stephen of the Duomo di Monza, where he painted a Burial of St Stephen in 1723. Among his pupils were Francesco Londonio.

== Bibliography ==
- Michael Bryan (1886). Robert Edmund Graves (ed.). Dictionary of Painters and Engravers, Biographical and Critical. Vol. I A-K. London: George Bell and Sons. p. 160. (Original from the Fogg Library; digitized May 18, 2007)
