= Francesco Monti (Bologna) =

Italian painter

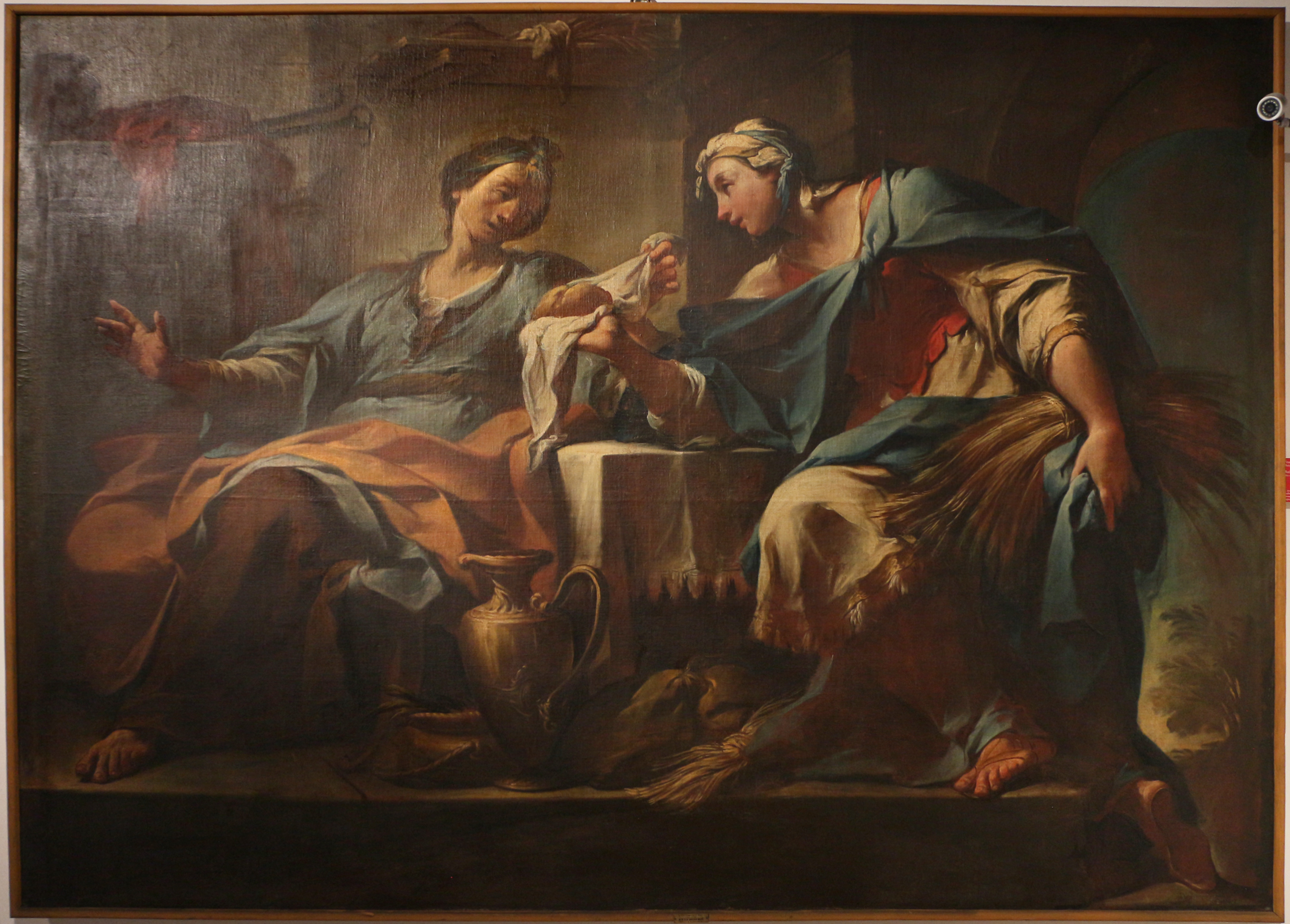
Ruth and her mother-in-law Naomi. Museo Civico de Cremona

Francesco Monti (1685 – 14 April 1768) was an Italian painter of the late Baroque.

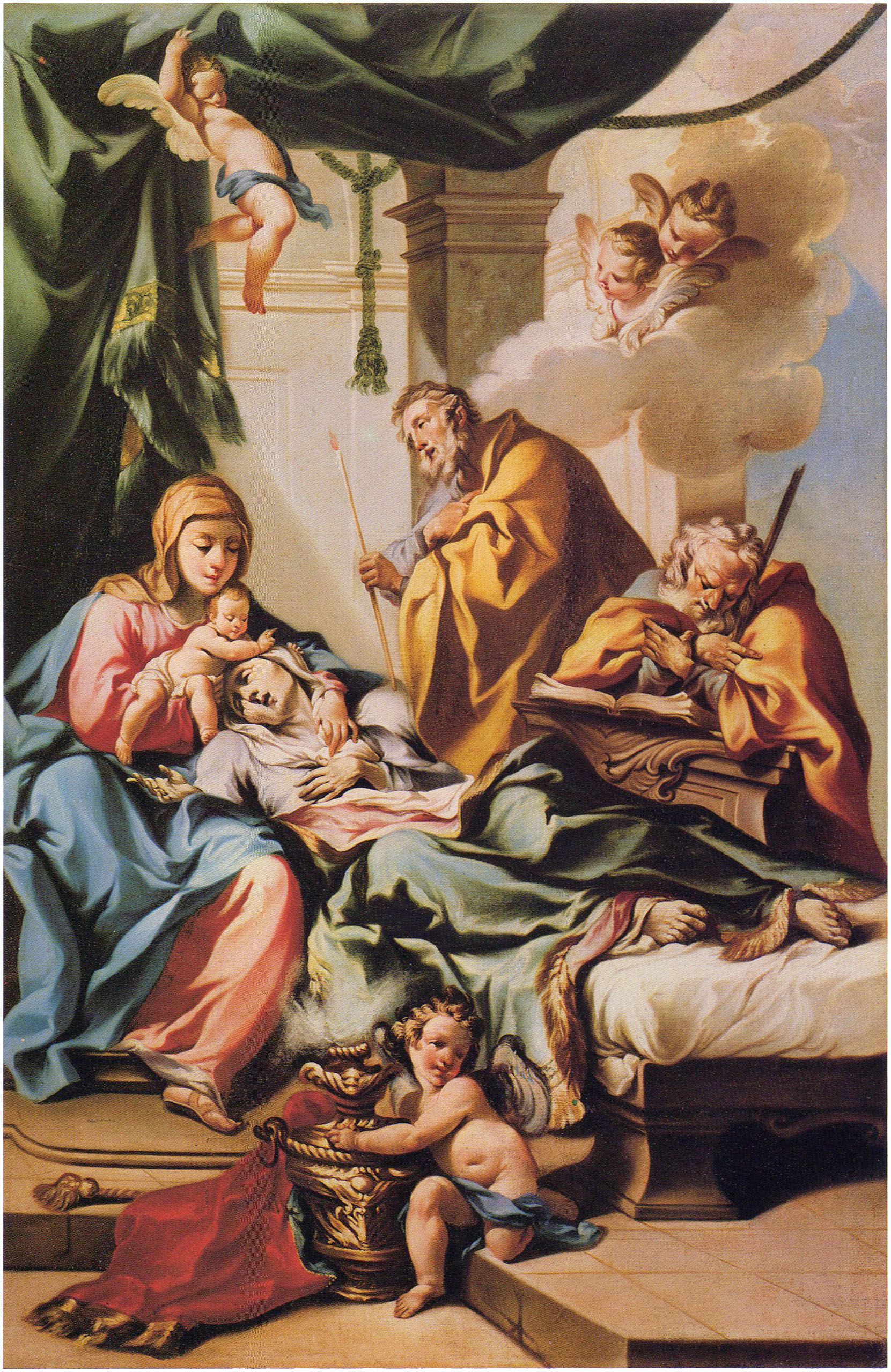
Death of St Anne, originally in the church of San Zeno al Foro, Brescia.

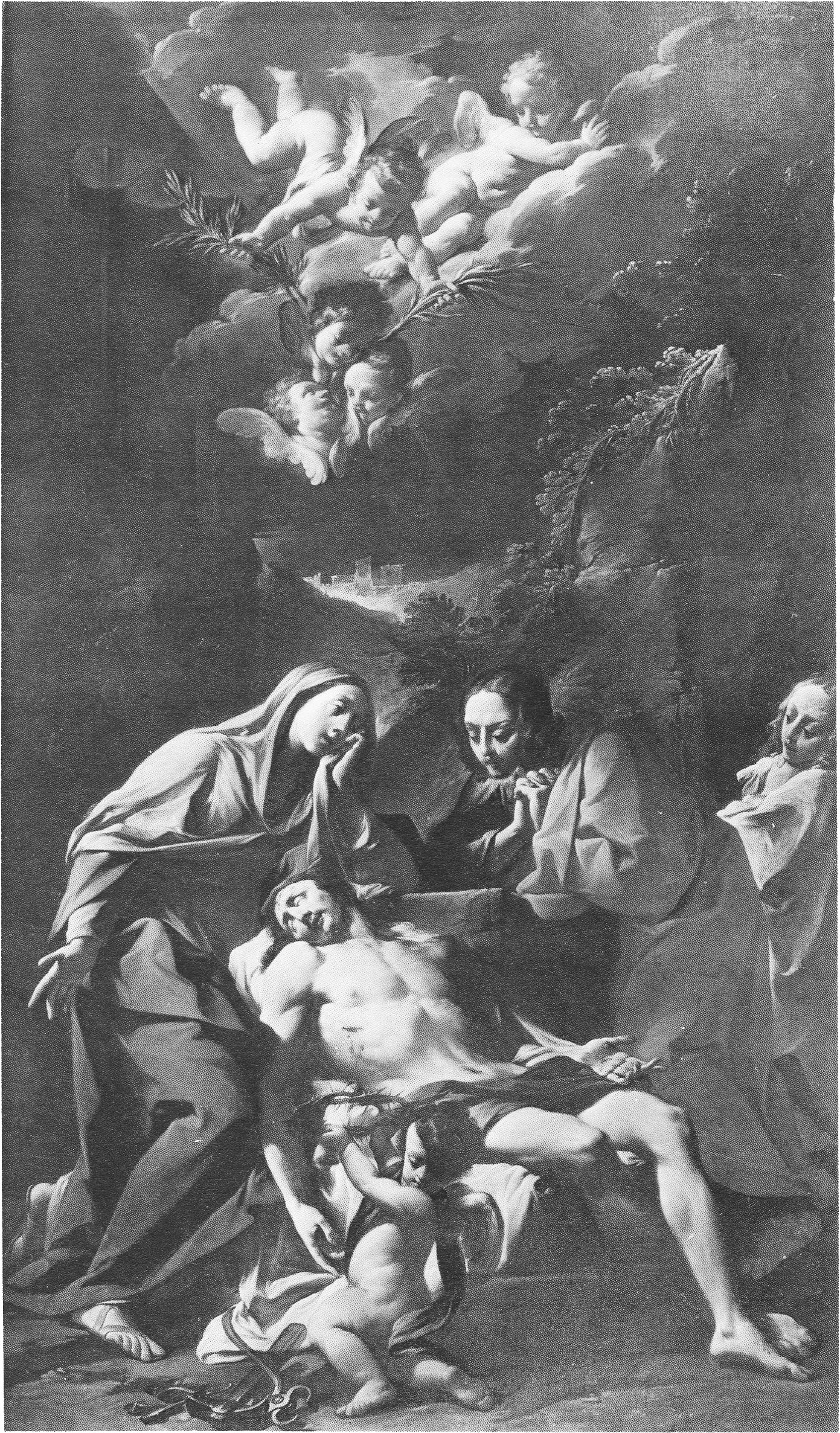
Piety of San Zeno, originally in the church of San Zeno al Foro, Brescia.

== Biography ==
Born in Bologna, he studied art for three years with Sigismondo Caula in Modena, and then starting in 1701 with Giovanni Gioseffo dal Sole in Bologna. His neo-Mannerist style was influenced by Donato Creti, Giuseppe Maria Crespi, and Parmigianino. A prolific painter, he worked in oil and in fresco.

His first known work, dating from 1713, is a Pentecost for the Basilica of San Prospero in Reggio Emilia. Other early works include a Rape of the Sabines for Count Ranuzzi and a Triumph of Mordecai for the court at Turin. Around this time, he was commissioned, along with other painters, to provide decorations for the Duke of Richmond's Goodwood Palace. He also executed commissions for a number of churches in Bolognia. Within a few years, he was admitted to the prestigious Accademia Clementina.

In 1738, he moved to Brescia, where he painted frescoes on the vault of the church of Santa Maria della Pace. He received other commissions from regional churches in San Zeno, Capo di Ponte, Chiari, Sale Marasino, and elsewhere. From 1740 onwards, he was also active in the area of Cremona.

Among his pupils were Gaetano Sabadini, his daughter Eleonora Monti, and the priest Antonio Montelatici.

He died in Brescia.
