= San Pietro in Verzolo =

Church in Pavia, Italy

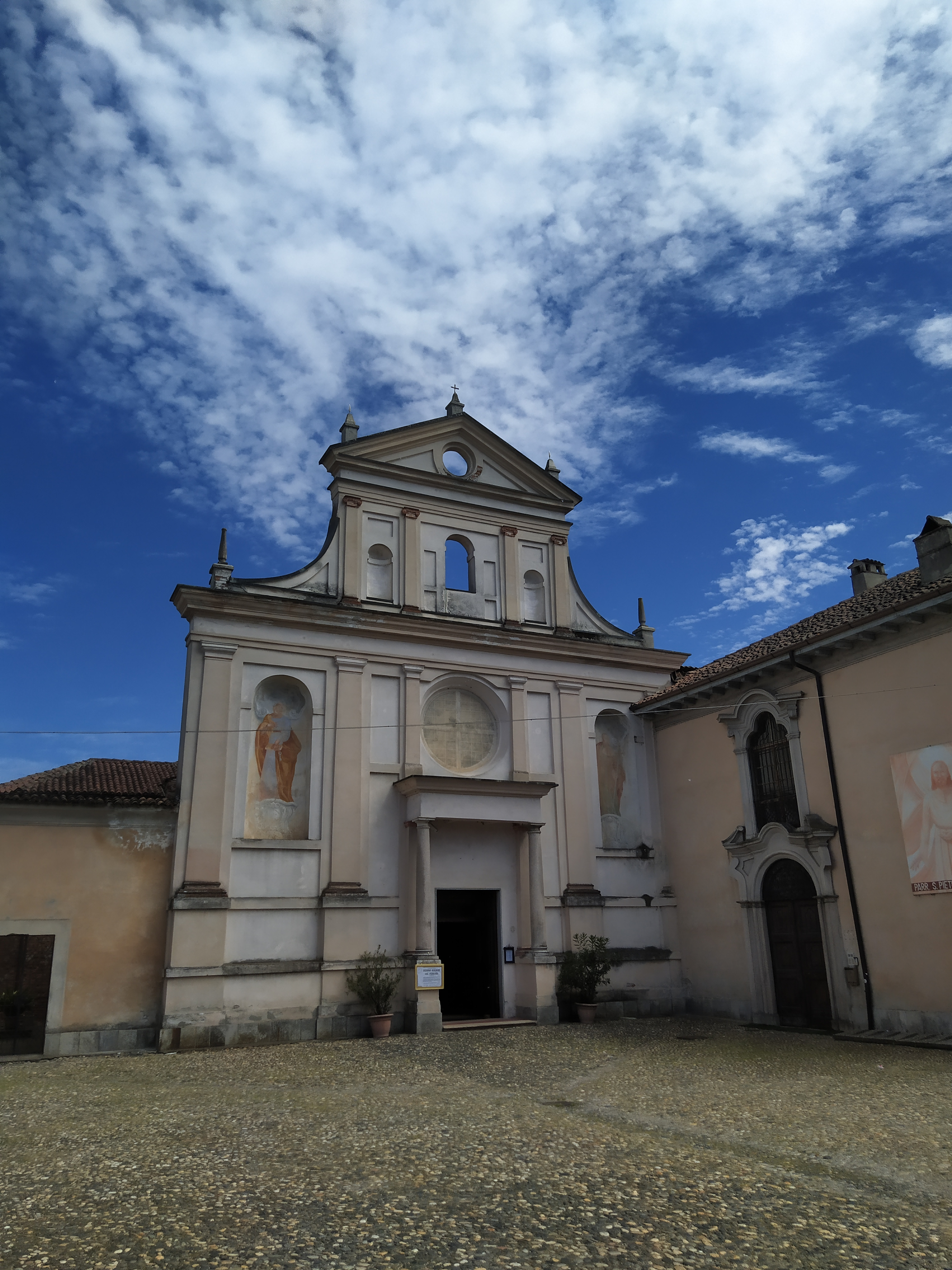
- Façade.

Religion
- Affiliation: Catholic
- Province: Pavia
- Year consecrated: 10th century
- Status: Active

Location
- Location: Pavia, Italy
- Interactive map of San Pietro in Verzolo
- Coordinates: 45°10′50″N 9°10′55″E

Architecture
- Type: Church
- Style: Romanesque, Baroque
- Completed: 16th century

The Church of San Pietro in Verzolo is located on the eastern outskirts of Pavia, Italy, along the Via Francigena.

== History ==
The church was built outside the walls of Pavia and along the ancient Roman road that connected Pavia with Cremona and Piacenza already during the Lombard Kingdom, in 737, in fact, the bishop Theodore of Pavia, while returning from Rome, was welcomed by the inhabitants of Pavia at the church. In 929, to prevent the plague epidemic that raged in the city, King Hugh of Italy brought to Pavia the relics of Saint Columbanus, which, before being deposed in the Basilica of San Michele Maggiore, were exposed in the church of Saint Peter "of the lepers". Probably therefore, in the 10th century the church also housed a hospital for the treatment of leprosy patients.

Around the first years of the 11th century, the monastery of Santa Maria Teodote founded a male Benedictine monastery at the church, which in the 12th century managed to become independent of Santa Maria Teodote.

In 1238 Bishop Rodobaldo II granted the church the title of parish and in 1250, in the tax registers of the municipality of Pavia, the parishes, although located outside the city walls, was included in those of Porta Palacense. Also during the 13th century, around the church and along the road were several houses and taverns, so that the population of the parish, around the beginning of the 14th century, could count about 300 inhabitants. From at least 1315, the church and the monastery came under the control of the aristocratic Astari family of Pavia, who succeeded in imposing, at least until 1486, many abbots selected from the members of the family. In 1397, Gian Galeazzo Visconti, before being proclaimed count of Pavia in the basilica of San Michele Maggiore, stopped in the church, where he received homage from the authorities and aristocrats of Pavia, who organized a tournament in the square of the church in his honor. In 1486 the Benedictines left the monastery and were replaced by the Cistercians of Chiaravalle Abbey. Between October 1524 and February 1525, during the siege that preceded the Battle of Pavia, the monastery and the village around the church were occupied by Swiss mercenaries hired by the King of France Francis I and were devastated, so that the inhabitants and monks had to take refuge inside the walls of Pavia. In 1798 the Cisalpine Republic suppressed the monastery, which was partly sold to private individuals, while the church was transformed into a parish. The population of the parish was 1056 in 1807, rising to 1545 in 1877.

== Architecture ==
Despite the numerous building interventions that have upset the appearance of the church and the monastery, most of the walls of the two buildings date back to the first half of the 11th century and are made by reusing bricks from the Roman era (probably recovered from buildings of ancient times) and big river stones. Originally the building had three naves, punctuated by rectangular pillars, the apse was semicircular, while the roof was wooden trusses. Next to the structure there was a massive bell tower (of which some remains are preserved), instead, to the south, the church was connected to the monastery through a small cloister, which overlooked the chapter house, currently occupied by the sacristy. In the last decades of the 16th century the church and the monastery underwent profound renovations that modified the Romanesque buildings. The church was lengthened, and this operation caused the demolition of the original facade, which was replaced with a new facade, much higher than the body of the building, and equipped with rose window, niches and portal supported by columns. The interior of the building also underwent drastic changes: under the medieval wooden roof, vaults were made, which significantly lowered the ceiling height of the church, but which allowed the preservation, in the attic, fragments of 15th-century frescoes.

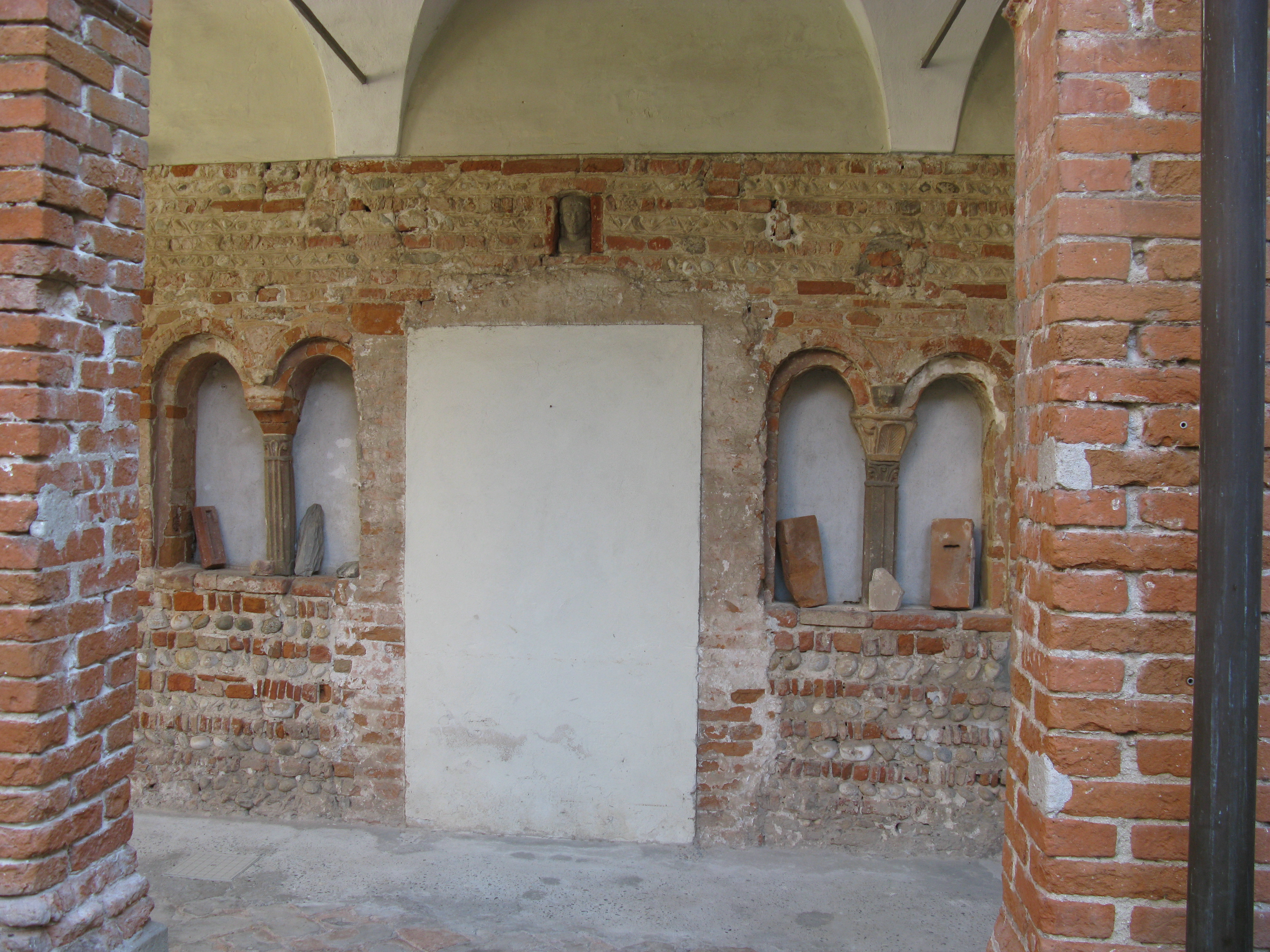
The two mullioned windows are found in the cloister (11th century), one of which (right) reuses a capital from the Lombard period. Above the two mullioned windows there is a small Roman bust inserted in the wall.

To the south of the small cloister, completely modified in 1609, was built in 1571 a larger one (unfortunately demolished in the 19th century) supported by columns. Other works were carried out in the eighteenth century, when the Romanesque bell tower was demolished, replaced in 1708 by a new Baroque bell tower, the apse was enlarged and rebuilt, while on the sides of the church rose, in 1716, two large rectangular chapels. Evidence of the original Romanesque church are the four the mullioned windows of the central nave and the two mullioned windows resurfaced during some restorations in the small cloister, one of which reuses a Lombard capital, perhaps coming from a previous building, above which is walled a small male bust in stone of the Roman age. Inside, above the altar (made in 1708) there is a large canvas by Giovanni Battista Sassi dated 1713 and depicting Saint Bernard kneeling at the feet of the Virgin.
