= Martino Bassi =

Italian architect

Martino Bassi (1542–1591) was an Italian architect active in the Renaissance period, mainly in Milan. He was born in Seregno near Milan. He was involved in a public dispute regarding the baptistery of the Cathedral of Milan. He helped build the imposing facade of Santa Maria presso San Celso. He also built the church of Santa Maria al Paradiso.

== Bibliography ==
- C.Baroni, L'architettura lombarda da Bramante al Richini, Milan, 1941
- F.B.Ferrari, Vita di Martino Bassi, architetto milanese (Life of Martino Bassi, Milanese Architect), Brescia, 1771
