= Antonio Paglia =

Italian painter (1680–1747)

- Born: 1680; Brescia, Republic of Venice
- Died: 1747 (aged 66–67); Brescia, Republic of Venice
- Known for: Painting

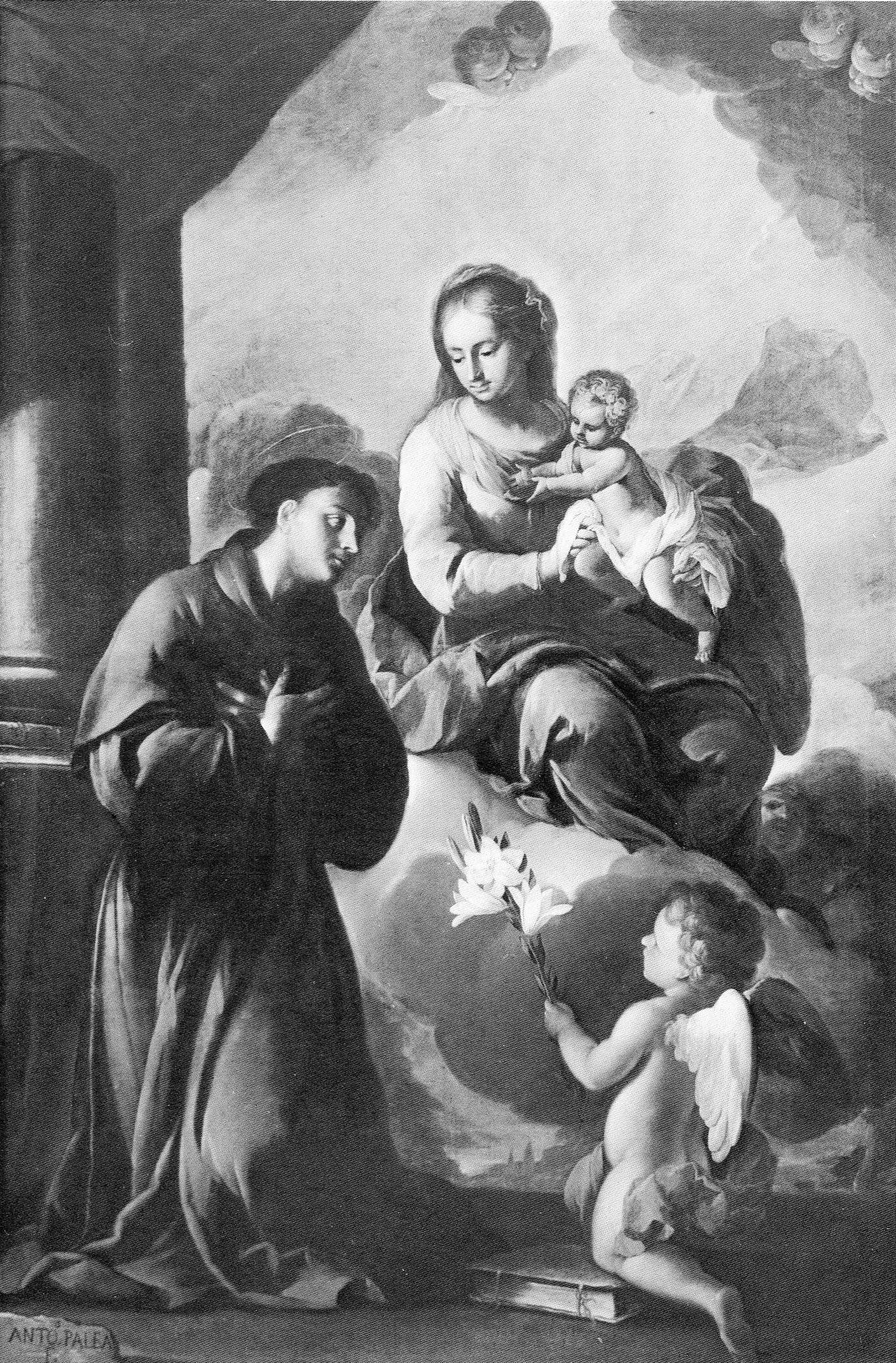
Madonna with child and St Anthony, 1710, Santa Maria in Calchera, Brescia.

Antonio Paglia (1680 in Brescia – 1747 in Brescia) was an Italian painter active mainly in Brescia in a late-Baroque or Rococo style. He was the son of the Baroque painter Francesco Paglia. He collaborated with his brother Angelo. He apparently traveled after 1714 to Venice to apprentice with Sebastiano Ricci. By 1718, he had returned to Brescia, where he specialized in painting altarpieces and religious frescos. Among his main works is a large decorative cycle for the parish church of Chiari.

== Works ==
- St Anthony of Padua, 1710, parish church of Vilminore.
- St Anthony of Padua, 1710, parish church of Gazzolo.
- Madonna with child and St Anthony of Padua, 1710, church of Santa Maria in Calchera, Brescia.
- Martyrdom of St Jacob Apostle, 1711, parish church of Ospitaletto.
- Immaculate Conception, parish church of Rovato.
- St John, 1726, church of Santa Maria della Carità, Brescia.
- Saints, 1726–27, parish church of Chiari.
- Pietà, 1735, parish church of Gambara.
- Stories from New Testament, 1741, San Zeno al Foro, Brescia
