= Federigo Panza =

Italian painter (1633–1703)

Federico or Federigo Panza (1633 in Milan – 1703) was an Italian painter.

He trained with Carlo Francesco Panfilo in Milan, then traveled to Venice. He painted the ceiling and two large lateral altarpieces for the altar of St Joseph in the church of San Francesco in Milan. He also painted the Hall of the Noble Doctors in the college near the Piazza dei Mercanti. He was knighted by the Duke of Savoy. Giovanni Battista Sassi was briefly one of his pupils.
