= Eleonora Monti =

Italian painter

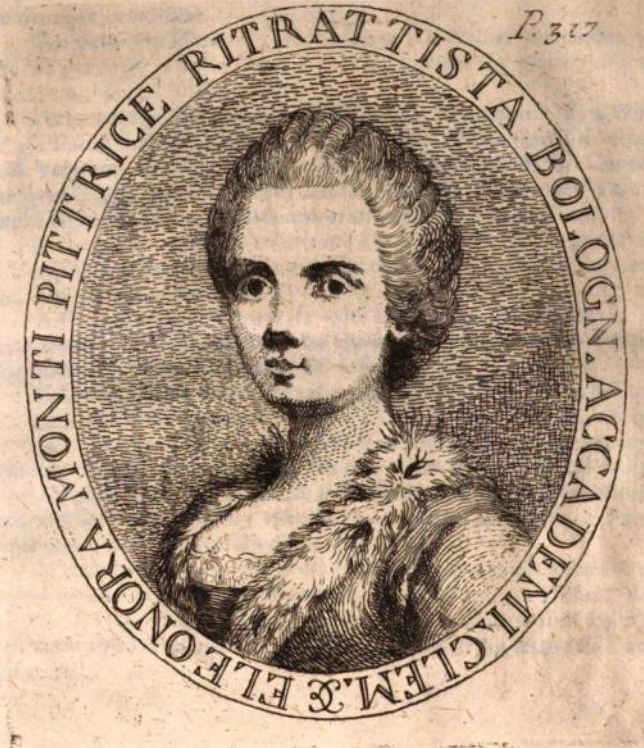
- Monti by Luigi Crespi, 1769
- Born: 20 July 1727
- Died: c. 1765 (aged c. 38)
- Parent(s): Francesco Monti; Teresa Marchioni

Eleonora Monti (20 July 1727 – c. 1765) was an 18th-century Italian artist best known as a portraitist. She spent much of her career in the city of Brescia, Venice, but is also affiliated with the city of Bologna. She was made an honorary member of the Accademia Clementina in Bologna in 1767, one of few women painters at the time to be recognized institutionally.

== Biography ==
Monti was the daughter of Francesco Monti, an artist, and Teresa Marchioni. As her father was known to be in Bologna, Italy, in the 1720s, it is likely that she was born there. He moved to Brescia in 1738, presumably taking his daughter with him, and she appears to have spent most of her career in that city.

Monti showed early aptitude for drawing and painting. Her father began to formally instruct her when she was 12 years old. At first, she produced copies of his prints and then began figure painting. She recopied various subjects proposed by her father in such an exact and measured way, that Elenora decided to dedicated herself to painting portraits, a specialization which required particular precision. She eventually specialized in portraits and became known as a talented portraitist.

In his account of her life, artist Luigi Crespi notes Monti's attention to detail and the wide appeal of her work. He remarks that not only did local people of distinction desire to be portrayed in her portraits, but "intelligent or noble traveller[s]" in the area sought out her skills, as well. Monti's patrons ranged from ladies and gentlemen to monks, nuns, and merchants. She also painted portraits regularly for Brescia nobility. Crespi cites Monti's education, specifically her command of the French language, as an important aspect of her relationship with patrons. The painter Giovanni Zaist commissioned a painting of the Virgin Mary from her. According to Crespi, the Bishop of Brescia, Giovanni Molin, was also an avid supporter of her work. The mayor of Brescia, Piero Andrea Giovannelli, was also a patron.

Monti was made an honorary member of the prestigious Accademia Clementina in Bologna in 1767, a sign of her stature at a time when there were very few recognized women painters. She was one of the artists included in Felsina pittrice, Luigi Crespi's revision of Carlo Cesare Malvasia's book on the painters of Bologna.

According to Amorini, Eleonora Monti died around the end of the 18th century.
