= Francesco Londonio =

Italian painter (1723–1783)

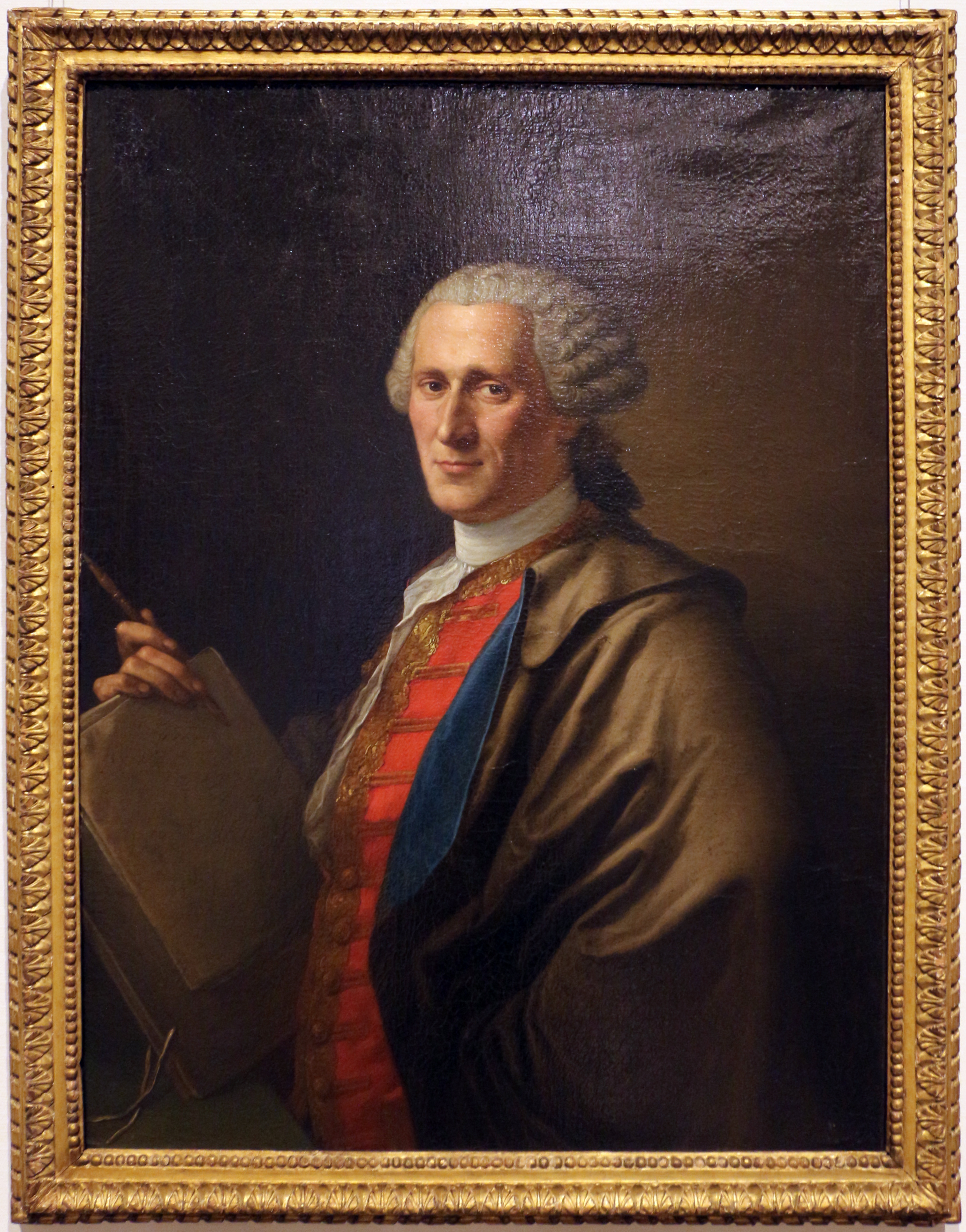
- Self-portrait, circa 1770
- Born: 1723; Milan
- Died: 1783 (aged 59–60); Milan
- Education: Ferdinando Porta, Giovanni Battista Sassi, and Benigno Bossi.
- Known for: Painting, Engraving, and Scenography
- Movement: Rococo, Genre

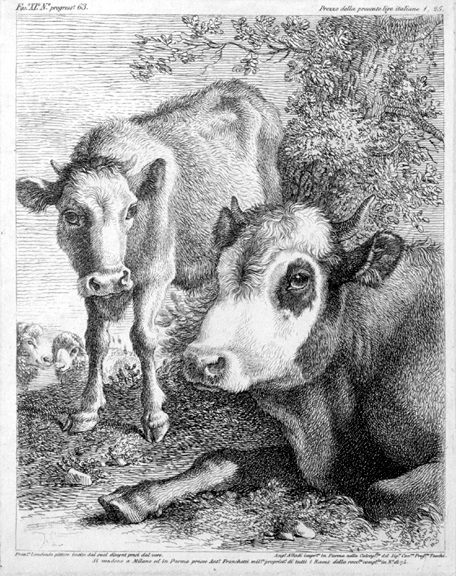
Engraving of Two Cows, c. 1750

Francesco Londonio (1723–1783) was an Italian painter, engraver, and scenographer, active mainly in his native Milan in a late-Baroque or Rococo style.

Londonio trained as a painter under Ferdinando Porta and Giovanni Battista Sassi in Milan, but traveled to Rome and Naples. He studied engraving with Benigno Bossi. He is best known for his paintings and etchings of rustic and pastoral landscapes and subjects, with both animals and peasants playing a dominating role over the landscape. This focus on genre themes was popular among the wealthy patrons of the time, specially in Northern Italy; and artists such as the Brescian painters Ceruti and Cifrondi worked with such themes. In his engravings, he recalls Gaetano Zompini.

Londonio is also known for his scenography. An example of this poorly conserved art form that still exists is a nativity scene on cut wooden shapes for the church of San Marco in Milan. The effect is a cheaper version of the naturalistic Sacri Monti scenes, which had been painted stucco statuary. It also can be seen as a cross between the holy scenes described above, and the theatrical set pieces, for example, those needed for the newly founded La Scala theater. The work at San Marco prompted Empress Maria Theresa of Austria appointed Londonio as art designer for La Scala.

== Sources ==
- Il costume antico e moderno di tutti il populi. Dottor Giulio Ferrario, edizione secunda, Vincenzo Batelli, 1832, volume ottavo parte terza, Florence
- Enciclopedia metodica critico-ragionata delle belle arti . Part 1, Volume 12, Abate Don Pietro Zani, 1822, Parma, Tipografia Ducale.
- Art in Northern Italy (1911) by Corrado Ricci, Editor: Charles Scribner's Sons, page 184.
- Entry for Londonio at commercial site

== Bibliography ==
- L. Böhm, ″Pittori milanesi del Settecento: Francesco Londonio″, in Rivista d'Arte, XVI, 3, 1934, pp. 229–261.
- M. Scola, Catalogo ragionato delle incisioni di Francesco Londonio, Milano 1994
- M. Bona Castellotti, C. Geddo, Francesco Londonio (1723-1783), exhibition catalogue, Galleria Piva, Milano, 1998.
- S. Coppa, C. Geddo, Tra Arcadia e Illuminismo in Lombardia: la raccolta di studi di Francesco Londonio, exhibition catalogue, Pinacoteca di Brera, Milano 2002 (Brera mai vista, 4) .
- C. Geddo, Londonio, Francesco, in Dizionario Biografico degli Italiani, vol. LXV, Roma 2005, pp. 610–613

== Gallery ==
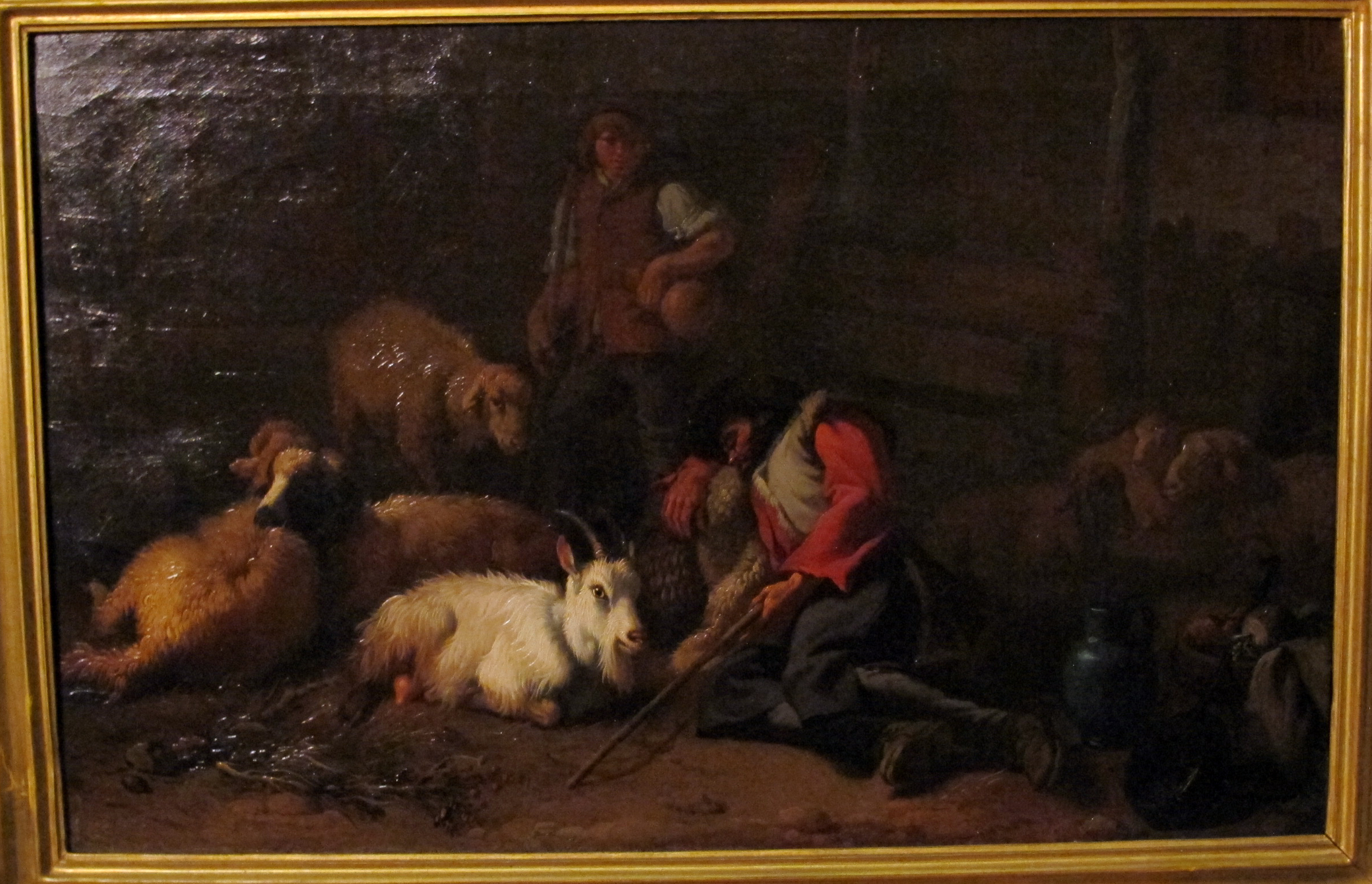
Shepherds with sheep and goat

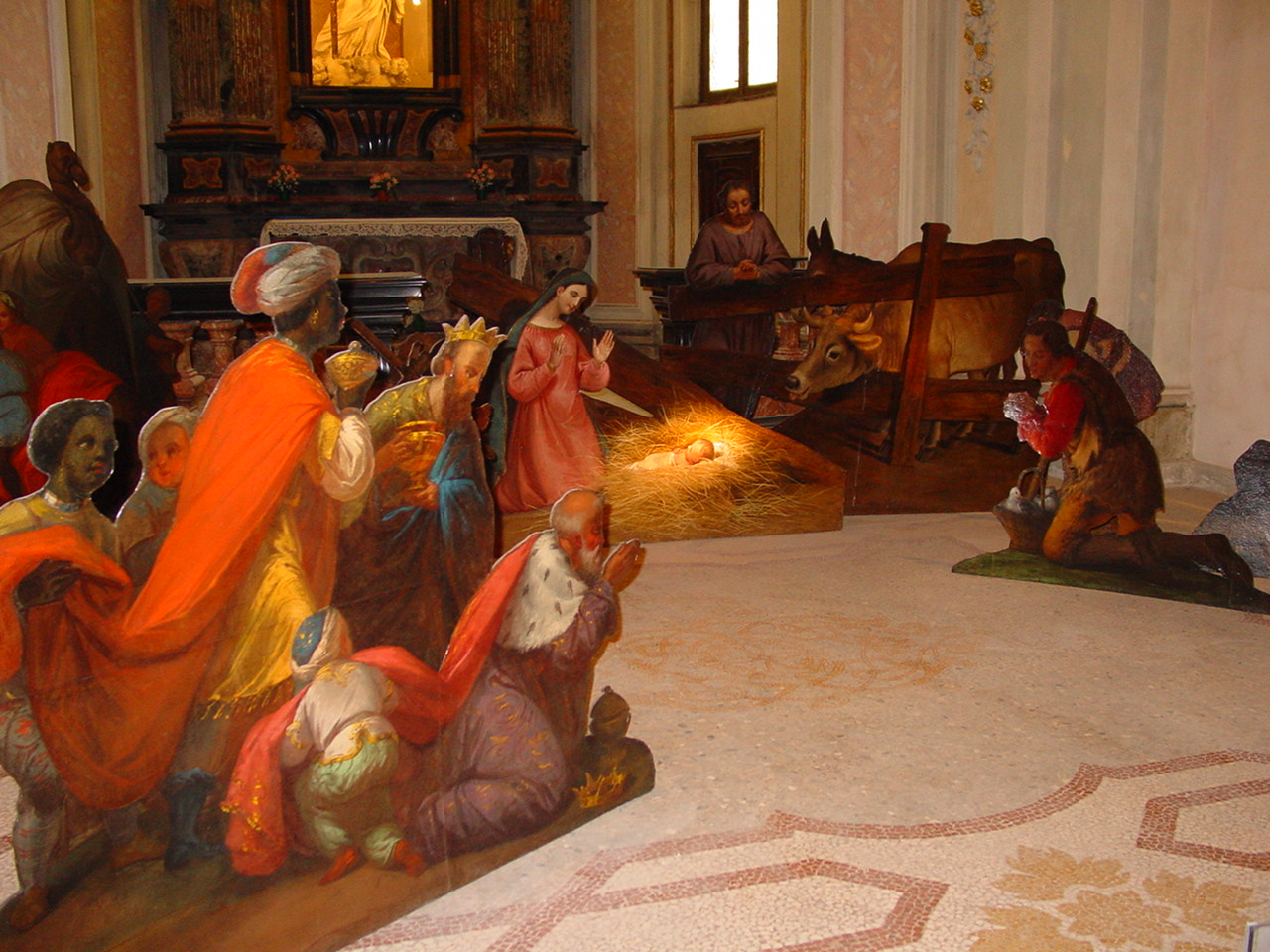
Nativity scene (painted on paper glued to shaped wood panels), San Marco
