= Gaetano Sabatini =

Italian painter

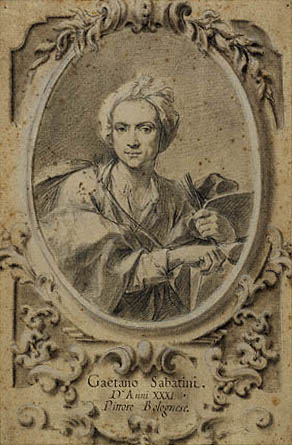
Self-portrait, ca. 1734.

Gaetano Sabatini (1703–1734; or 1731), also known as il Mutarolo (or Il Mutolo) due to his deaf-mutism, was an Italian draftsman and Baroque painter.

Born in Bologna to a domestic worker for the aristocratic Marescalchi family, he perfected his style first in drawing, then in painting. The painter Francesco Monti mentored him as a painter. He painted an altarpiece of the church of the Celestine order in Bologna. He died young in Bologna.

The Getty Museum has a self-portrait by Sabatini.
