= Santa Maria al Paradiso, Milan =

Church in Milan, Italy

Coordinates: 45°27′18″N 9°11′44″E

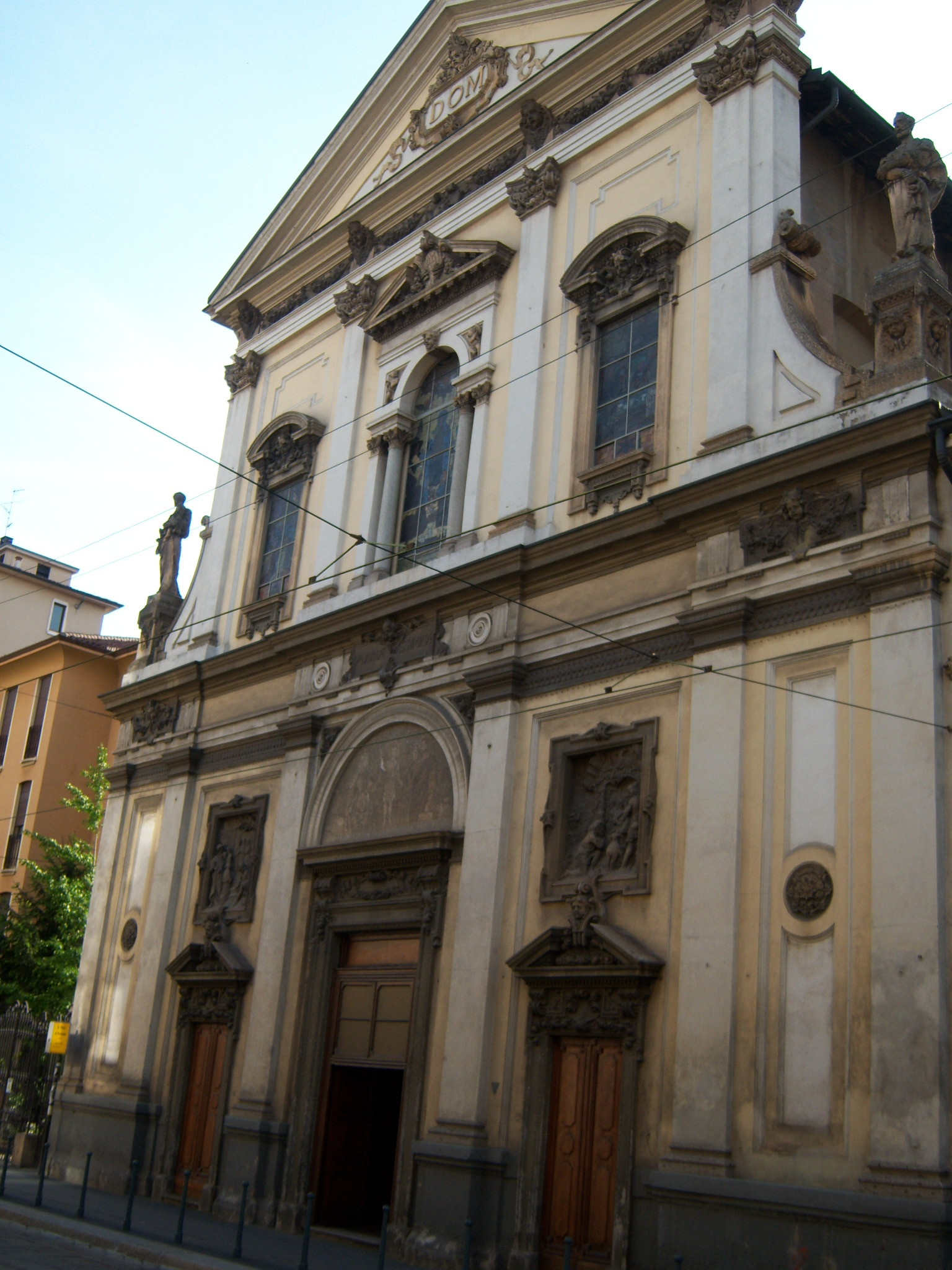

Chiesa di Santa Maria al Paradiso is a church in Milan, Italy. It was begun in 1590 for the Third Order of Saint Francis, after designs by Martino Bassi. The facade, however, was only added in 1897 in a Neo-Baroque style by the architect Ernesto Pirovano (1866–1934).

The interior of the church maintains some of its original decoration, including medallions and stucco depicting scenes from the life of Mary, including The Assumption in the central nave by Ferdinando Porta which obscured the original decoration by Andrea Pellegrini. In the first chapel on the right, there is a Miracle of Angels with St. Isidore and Bonaventure. In the fourth chapel, the St. Anne is attributed to Francesco Fabbrica. On the left side, a chapel is a painting of San Carlo Borromeo meeting with those sick with the Plague by Andrea Porta. The functioning organ was constructed in 1827 by Antonio Brunelli.
