= Andrea Pellegrini =

Danish singer

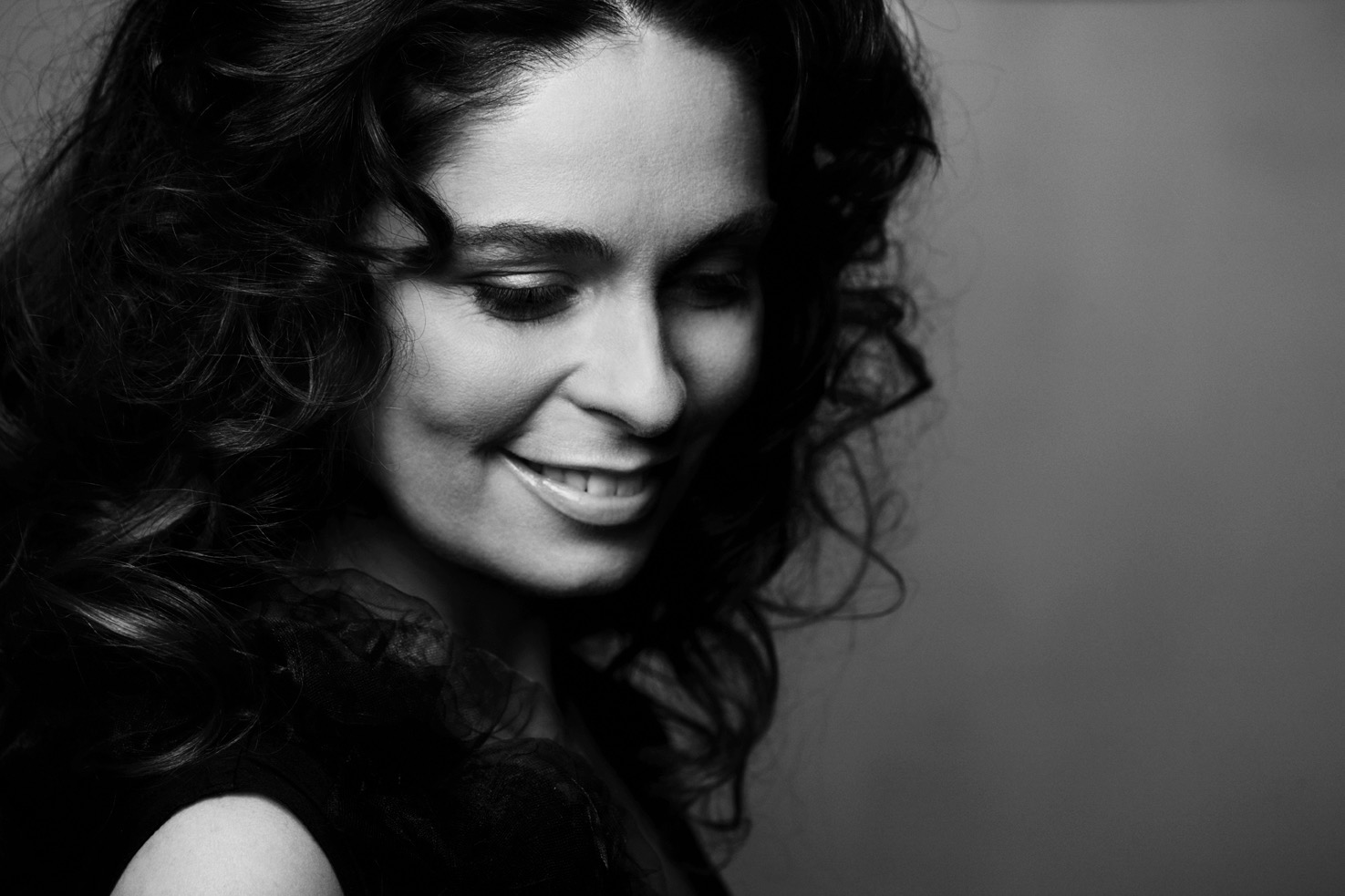

Background information
- Born: 7 November 1975 (age 50); Aarhus, Denmark
- Occupation: singer

Andrea Pellegrini (born 7 November 1975) is a Danish mezzo-soprano. She is the daughter of jazz musician Rolando Pellegrini (Rolly) and lab technician Annelise Pellegrini (née Dahlgaard).

== Career ==
Andrea Pellegrini started playing the piano at the age of seven and received vocal training at 17. She attended the Royal Danish Academy of Music from 1998 to 2003 and continued at the Opera Academy from 2003 to 2006.

She made her debut at the Royal Danish Theatre in 2006 as Rosina in The Barber of Seville. She has also sung Cherubino in Mozart's The Marriage of Figaro, Idamante in Idomeneo, Mercedes in Bizet's Carmen, Suzuki in Puccini's Madama Butterfly, and Adalgisa in Bellini's Norma in productions at the Royal Danish Theatre, Danish National Opera, and Opera Hedeland. She has also performed as a soloist in concerts:

- In oratorios by Bach
- Verdi's Requiem
- Mozart's Requiem
- Dvořák's Requiem
- Pergolesi's Stabat Mater
- Beethoven's 9th Symphony
- Mahler's Des Knaben Wunderhorn and Kindertotenlieder
- Berlioz's Les Nuits d'Été

Andrea Pellegrini has also recorded several CDs with Martin Hall, performed with the band tv·2, and co-founded the tango orchestra The Piazzolla Orchestra.

She has a son born in 2000.

== Discography ==
Participates in:

- John Frandsen: Requiem (2014) Dacapo Records
- Poul Schierbeck: Opera Fête Galante (2013) Dacapo
- Youroland: Requiem Snow falls as snow (2013) Target Records
- Martin Hall: If Power Asks Why (2012) Panoptikon
- J. S. Bach: Christmas Oratorio (2008)
- Peder Gram: Orchestral Works Vol. 2 (2008) Dacapo
- Martin Hall: Hospital Cafeterias (2009) Panoptikon
- Martin Hall: Das mechanische Klavier (2004) Panoptikon
- Martin Hall: Camille (2002) MNW

== Awards and honors ==
- Roager Fund Talent Award (2005)
- Danish Wagner Society Scholarship for Young Singers (2006)
- Reumert Talent Award (2007)
- Music Critics' Circle Artist Award (2008)
- Folmer Jensen's Grant from Tivoli (2009)
- Elisabeth Dons Memorial Grant (2013)
- Aksel Schiøtz Award (2013)
- Veuve Clicquot Champagne Award (2013)
