= Italian Rococo interior design =

Italian Rococo interior design refers to interior decoration (i.e. furniture, frescoing etc.) in Italy during the Rococo period, which went from the early 18th century to around the 1760s.

== History, background and influences ==
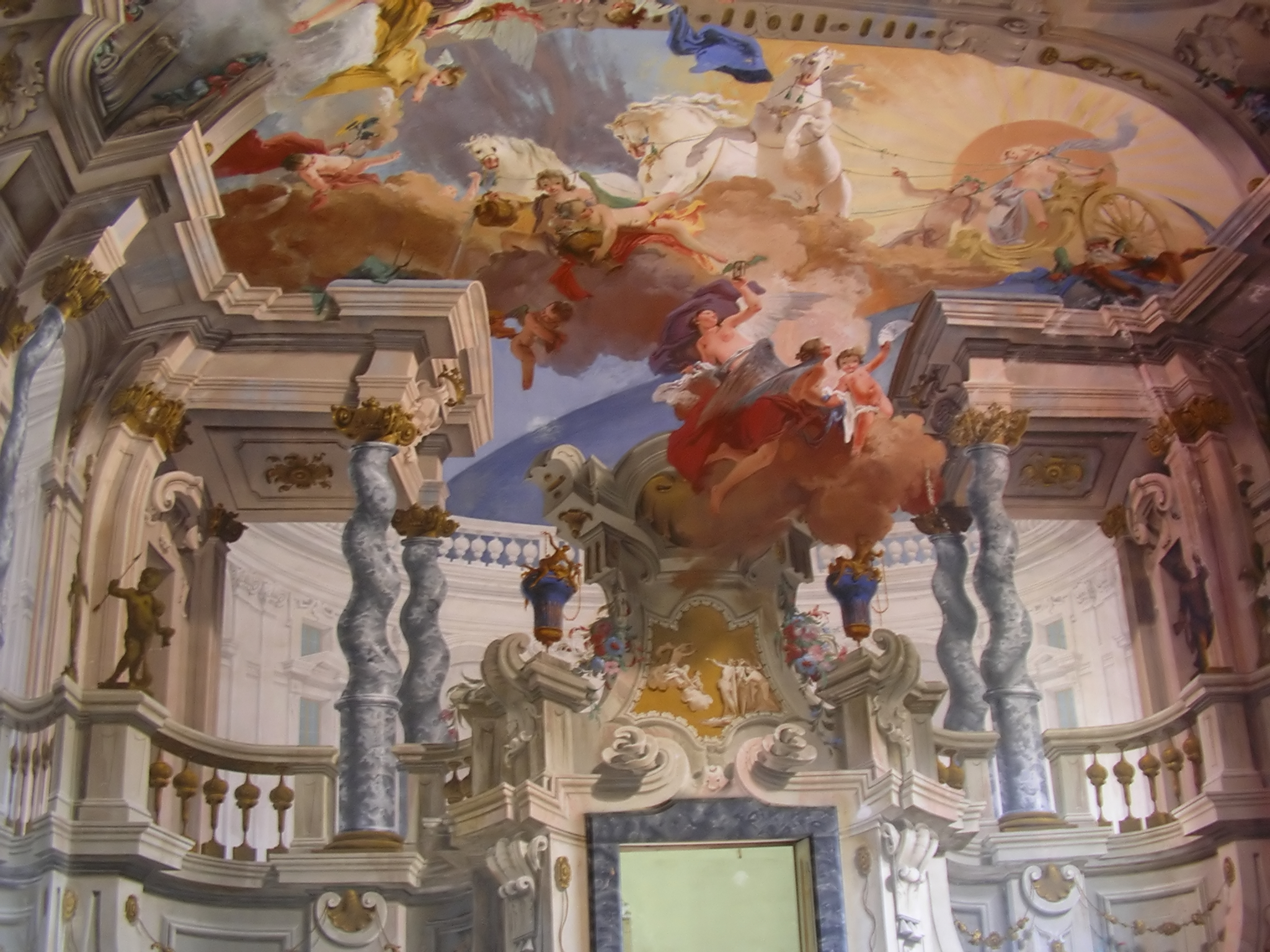
A Rococo fresco in a villa near Milan.

By the early 18th century, Italian states were in a state of trouble. Few had not been conquered by France, Spain or Austria, and only the Republic of Venice, the Republic of Genoa, Lucca and a few other states were still independent. This significant loss of power also resulted in Italy ceding artistic and social authority to France, which in the 18th century took Italy's position as the European cultural leader. Even though Italy still exerted some influence, it was not as much as in the Renaissance and the Baroque periods, and France by then was the cultural leader, from literature, the arts, high culture, architecture and fashion, to science, philosophy, cuisine, music and education. By the early 18th century, the old-fashioned and heavy Baroque style went out of fashion in France, and a new, more feminine and lighter style called the Rococo emerged. Rococo was more delicate and romantic than the heavy and masculine Baroque, and often included features such as coquilles, or shells, and more curved edges. Italy was not immediately influenced by the Rococo, since by the early 18th century rich Italian landowners were still constructing their palaces in the conservative Baroque style, but by the 1710s and 1720s, Italian architecture and interior design became more feminine and lighter.

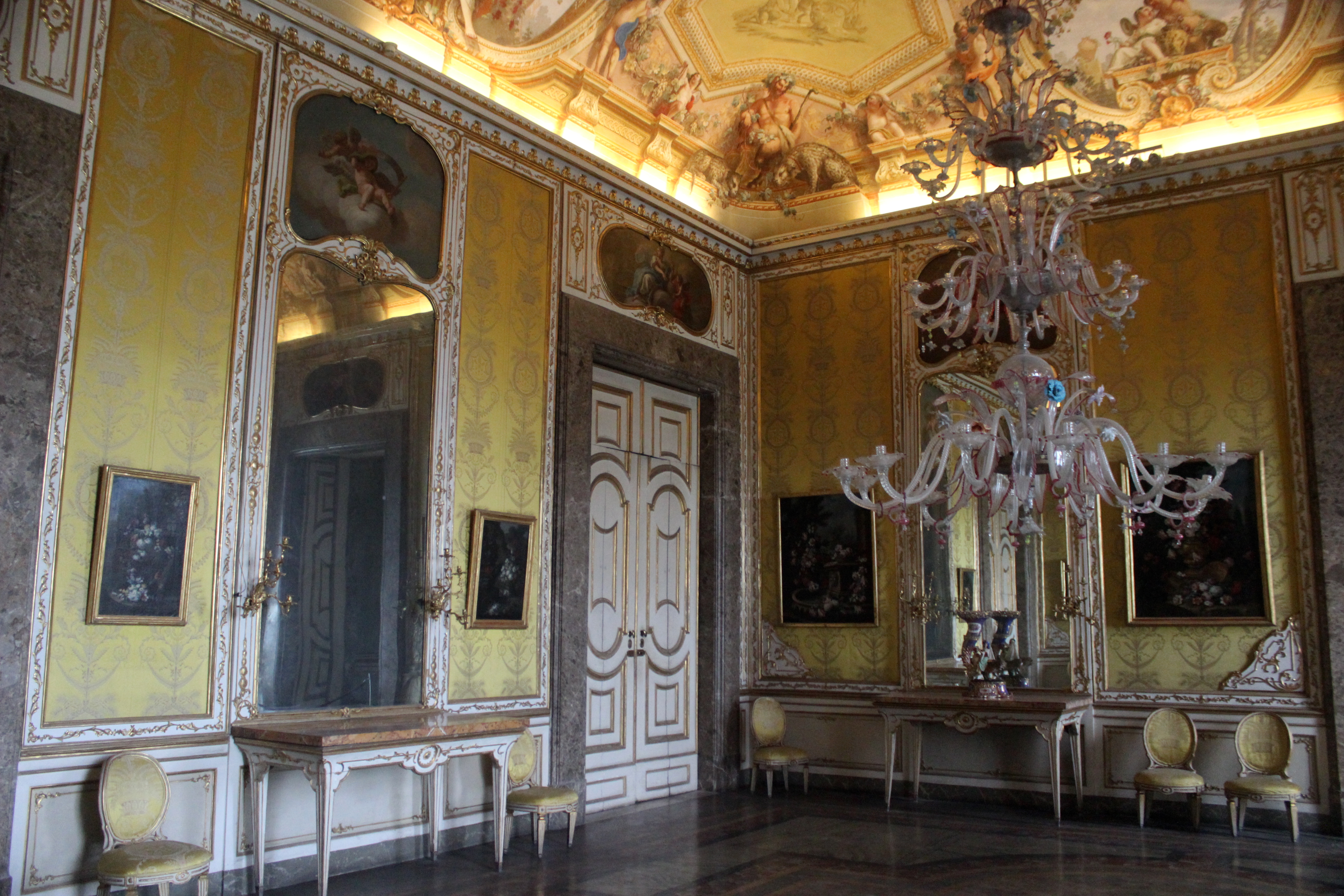
A Rococo room in the Palace of Caserta.

Despite Rococo influences in the early 18th century, true Italian Rococo interiors began to be made in the late 1720s and early 1730s. The grace and charm of Rococo furnishing succeeded the heavy and imposing Baroque style. Italian Rococo interior design was in essence copied from that of the Régence and Louis XV styles. However, some elements were changed, and cities such as Sicily and Venice produced especially unusual Rococo furniture. Italian Rococo furniture was usually upholstered with rich and colourful fabrics, such as velvet and silk, and furniture was usually lacquered. Furniture from Piedmont was typically very French in style, Lombardy produced more sober and wooden furnishings, Genoa was known for its rich fabrics and colourful styles, and Venice for its extravagant and luxurious interiors. Italian chairs and sofas were also greatly inspired by the French fauteils, but Italian seats and settees' backs were usually longer and more fan-shaped, rather than the French ones which were more oblong. As in the Baroque style, furniture for the wealthy was usually gilded with silver, gold or bronze. Middle-class families and Lombard workshops left furniture unpainted, and was often made with fruitwoods or walnut. Armchairs and couches had several cartouches and cabriole legs as in French designs, but usually looked more like joined-together seats in the English fashion. Italian settees tended to be low, and were usually placed in the borders of ballrooms and entrance halls for decoration or for seating at parties and balls.

Console and side tables, however, remained very similar to the Baroque ones, often very rich in decoration, with caryatids and putti, and carvings gilded in gold and bronze. However, one major difference was that tables were given specific roles and were uniquely labelled. Trespoli served as commodes in bedrooms, to hold a candle and possibly some prized possessions and a crucifix, Guérdions were used near sofas for visitors' gloves and other objects, and were often round with a tripod base. Console tables were used at entrances mainly for decoration, and were usually paired with a mirror or painting above.

Another major change from Baroque furnishings was that bureau cabinets or secretary desk surpassed writing tables (used in the 16th and 17th centuries) in popularity. Bureau cabinets were usually ornate, and were considered useful, as one could write, study or prepare oneself, yet store everything at hand. Even though women tended to use the bureaux more than men, they became highly popular with both genders, and even Pope Pius VI had one made for him. Bureau-bookcases were also made, since one could store books and study at the same time, and these too became very popular in the 18th century. They were fully inspired by the English secretary, and were usually made with wood, especially walnut. People of all classes still had a cassone, but credenze (singular: credenza) had become very popular, since they were elongated and refined cupboards. Whether expensive or cheap, credenze were considered elegant.

== Differences in style by region or city ==
=== Sicily ===
Sicilian Rococo furniture tended to be highly unusual, and even though was based on the principles of French Rococo designs, usually included some traditional Sicilian elements. Commodes and console tables had cabriole legs, which were, however, plain, and usually had intricate scrollwork and arabesques. Sicilian tables were often painted, representing typical elements of Sicilian culture, society and life, such as festivals, fruits and Sicilian carts. Such elements made Sicilian Rococo furniture relatively unusual in comparison to some other types.

=== Genoa ===
Genoese Rococo was also highly unusual in style. The Genoese Rococo interior designers were famous for making grand beds and chairs. Genoese armchairs were similar to the French fauteils, but often had a wider, more exaggerated backs, gilded wood, and included intensely rich fabrics, such as silk and velvet.

=== Rome ===
Rome remained possibly the most conservative city in Italy, and noblemen tended to prefer the grandiose majesty of Baroque interiors than the frivolity and grace of its Rococo counterpart. However, there were some elements which made Roman Rococo relatively distinguished, such as the bureau-cabinets made for Pope Pius VI, which were noted for the rich lacquerwork, japanning and its Chinoiserie themed pictures.

=== Sardinia and Piedmont ===
The Kingdom of Sardinia's greatest son in the field of Rococo interior designing was without a doubt Pietro Piffetti (1700–1770), who made Sardinian Rococo so refined and elegant. His works and designs were so high-quality that he was envied across Italy and was a serious contender to French craftsmen and furniture-designers. His famous designs emerged as being Sardinian/Piedmontese and were famous for their highly intricate designs, exotic materials, flamboyant cartouches and the unique tortoiseshells, which became popular under Rococo zenith. Despite this, Rococo interior designing in Piedmont and Turin remained virtually identical to that of France, its closest neighbour.

=== Venice ===
Venice arguably produced the most unusual and refined Rococo designs. At the time, Venice was in a state of trouble. It had lost most of its maritime power, was lagging behind its rivals in political importance and society had become decadent, with nobles wasting their money in gambling and partying. But without a doubt, Venice remained Italy's fashion capital, and was a serious contender to Paris in terms of wealth, architecture, luxury, taste, sophistication, trade, decoration, style and design. Venetian Rococo was well known for being rich and luxurious, with usually very extravagant designs. Unique Venetian furniture, such as the divani da portego, or long Rococo couches and pozzetti, objects meant to be placed against the wall. Venetian bedrooms were usually sumptuous and grand, with rich damask, velvet and silk drapery and curtains, a beautifully carved Rococo beds with statues of putti, flowers and angels. Venice was especially famous for its beautiful girandole mirrors, which remained amongst, if not the, finest in Europe. Chandeliers were usually very colourful, using Murano glass to make them look more vibrant and stand out from others, and precious stones and materials from abroad were used, since Venice still held a vast trade empire. Lacquer was very common, and many items of furniture were covered with it, the most famous being lacca povera (poor lacquer), in which allegories and images of social life were painted. Lacquerwork and Chinoiserie were particularly common in bureau cabinets.

== Gallery ==
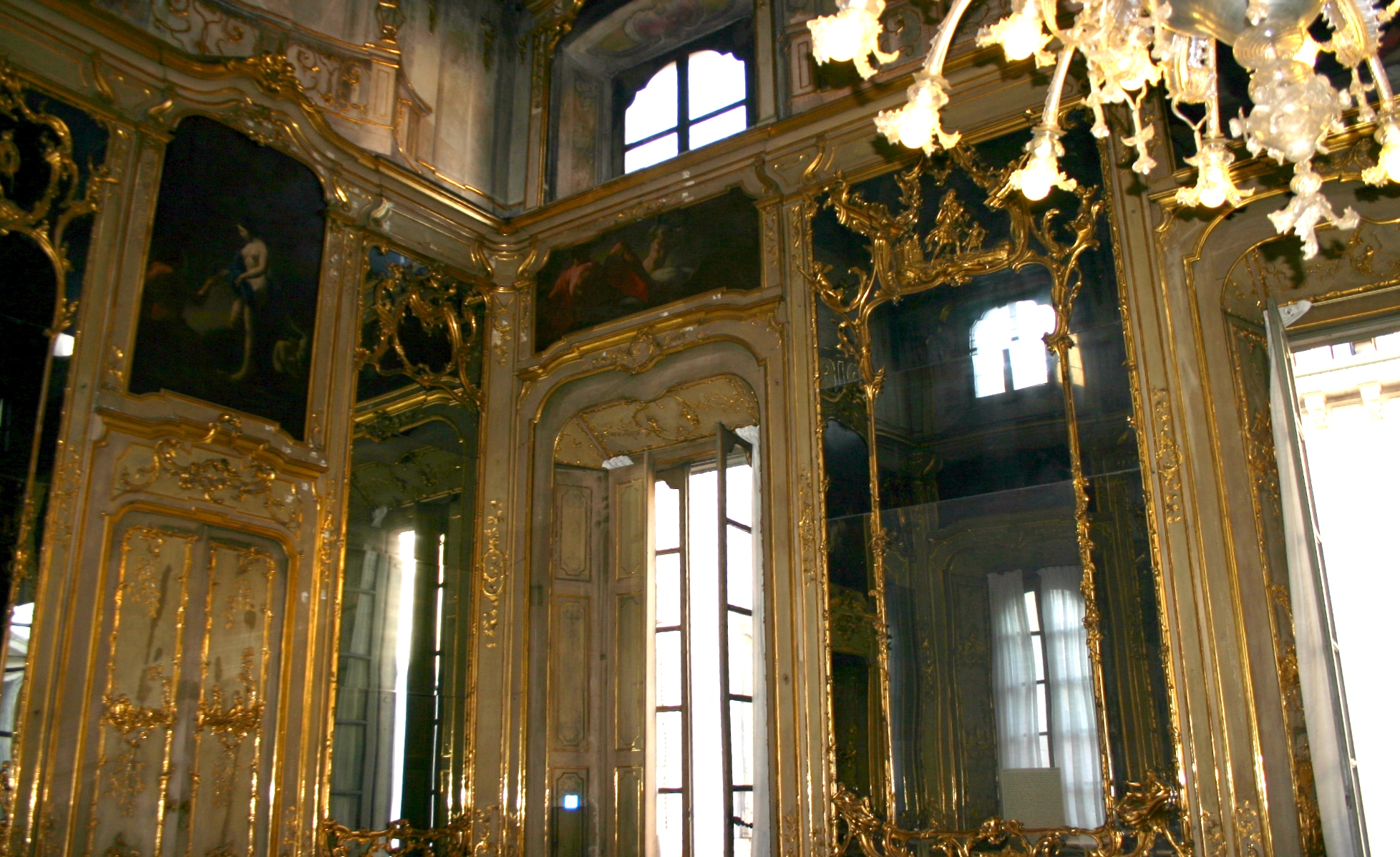
Rococo furnishings inside Milan's Palazzo Litta.

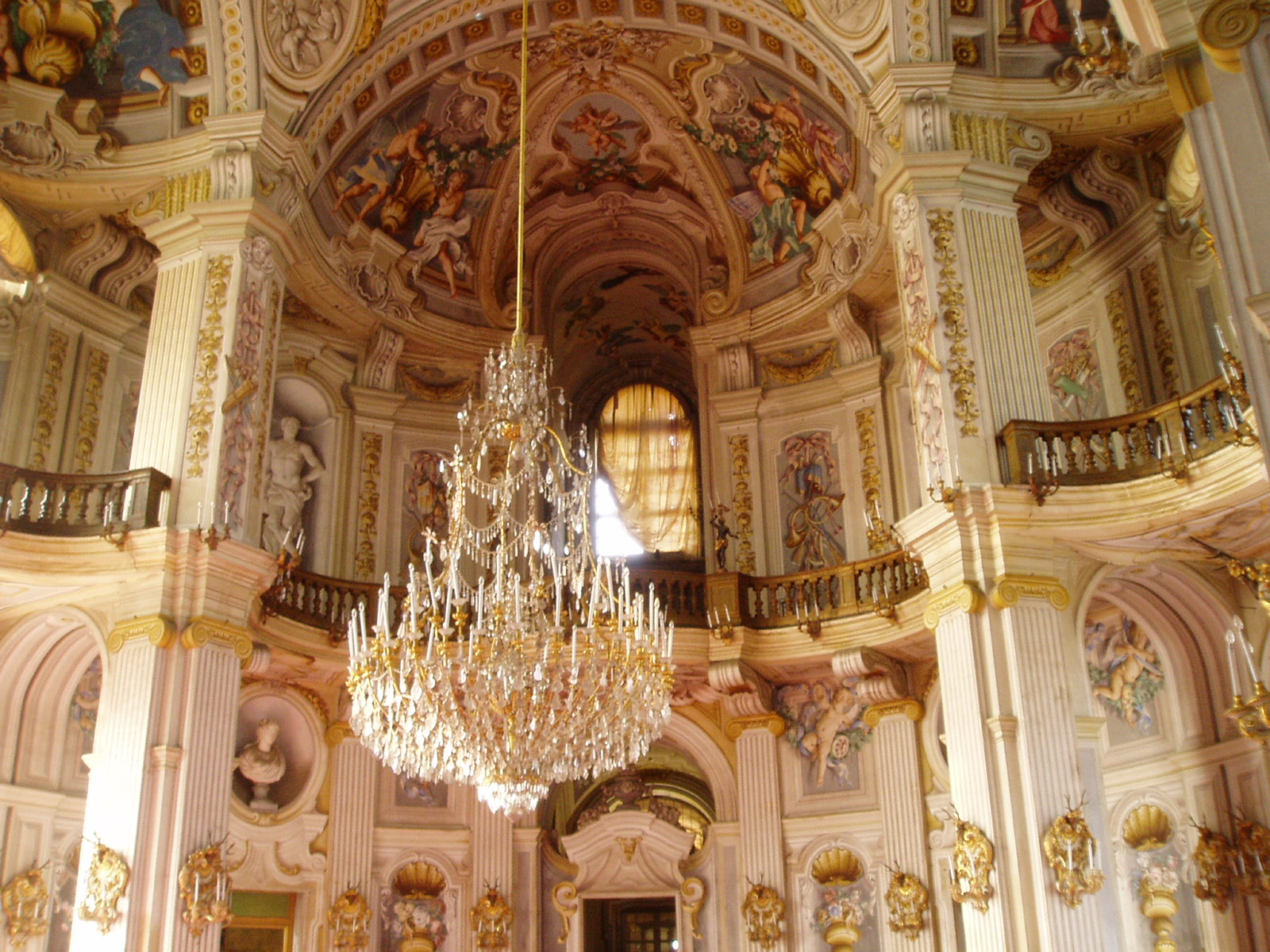
The entrance hall of the Rococo Palazzina di Caccia di Stupinigi

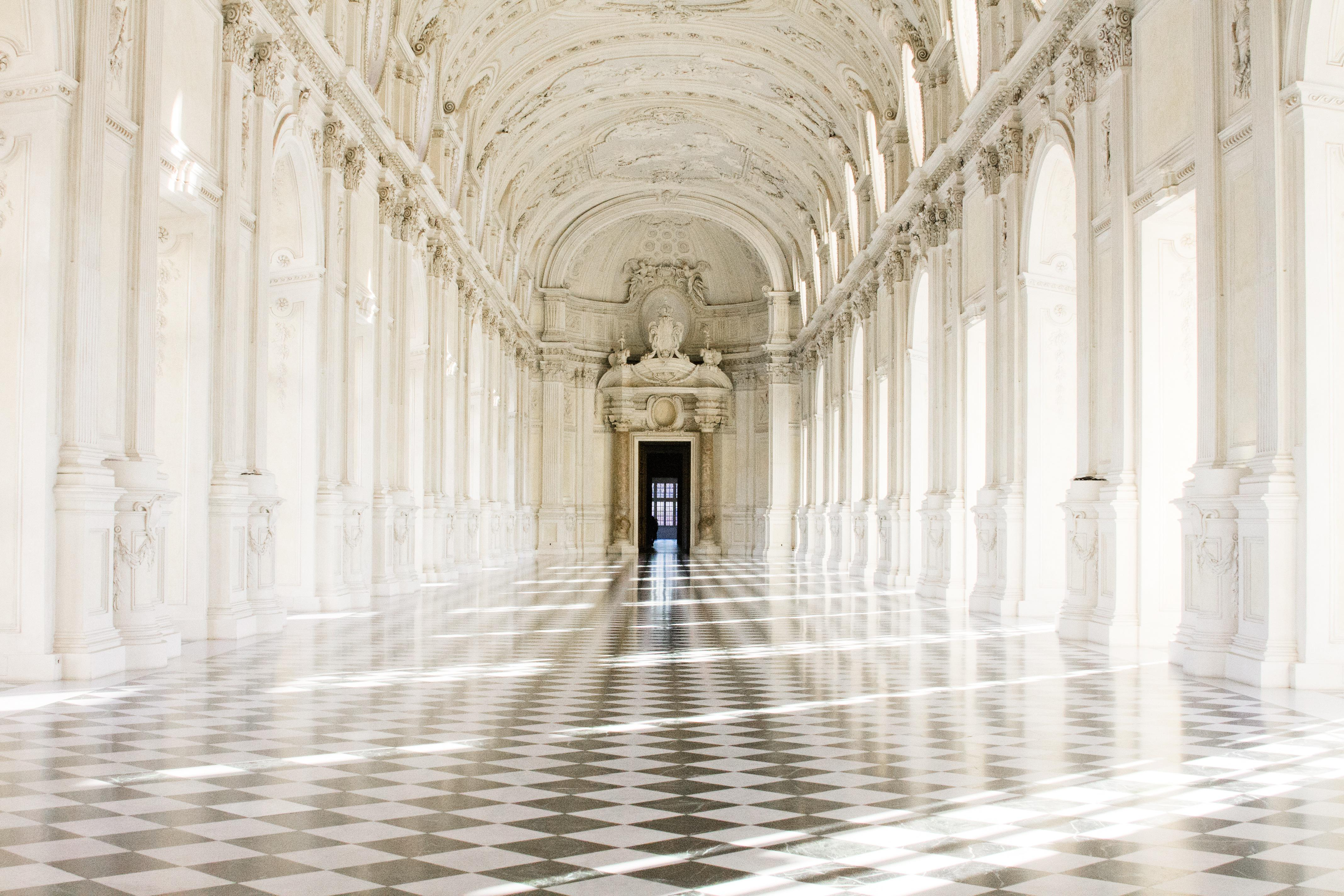
Interior of the Venaria Reale, one of the Royal Residences of the House of Savoy in Piedmont.

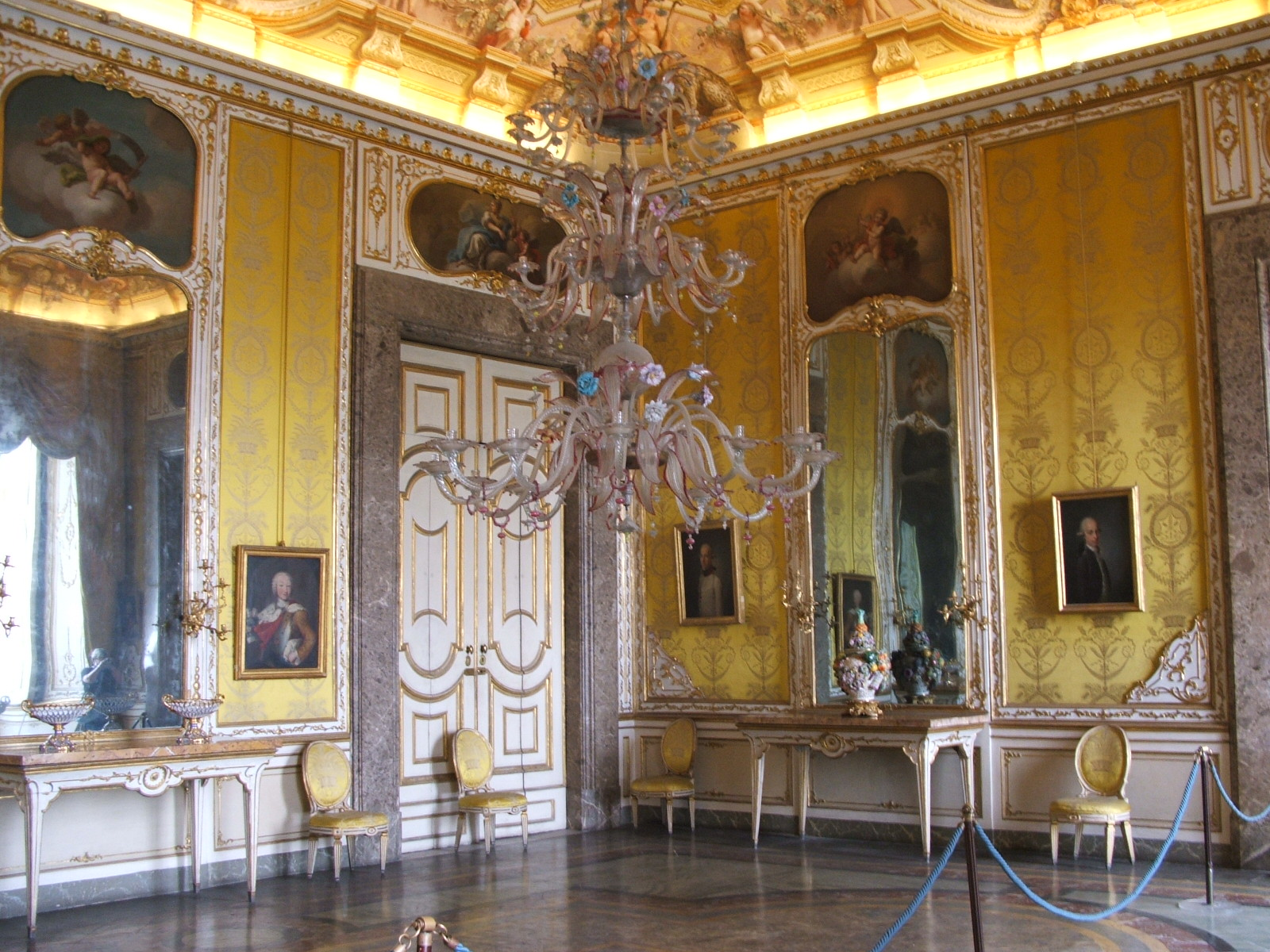
A Rococo room in the Palace of Caserta

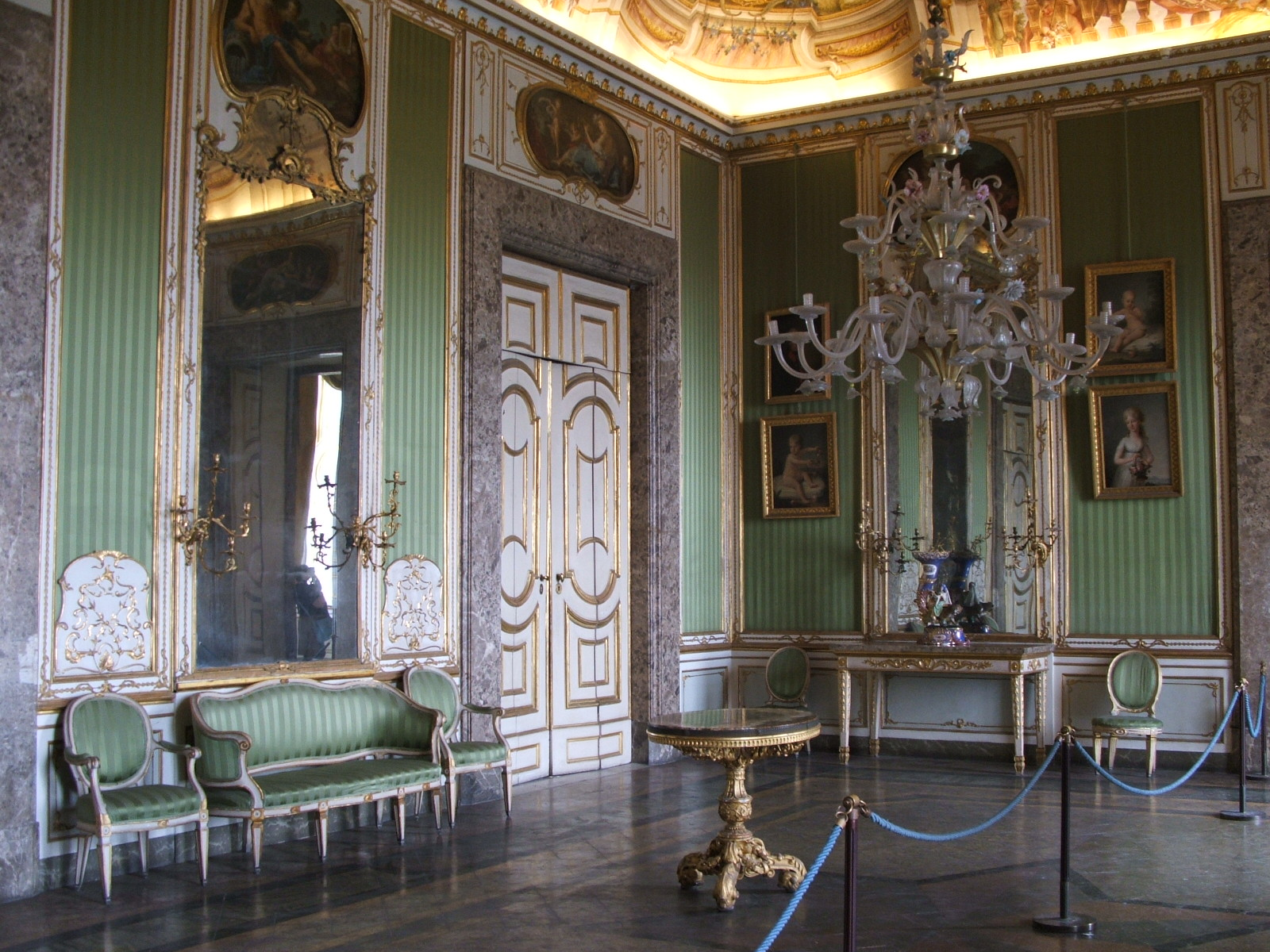
Another Rococo room in the Palace of Caserta

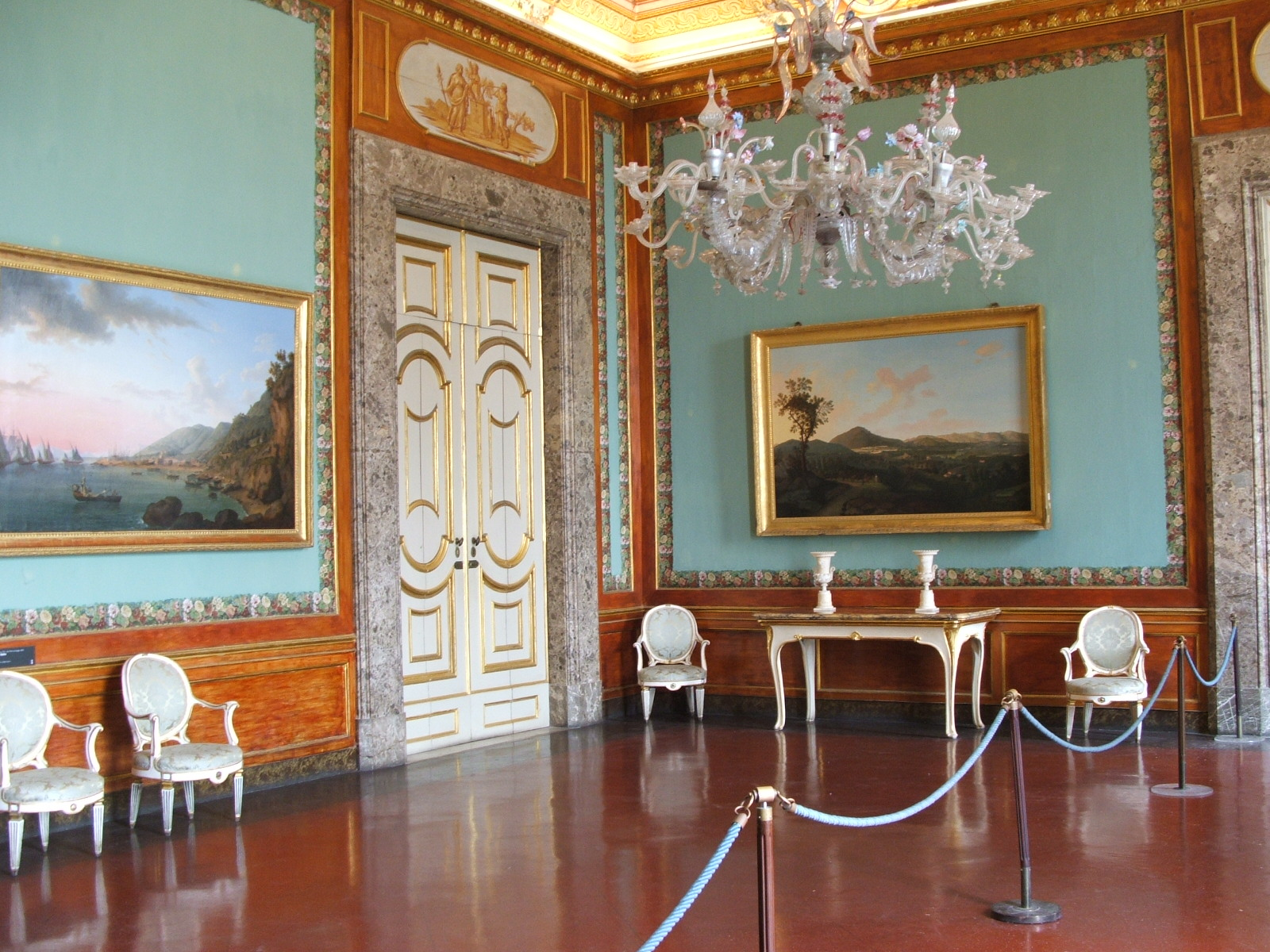
More images from the interior of the Palace of Caserta

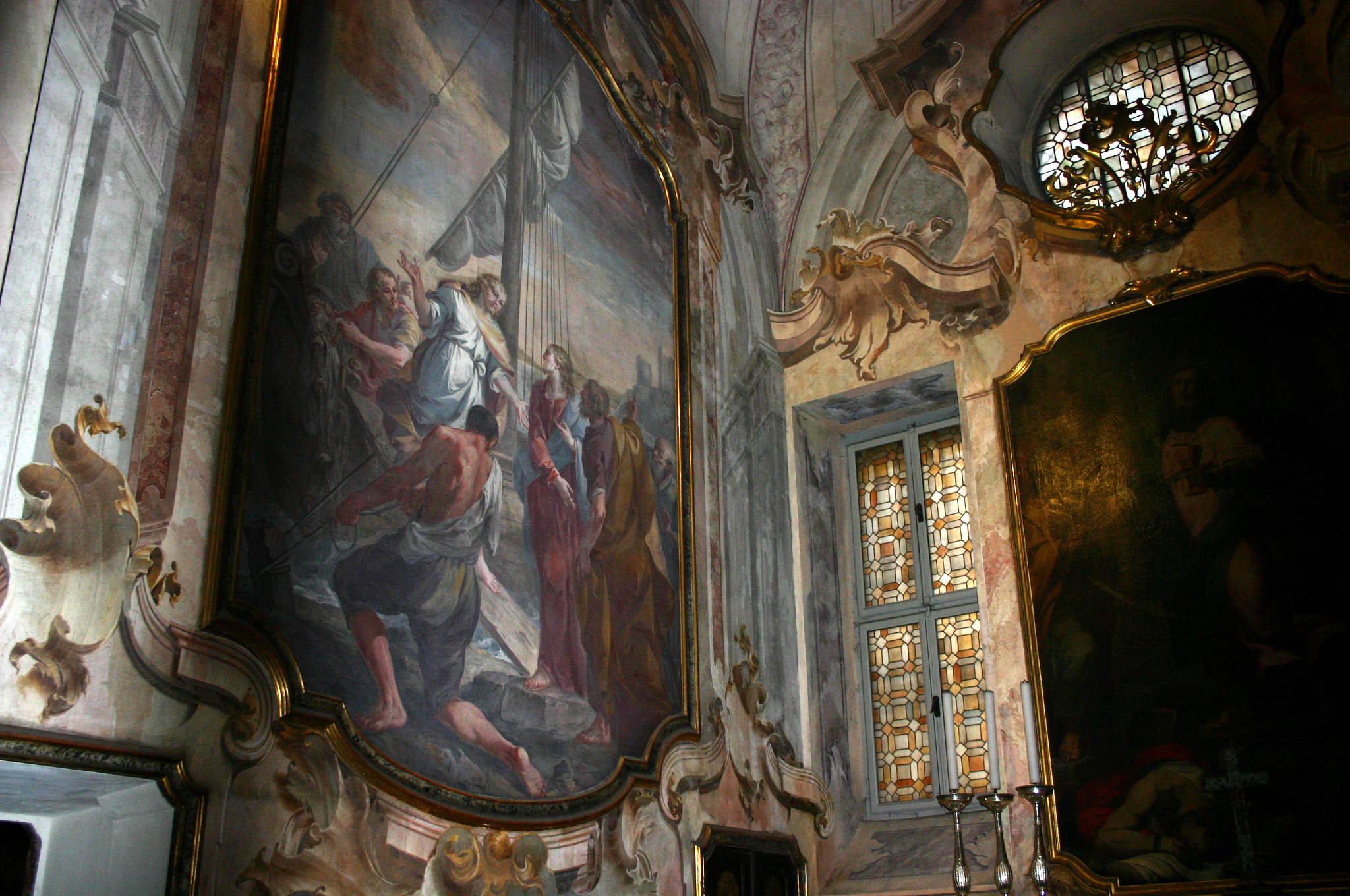
A Rococo church interior in Milan

== See also ==
- Italian Rococo art

== Bibliography ==
- Miller, Judith (2005). Furniture: world styles from classical to contemporary. DK Publishing. ISBN 0-7566-1340-X.
