= Giovanni Antonio Cucchi =

Italian painter

18th-century portrait of Giovanni Antonio Cucchi (Pinacoteca Ambrosiana)

Giovanni Antonio Cucchi (Campiglia Cervo, 17 October 1690 – Milan, 24 September 1771) was an Italian painter.

== Biography ==
He was active in painting for the Sacro Monte di Varallo. He also painted for the Palazzo Brentano in Corbetta, alongside Giovanni Battista Sassi.
