= San Zeno al Foro, Brescia =

Church in Brescia, Italy

Coordinates: 45.53936°N 10.22598°E

San Zeno al Foro
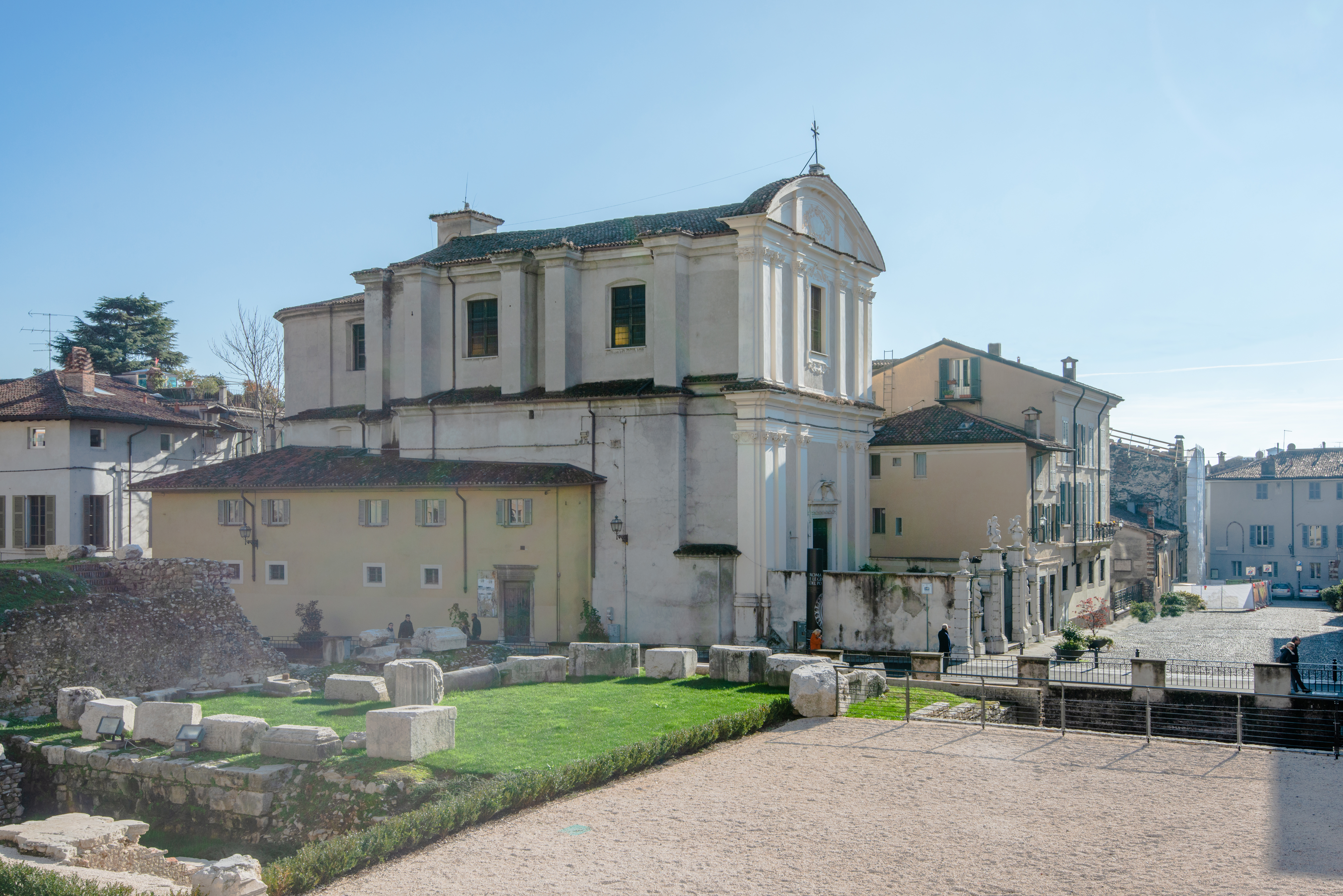

Religion
- Affiliation: Roman Catholic
- Province: Brescia

Location
- Location: Brescia, Italy
- Interactive map of San Zeno al Foro

Architecture
- Type: Church
- Style: Baroque
- Completed: 1745

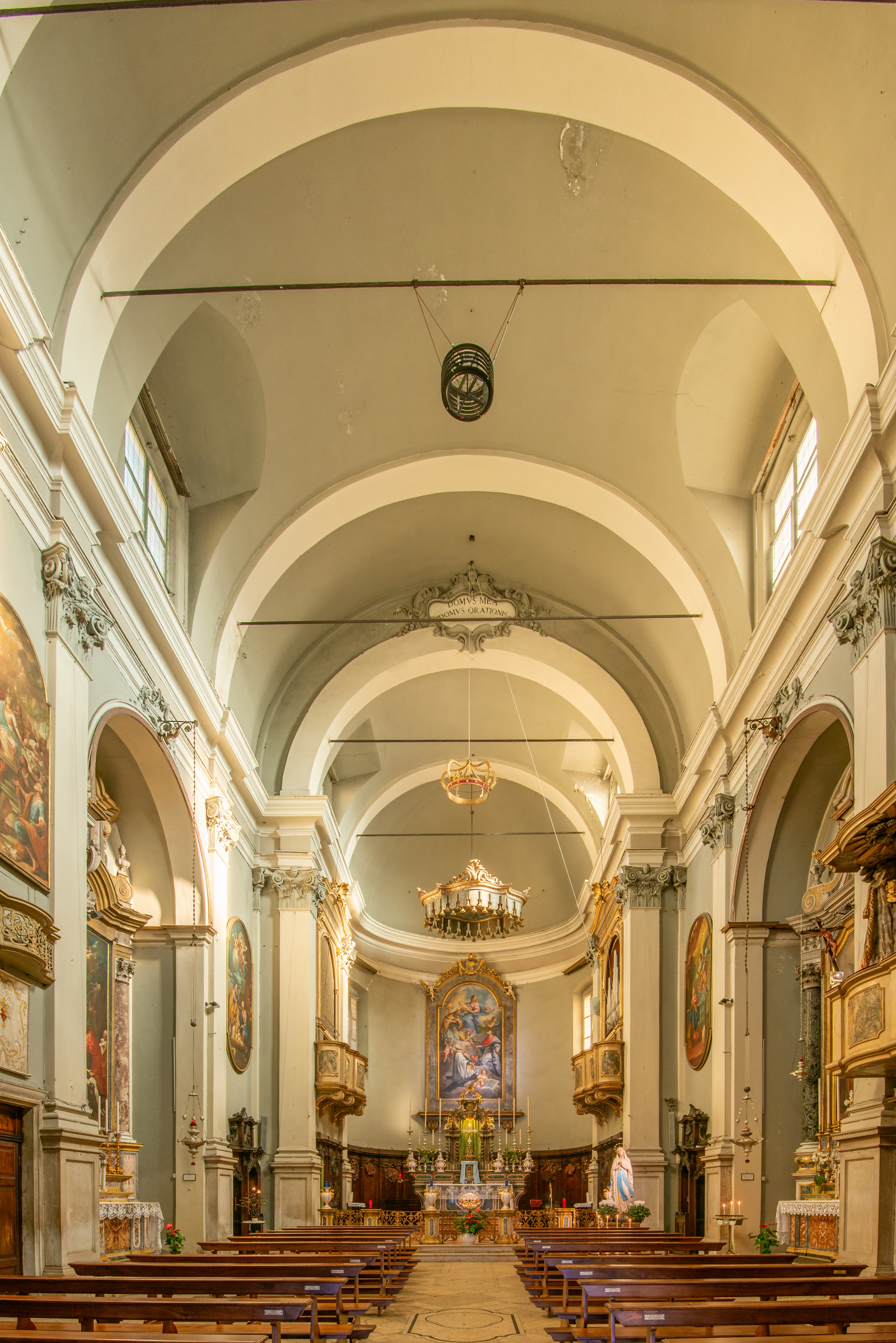
Internal view of the church

San Zeno al Foro is a church in center of the city of Brescia, situated in Piazza del Foro on the Via dei Musei, a few yards from the ruins of the Roman Capitoline temple in the city.

A church at the site had been present from the 12th century. The present Baroque structure was completed about 1745.

The interior, entrance and presbytery, is decorated by four canvases depicting Prayer in the Garden, Baptism of Christ, Annunciation, and Birth of Jesus, (1741) by Antonio Paglia. In the first altar to the right is a painting dedicated to the Sacred Heart of Jesus by Cesare Bortolotti, that in 1888 replaced an altarpiece by Paglia. The second altar on the left has a Pieta by Francesco Monti; his Death of St Anne was replaced in 1857 in the second altar on the right with a painting of the same topic by Luigi Campini . The first altar on the left dedicated to Saints Erasmo and Venanzio was painted by Giuseppe Tortelli.

The Baroque main altar is highly decorated with colored marble. The tabernacle is sculpted out of semi-precious stones, including lapis lazuli. The altarpiece was painted (1739) by Giovanni Battista Sassi. The choir stalls are carved with scenes from the life of the bishop St Zeno. The organ was built in 1877 by Tonoli.
