= Ferdinando Porta =

Italian painter

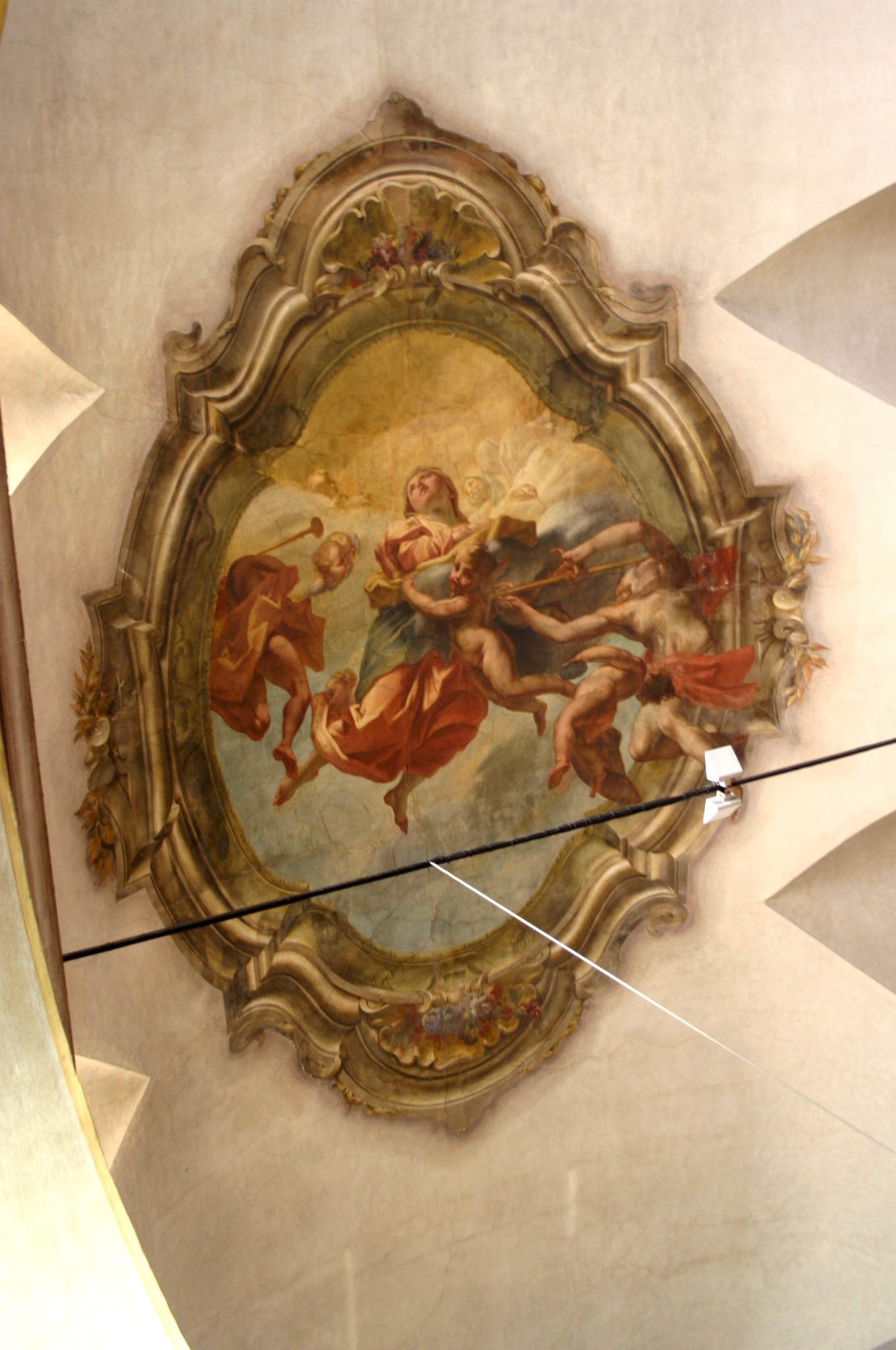
Ferdinando Porta, Assumption of Mary. Milan, Santa Maria al Paradiso.

Ferdinando Porta (1689–1767) was an Italian painter of the late-Baroque. Born in Milan. The engraver Francesco Londonio was one of his pupils. He painted frescoes in the Palazzo Brentano, Corbetta.
