= Santi Clemente e Imerio, Cremona =

17th-century Italian church

Coordinates: 45°07′51″N 10°01′37″E

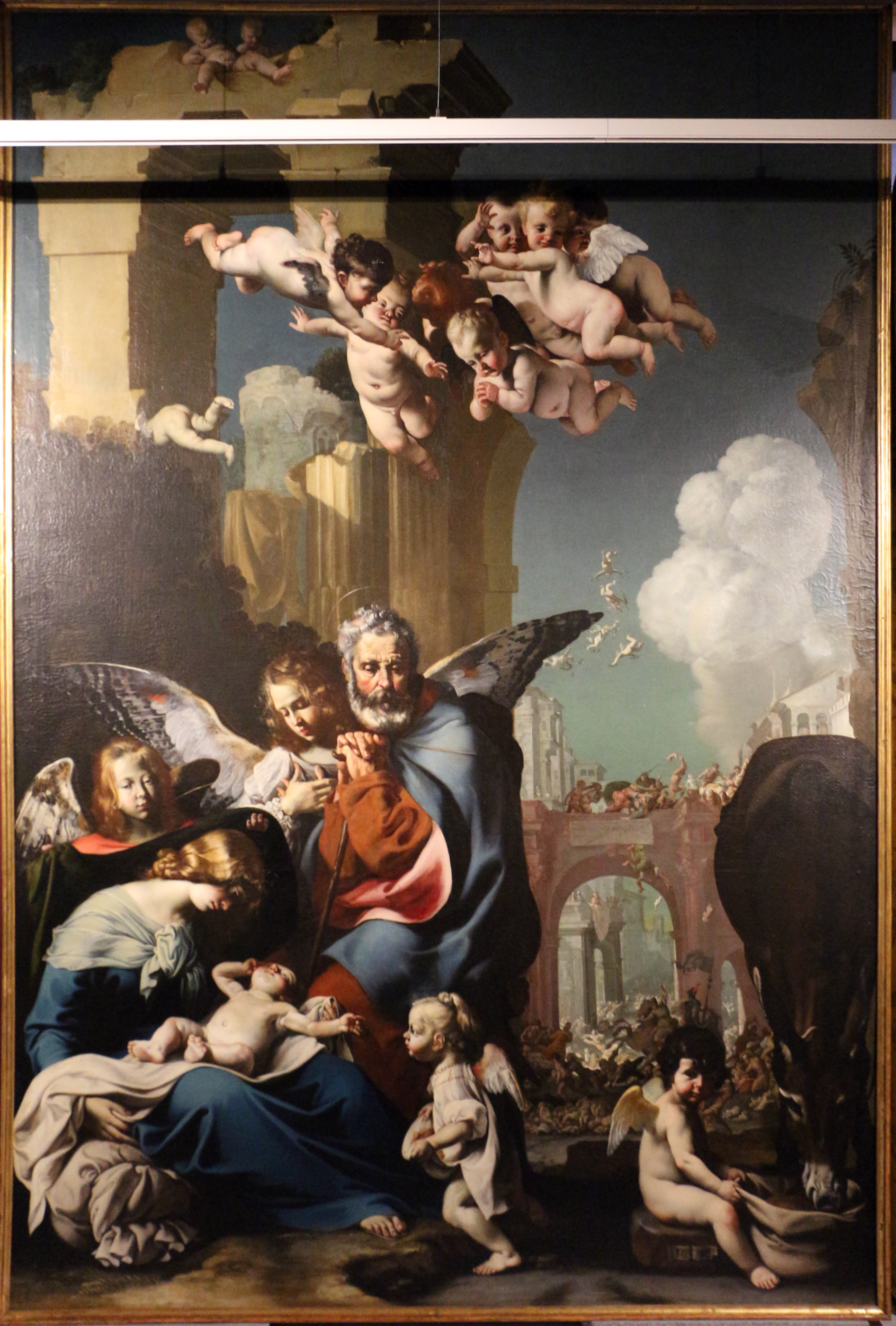

Santi Clemente e Imerio (or sometimes called Sant'Imerio alone) is a 17th-century Roman Catholic church on Via Aporti 16, in Cremona, region of Lombardy, Italy.

The church was commissioned in 1606 by the Marchese Cesare de Soresina Vidoni, in part to house his brother Pietro, who had become a monk in the Order of Discalced Carmelites, and established a convent alongside this church. The exterior was left unfinished in part to demonstrate the vows of poverty of the order. In 1805, the order was suppressed and the remaining monks were relocated to Lodi and Crema. This church was joined to the parish church of San Clemente, thus adding the name.

The church has three chapels on each side. The semi-Corinthian columns are odd, since they end in laurel, and not acanthus, leaves. The main altarpiece once held a painting depicting the Virgin and child with St Bishop Imerio and St Jerome, by Luigi Miradori. He also painted a canvas with Saints of the Carmelite order. The main altarpiece is now a Virgin and Child by Margherita Caffi.

The first chapel altarpiece on the right depicts the Virgin and Child with St. Anthony (1687) by Giovanni Battista Natali. The third chapel has Rest on the Flight to Egypt by Luigi Miradori (known as il Genovesino). In the first chapel on the left is an altarpiece depicting St John preaching in the Desert by Roberto De Longe, while in the third chapel there is a St Teresa in Prayer (1648) by Angelo Massarotti. Additionally, this church has two paintings moved here from the church of Santa Maria Magdalena: a Meeting of St Dominic with St Francis attributed to Gervasio Gatti, and a Beheading of St John the Baptist(1597) by Luca Cattapane.
