= San Bartolomeo, Piacenza =

Church building in Piacenza, Italy

Coordinates: 45.05649°N 9.68669°E

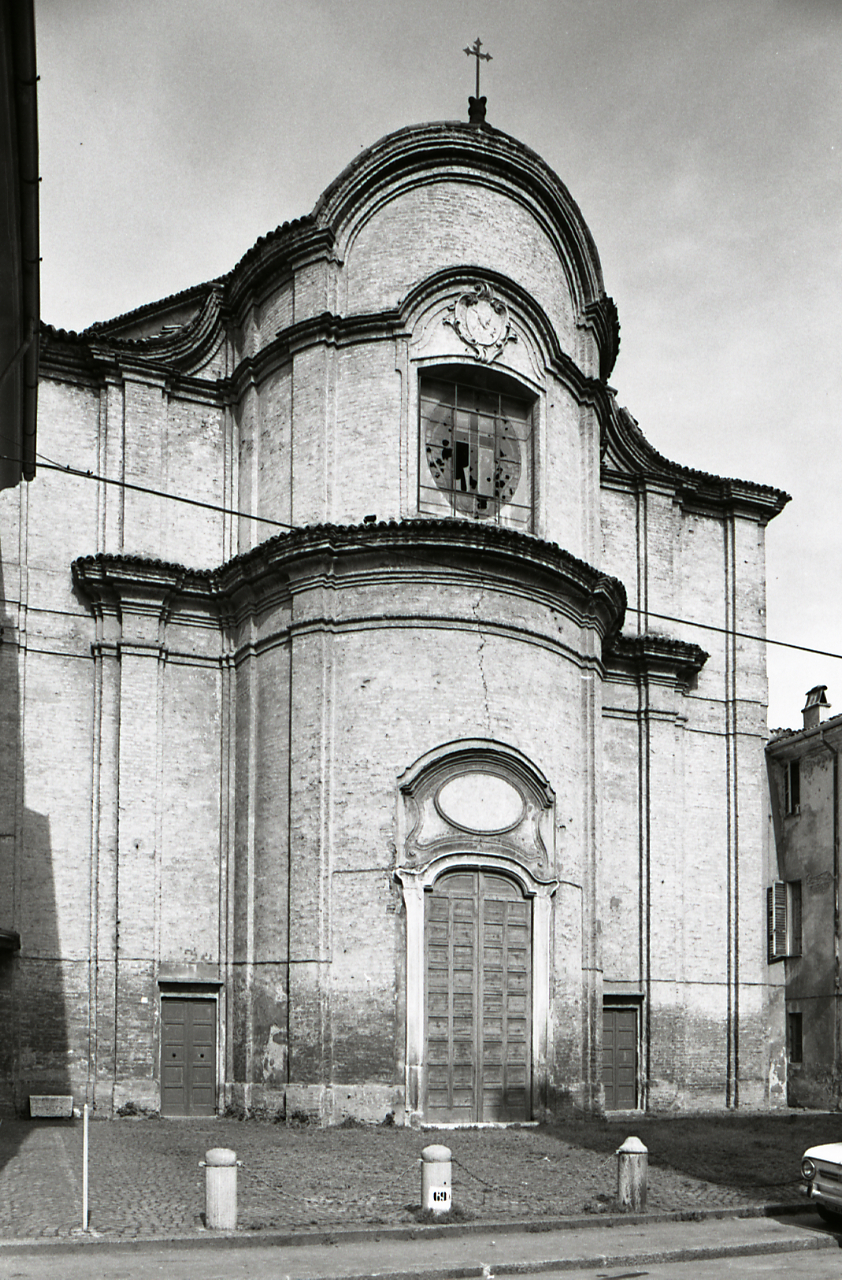

San Bartolomeo is a Baroque-style Roman Catholic church, now deconsecrated, located on 48 Via San Bartolomeo in the city of Piacenza in Italy.

This church was owned by the Gesuati (Jesuati) until 1668, when the religious order was suppressed. Some 28 years later, the church and convent was then assigned to the Augustinian Discalced Eremitani order. They refurbished the structure order, employing the architect Francesco Croce to design the present edifice, built in 1754–1763. The Augustinians remained here till the monastery was suppressed in 1805, and the church became a parish church.

An inventory from 1842 noted the first altarpiece on the right, depicting a Holy Family was painted by Roberto da Longe and Federigo Ferrari. Next to the main altar is a large 16th century altarpiece by Luca Cattapane depicting the Resurrection. In the choir, the depiction of St Anthony was painted by Carlo Francesco Nuvoloni. The painting of the Virgin and Chile with St Sigismond was painted by Giovanni Rubini. Near the altar dedicated to St Anne is a St Augustine painted by Federigo Ferrari, who also painted the medallions in the cupola, one depicting the Life of St Bartholemew.
