= Palazzo Bellisomi Vistarino =

Rococo-style palace in Pavia, Lombardy, Italy

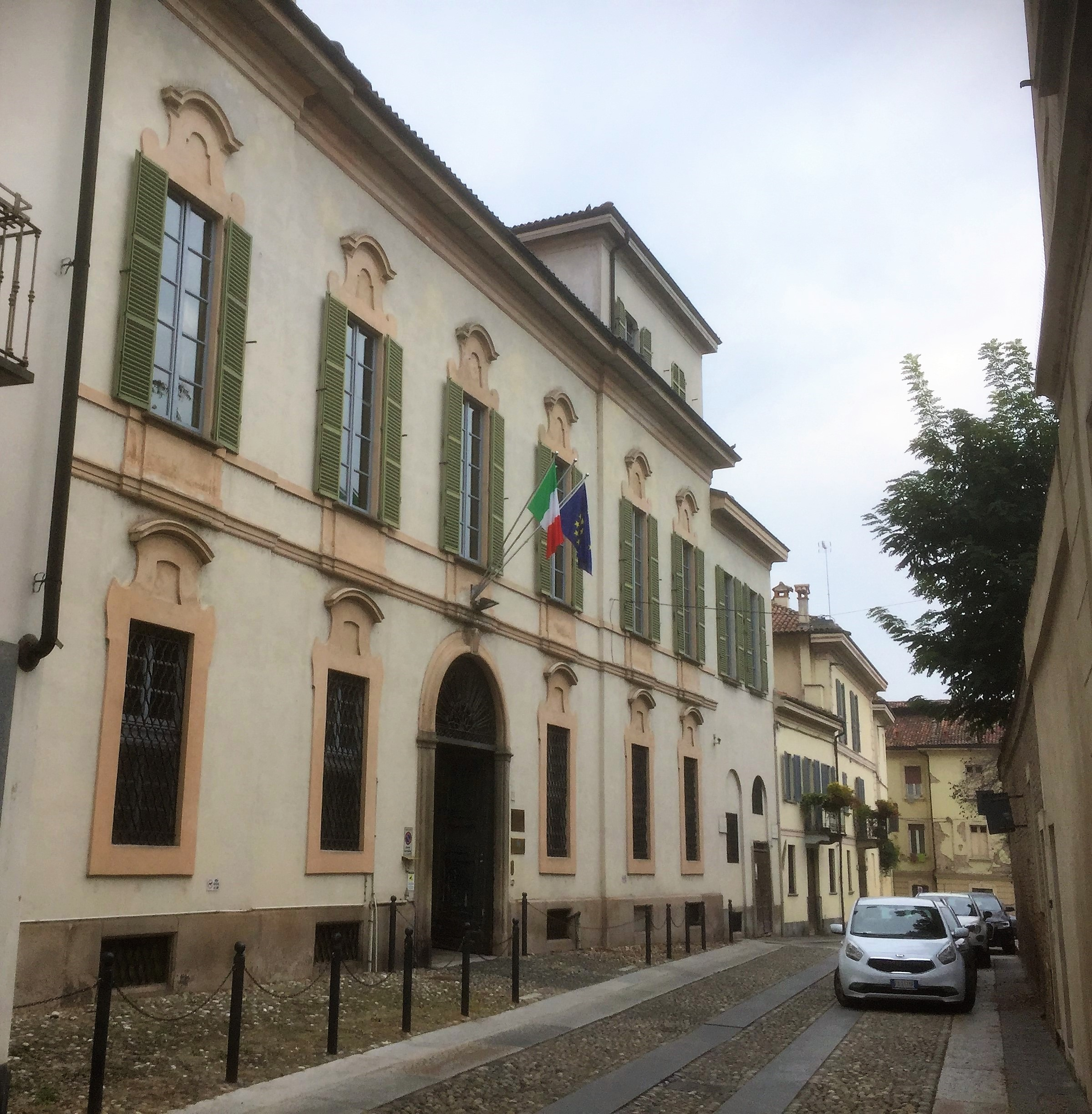
- Facade
- Interactive map of the Palazzo Bellisomi Vistarino area

General information
- Type: Palace
- Architectural style: Rococo
- Location: Pavia, Italy
- Coordinates: 45.1814°N 9.1570°E
- Opened: 1753
- Owner: University of Pavia

Design and construction
- Architect: Francesco Croce

The Palazzo Bellisomi Vistarino is an 18th-century palace in the city of Pavia and among the most important examples of Lombard rococo.

== History ==
The Bellisomi aristocratic family is of ancient Pavia origin. Jurists, administrators, ecclesiastics emerged, among these the most famous was Carlo (1736-1808), who went through a diplomatic career, first becoming nuncio to Poland and then to Lisbon, in 1783 he was created cardinal, and in 1795 bishop of Cesena. He actively participated in the Consulte de Lyon in 1801. The Bellisomi family moved to this noble house in the parish of Santa Maria Corte Cremona (where the palace is located) between 1610 and 1619, when Nicola Annibale, first Marquis of Frascarolo, leaves the nearby house in the parish of San Michele where the family resided since the fifteenth century.

Around 1720 the aristocratic family decided to remodel their urban palace according to the dictates of the new artistic fashions, the works, however, lasted for a long time, until, from 1745, Gaetano Annibale Bellisomi, thanks to the huge accumulated patrimony, gave new impetus to the construction site. Gaetano Annibale was a man of great culture and multifaceted interests, from the sciences to the arts, a passionate bibliophile (the Bellisomi library was one of the largest in the city) and a great collector of antiquities, especially ancient coins. In the palace he created an antiquarian museum, also rich in naturalistic collections, which also attracted visitors from other Italian cities and beyond.

The palace was designed by Francesco Croce, one of the greatest Milanese architects of the time, while the Cremonese painter Giovanni Angelo Borroni was called on for the frescoes. With the death of Gaetano Annibale Bellisomi, in 1747, the renovation of the building was carried out by his wife, Marie Anne Thérèse de la Corcelle Percy, and the works were completed in 1753. The elegant building was originally richly furnished, we know in fact that Gaetano Annibale brought furniture from France and, through the Marquis Antoniotto Botta Adorno (high officer of the Habsburg monarchy and a plenipotentiary of the Austrian Netherlands), Flemish tapestries from Brussels. In the 19th century the ownership of the building passed to the Giorgi di Vistarino counts, who remodeled the decorations of some rooms according to the taste of the time. After several passages, the building became the property of the University of Pavia, which after extensive renovations, which began in 2007, has been the headquarters of the Alma Mater Ticinensis foundation since 2013.

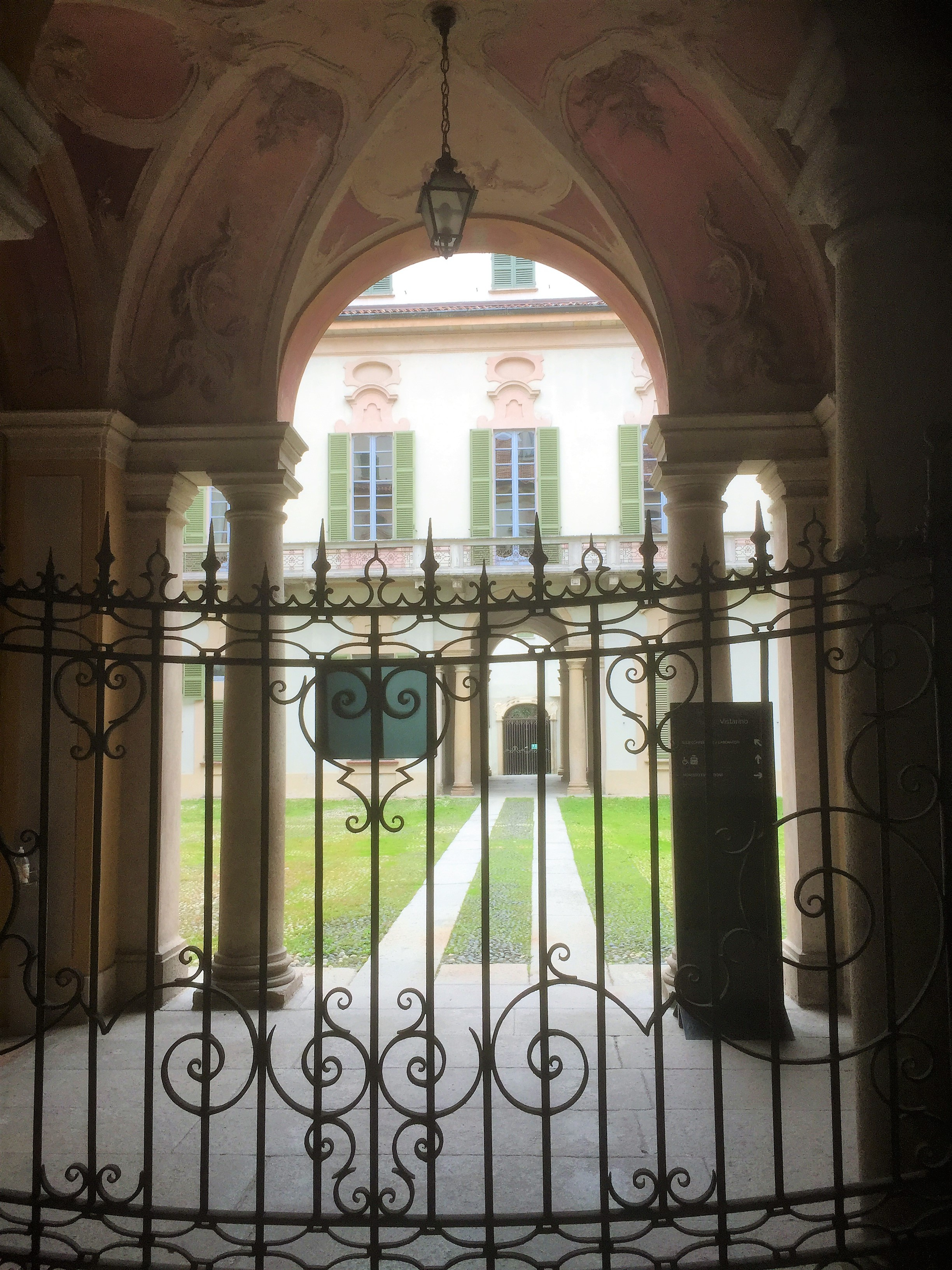
The first courtyard of the palace.

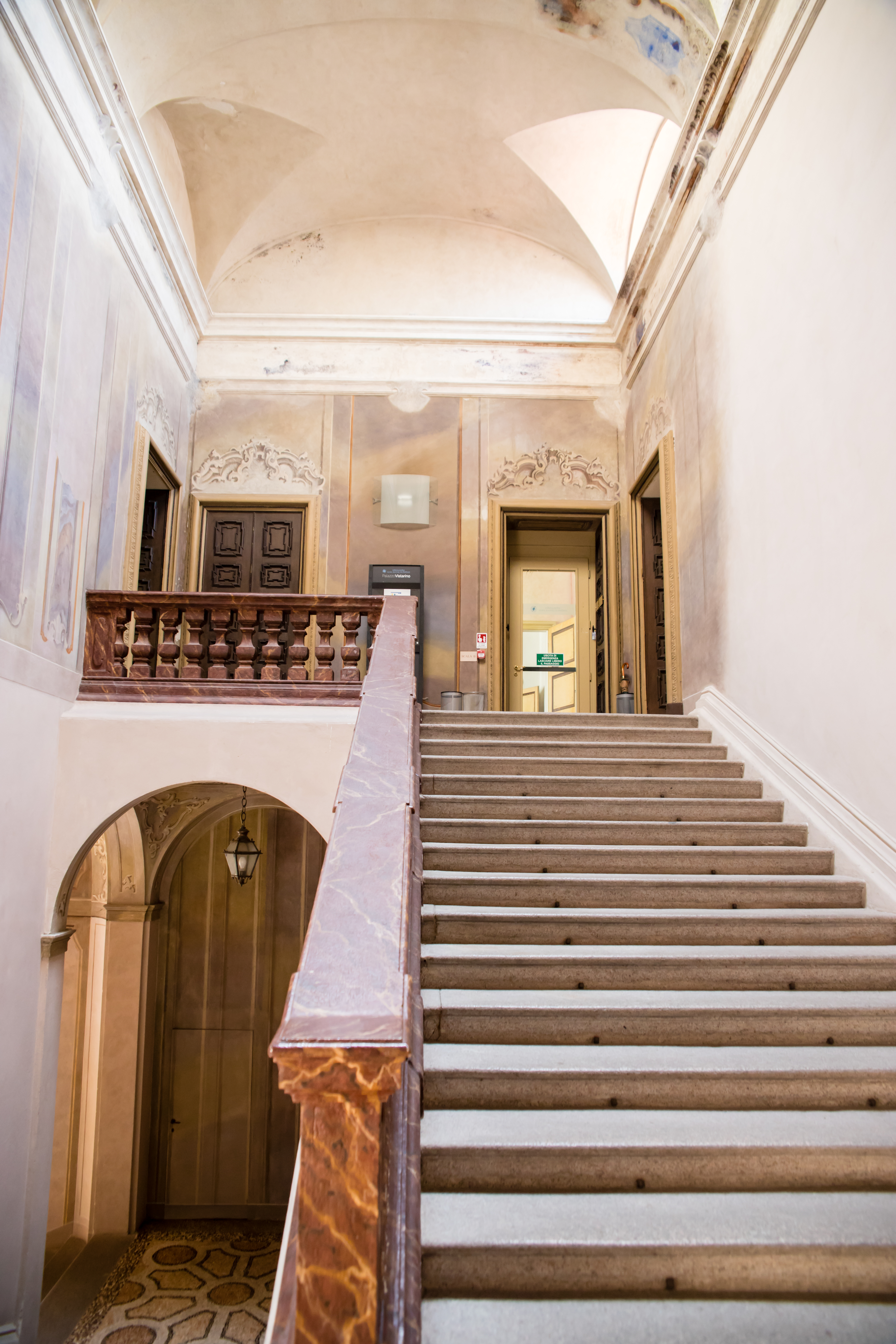
The grand staircase.

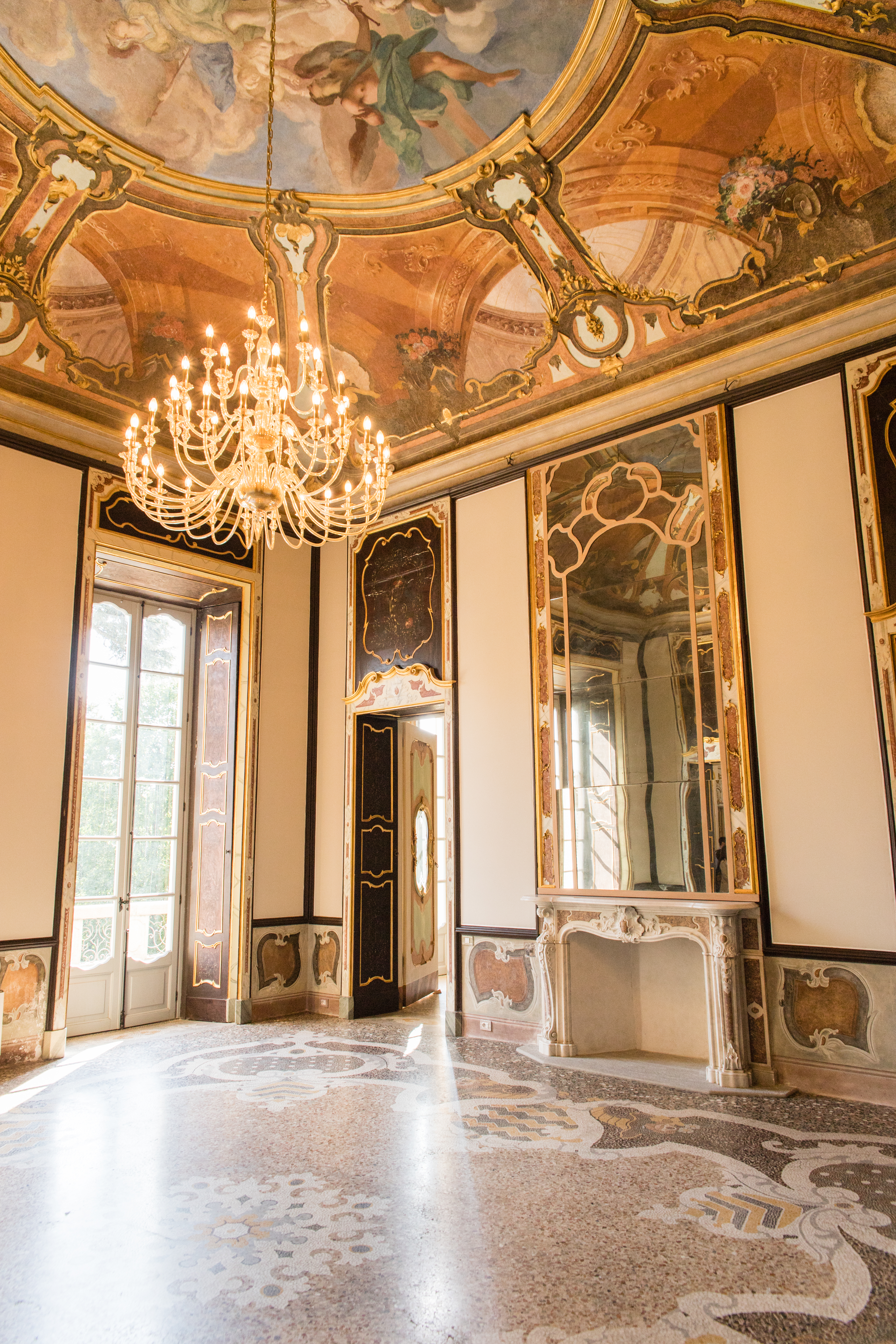
One of the internal rooms with frescoes by Giovanni Angelo Borroni.

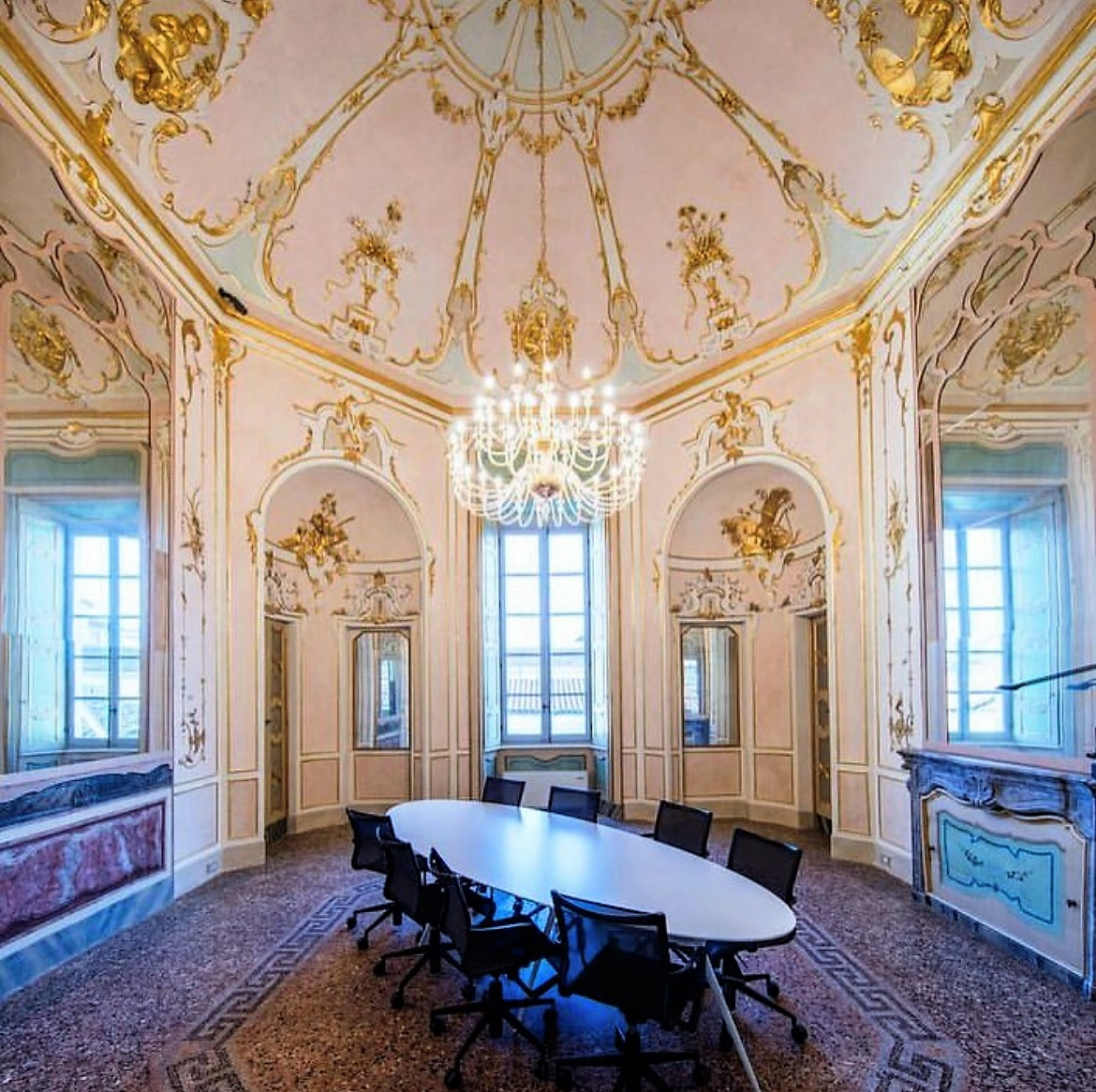
Pink room.

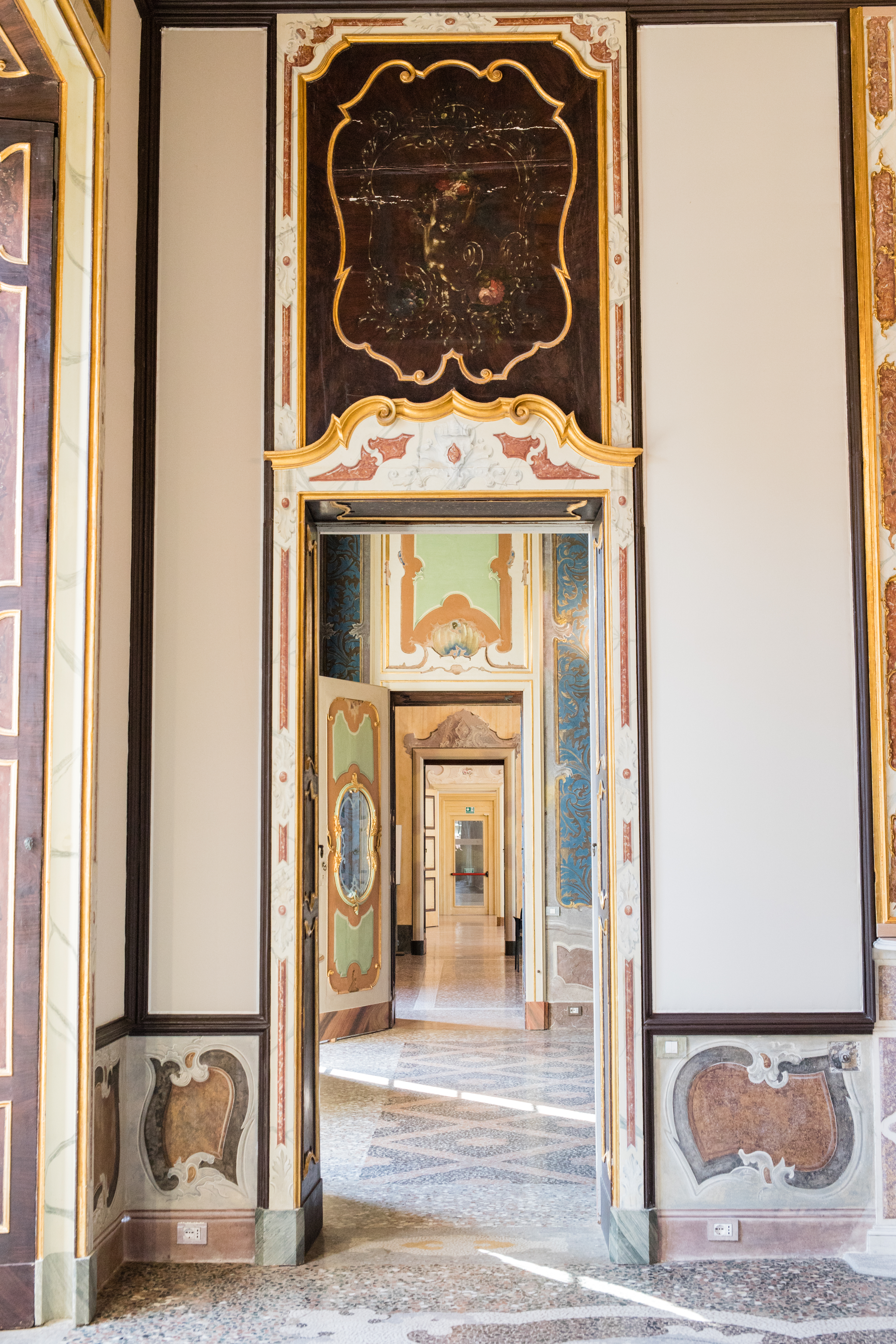
One of the corridors.

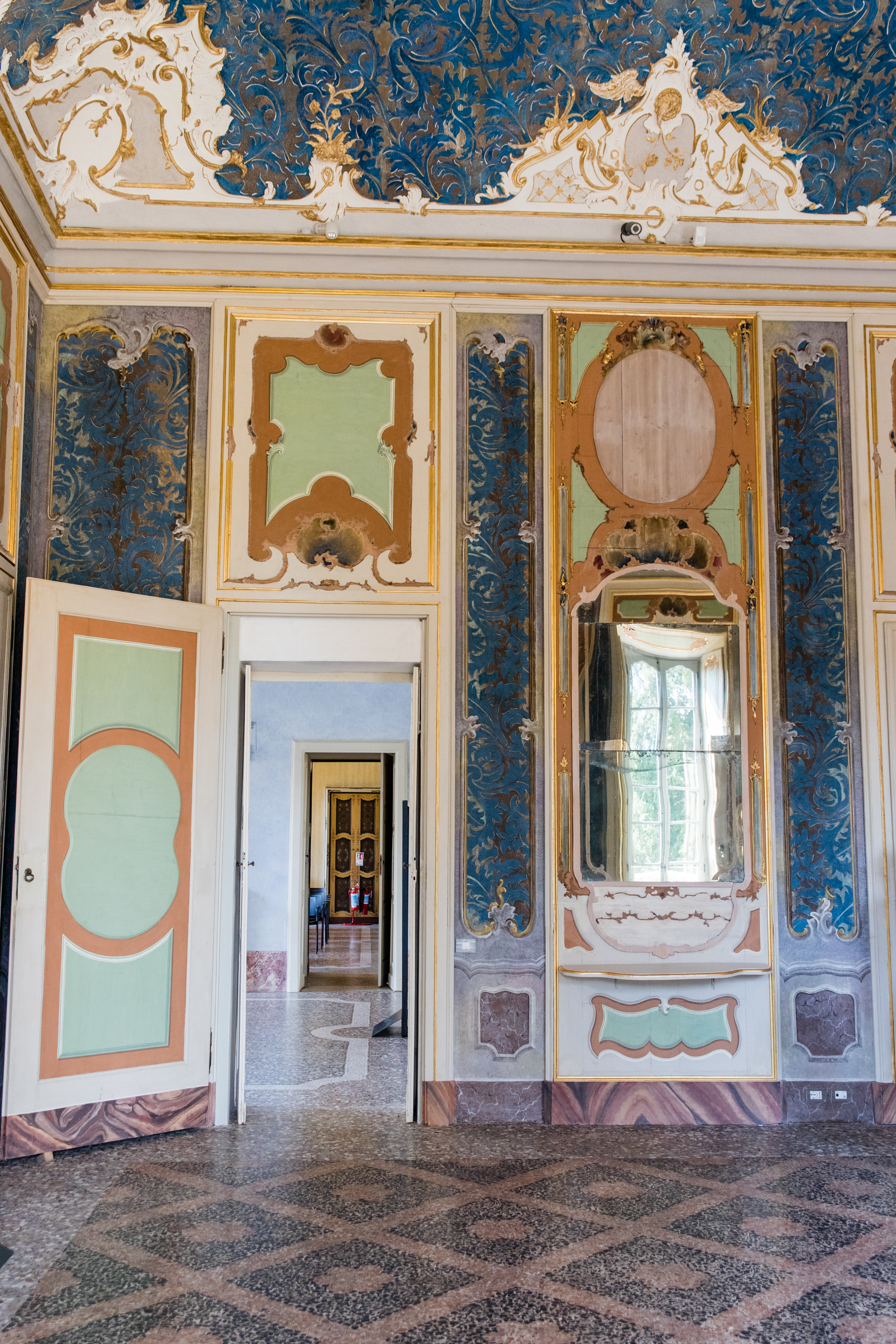
Blue room.

== Architecture ==
The complex, which occupies an area of no less than 5,600 m^{2}, is organized around the noble court, the service court and the large garden, which overlooks the Ticino from a belvedere.

The building also has a chapel, dedicated to Saints Simon and Judas, and stables. The stables, located in a side wing of the building, away from the residential areas, are divided by a double row of tall granite columns and are covered with domes. At the stables there is a room where the family carriages were originally parked. A staircase allows access to the various rooms of the main wing of the building, which are then connected to the intermediate wings.

The building is also characterized by the diversity of the two facades: simple and rational the one facing via Sant'Ennodio, scenographic and lively, thanks also to the porch and terrace, the one facing the garden.

Francesco Croce designed the building in such a way that the whole complex seemed to have arisen on the same level, but in reality the northern part of the building, the first courtyard and the part facing the Ticino to the south have a difference in height of more than five metres.
