= Palazzo Brentano, Corbetta =

Coordinates: 45.466394°N 8.917178°E

Palazzo Brentano
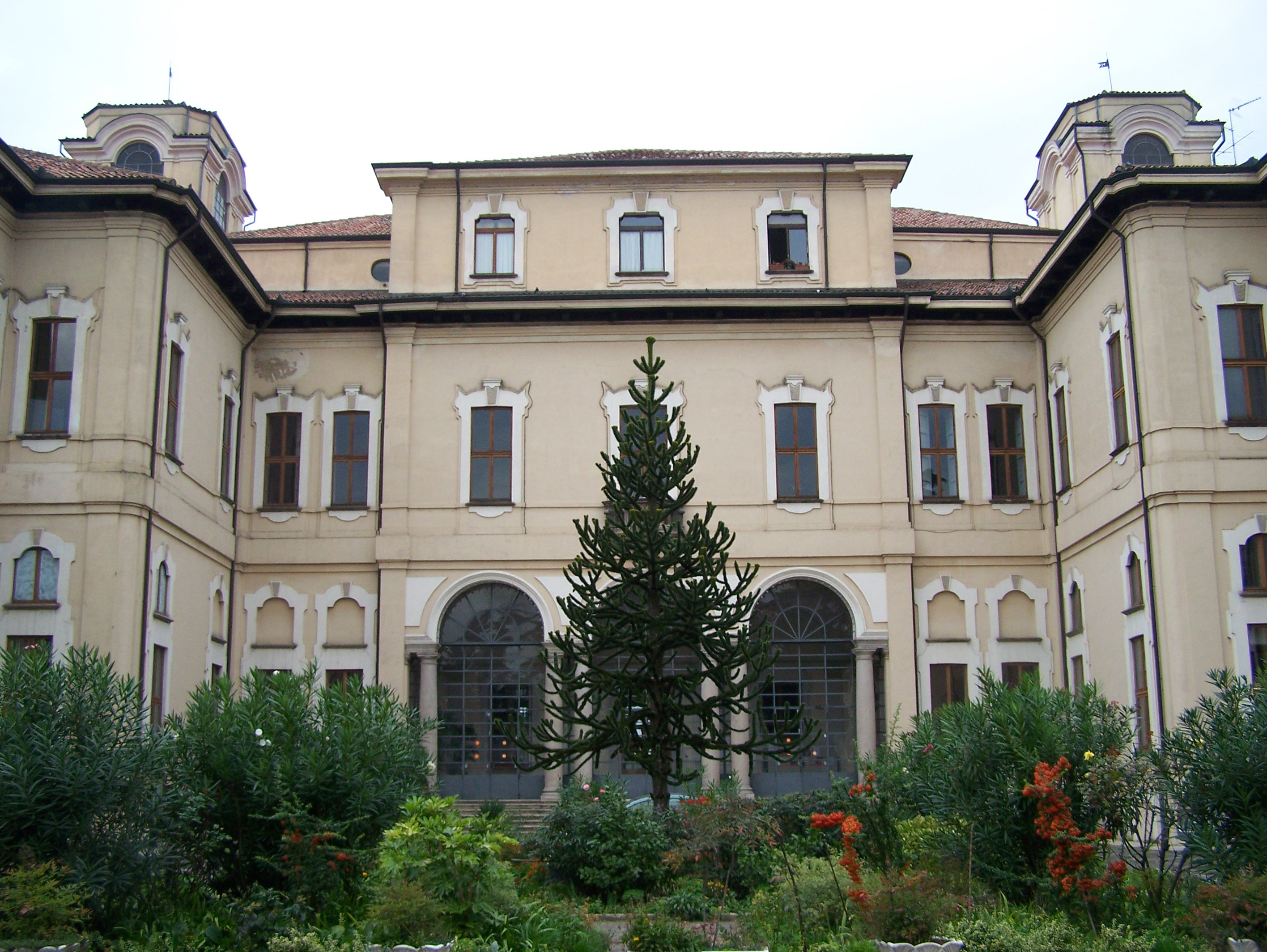
- Facade
- Interactive map of the Palazzo Brentano area

General information
- Architectural style: late-Baroque architecture
- Location: Vicolo del Ghiaccio 2-8, Corbetta, Italy
- Construction started: 1730

Design and construction
- Architect: Francesco Croce

The Palazzo Brentano is a late Baroque palace on Vicolo del Ghiaccio in the town of Corbetta located in the Metropolitan City of Milan in the Italian region of Lombardy.

The present larger palace at the site was designed by Francesco Croce. It was commissioned by Giuseppe Brentano, who had been made by the Austrian authorities, the Count of Caltignaga in 1715. A smaller but noble house had been owned by the Marquis Ferrante Villani Novati, and the property sold to Count Brentani in 1731. To enhance the prestige of this newly-minted aristocrat, he commissioned this more grandiose villa in the 1730s, and decoration continued until 1750, employing a number of artists who had been employed in the decoration of Palazzo Casati Dugnani and Palazzo Clerici in Milan, including Giovanni Antonio Cucchi (who painted the Apotheosis of Hercules in the central hall); Giovanni Angelo Borroni and Mattia Bortoloni; Ferdinando Porta (who painted the Marriage of Cupid and Psyche in the main hall); and Giovanni Battista Sassi.

The Brentano family sold the palace in 1839. After a series of owners, the palace came to be property of tha Somaschi order in 1935. First a seminary, the palace now functions as a children's school.
