= Villa Pertusati, Comazzo =

Coordinates: 45°26′32″N 9°28′02″E

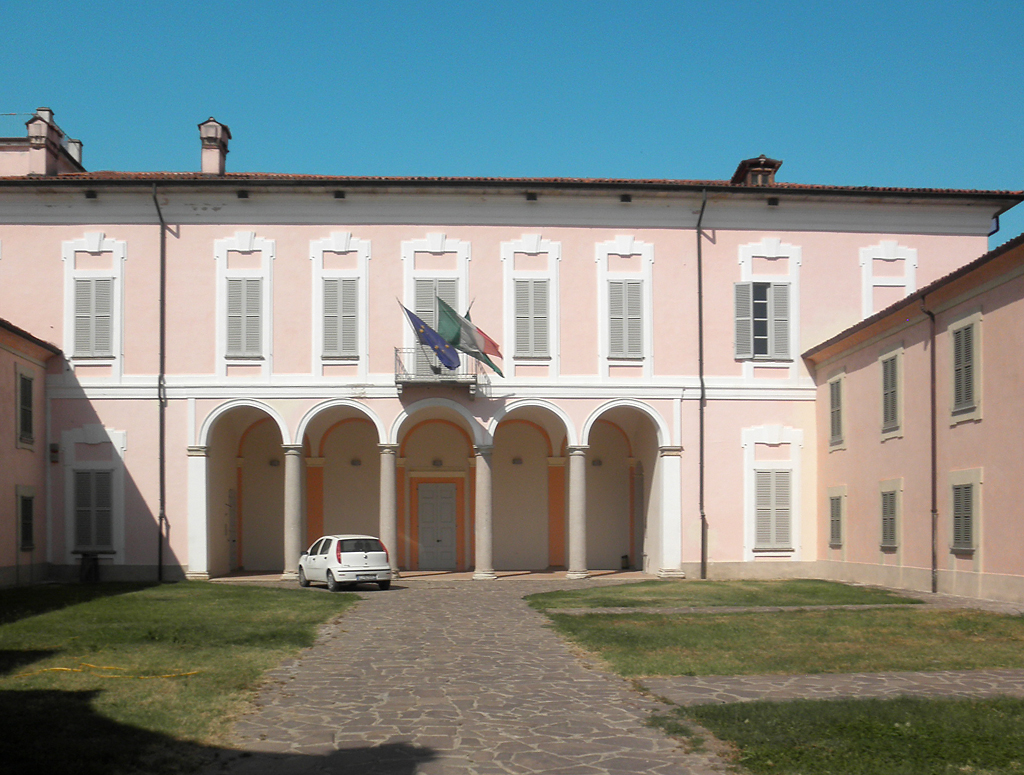
Facade of Villa Pertusati

The Villa Pertusati is an 18th-century rural palace located inside the town of Comazzo, Province of Lodi, Lombardy, Italy.

== History ==
The villa was designed prior to 1747 by the architect Francesco Croce, while the gardens and fountains were designed by Carlo Croce

After many owners, in the 19th century it became the city hall (municipal office) of the town.
