= Benedetto Alfieri =

Italian architect

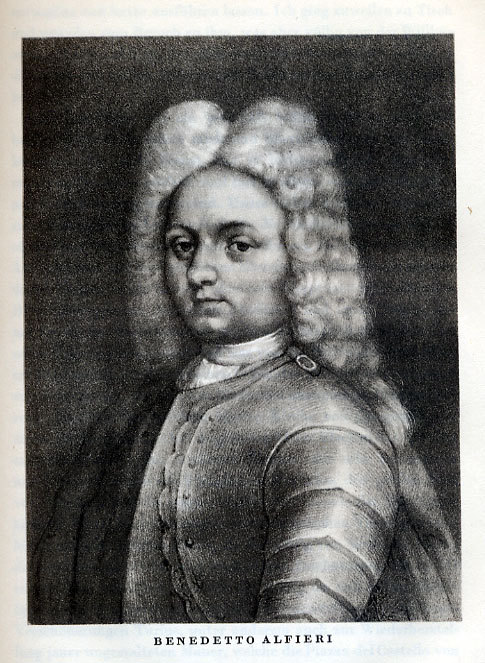
Benedetto Alfieri from the treatise of "Leben des Vittorio Alfieri"

Benedetto Innocenzo Alfieri (8 June 1699 - 9 December 1767) was an Italian architect, a representative of the late-Baroque or Rococo style.

== Biography and works ==
Born in Rome, he was the godson of Pope Innocent XII, and a member of the notable Alfieri family of Piedmontese origin (the well-known dramatist Vittorio Alfieri was his nephew). In Rome, Benedetto was educated in mathematics and design by the Jesuits; he then moved to Piedmont (living in Turin and Asti) to practice both as a lawyer and as an architect. He was frequently patronized by Charles Emmanuel III of Sardinia, who commissioned him with the design of the Royal Theater of Turin; the theatre (which was probably his masterwork) burned down in 1936 and reopened in 1973.

He also completed the bell tower of the Church of Santa Anna in Asti; designed the Palazzo Ghilini in Alessandria; helped complete the façade of the Vercelli Cathedral (1757–1763); aided in the decoration of the interior of the Basilica of Corpus Domini in Turin and the decoration of Palazzo Chiablese, adjacent to the Royal Palace in Turin. He also contributed additions and extensive decoration of the Palazzina di caccia of Stupinigi. He designed the bell tower of the Basilica of San Gaudenzio in Novara. He also completed the neoclassical façade of Saint Pierre Cathedral in Geneva. The King made him Count of Sostegno.

He collaborated during his long career with artists such as Luigi Acquisti, Giovanni Battista Borra, and Emilio Usiglio among many. He died in Turin.

== Gallery ==
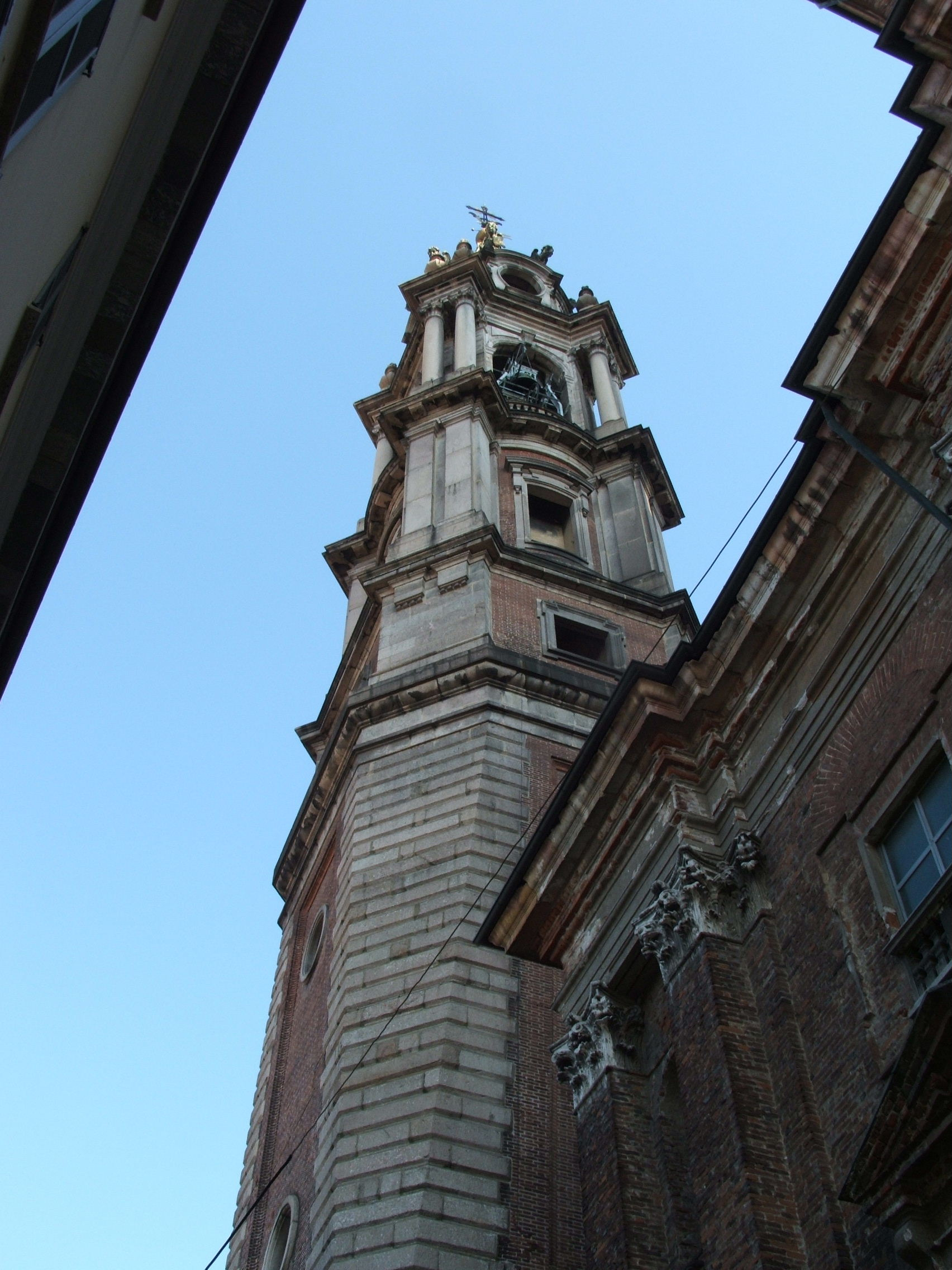
Belltower Novara

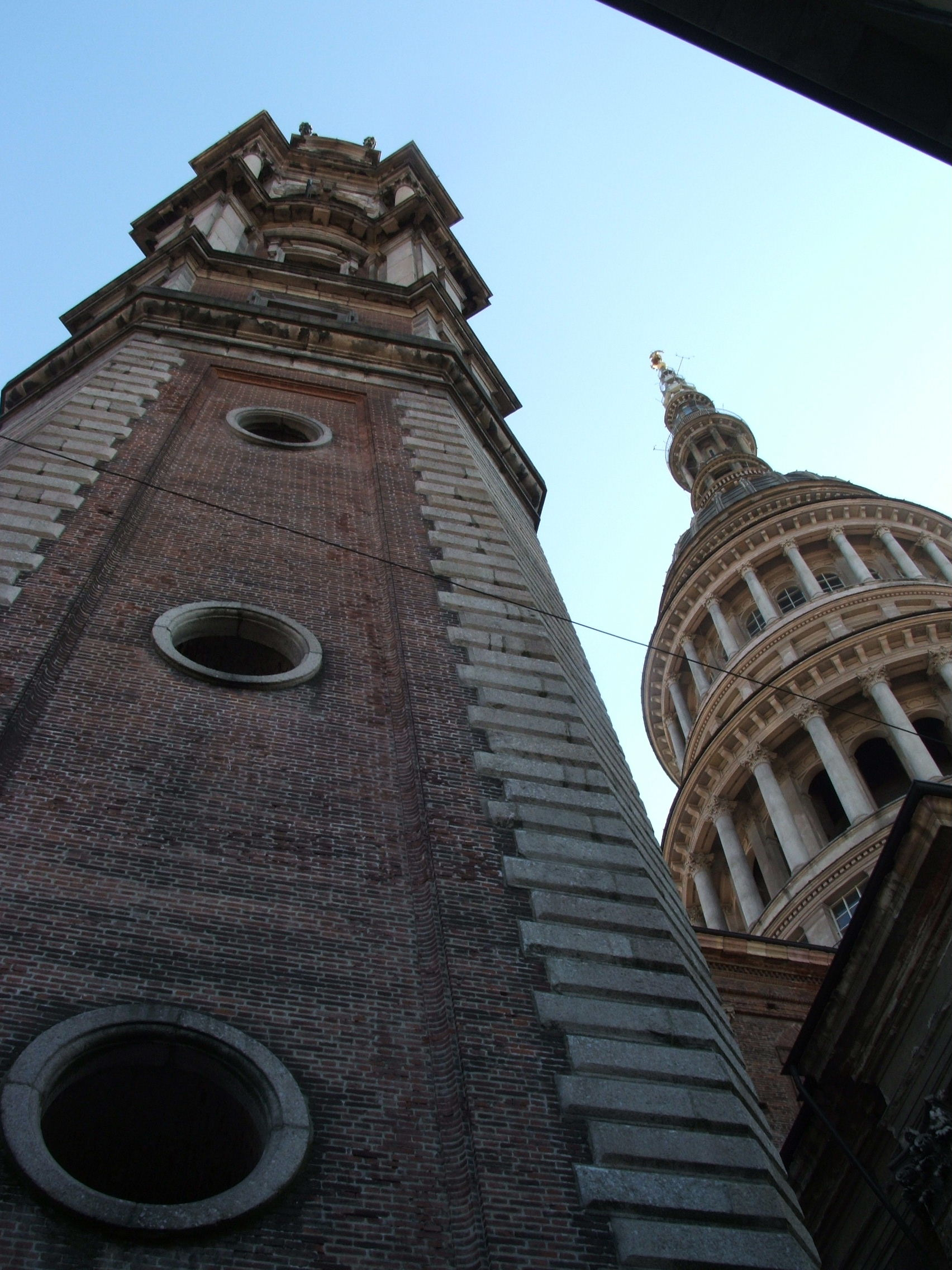
Belltower Novara

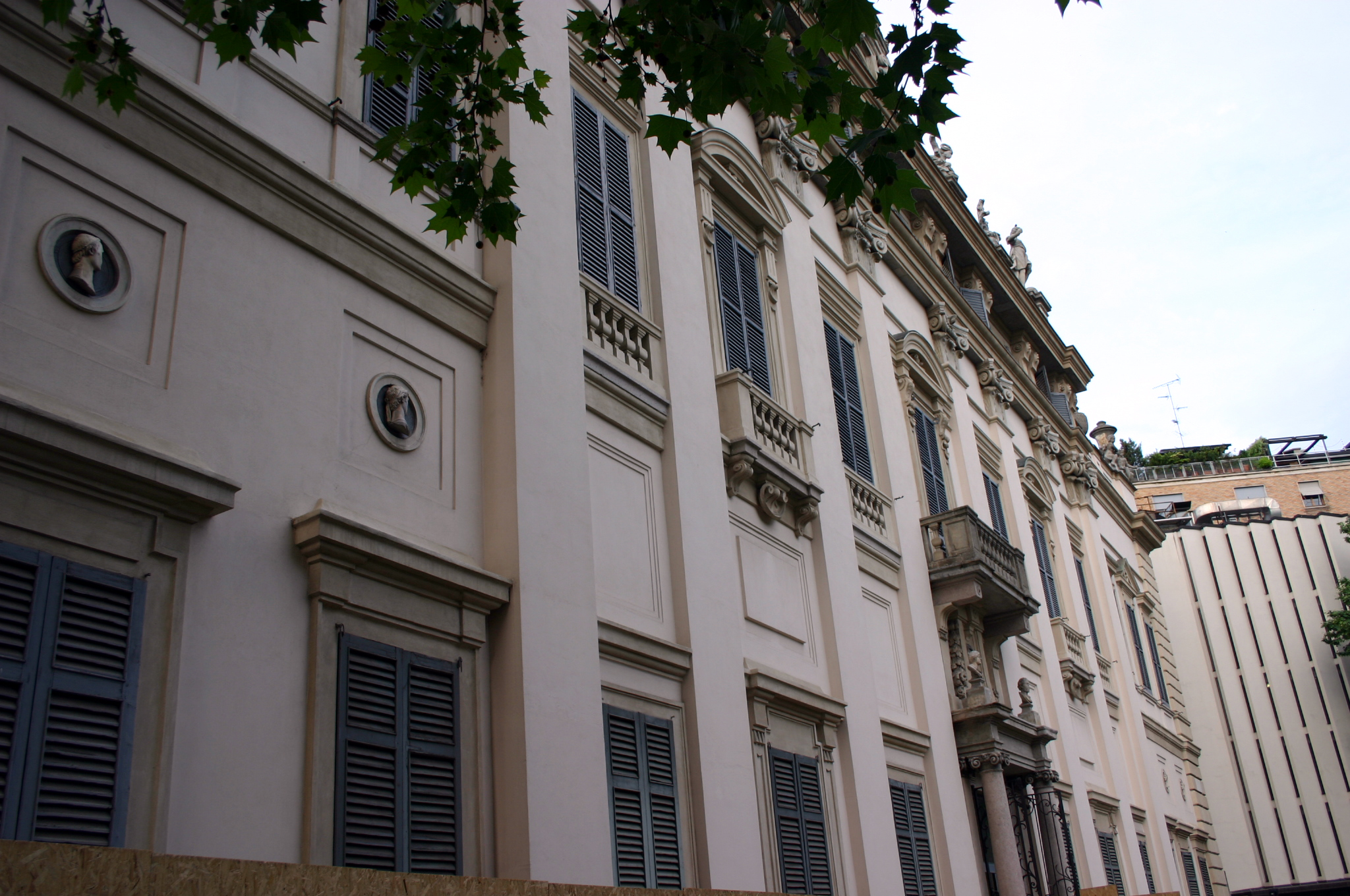
Palazzo Sormani in Milan

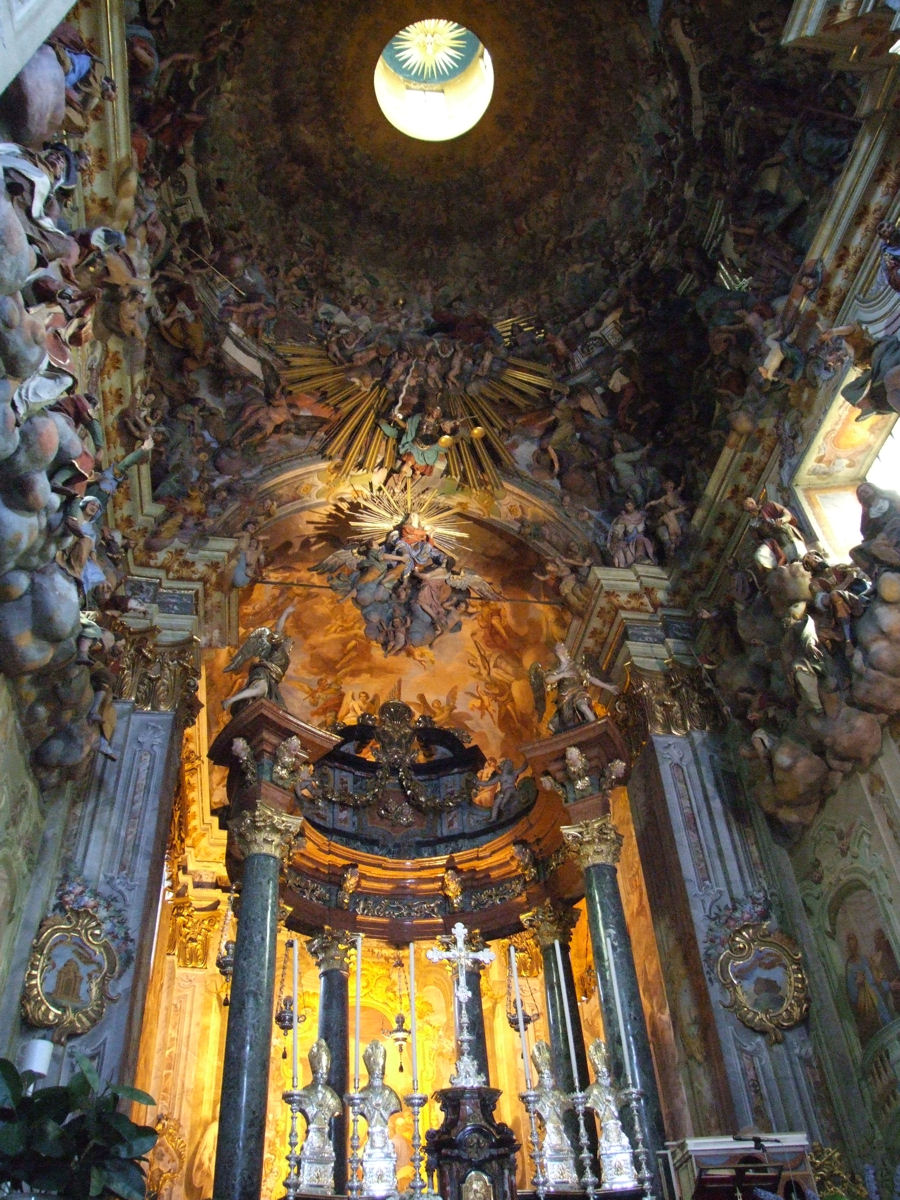
Main altar by Alfieri in Sacro Monte di Varallo

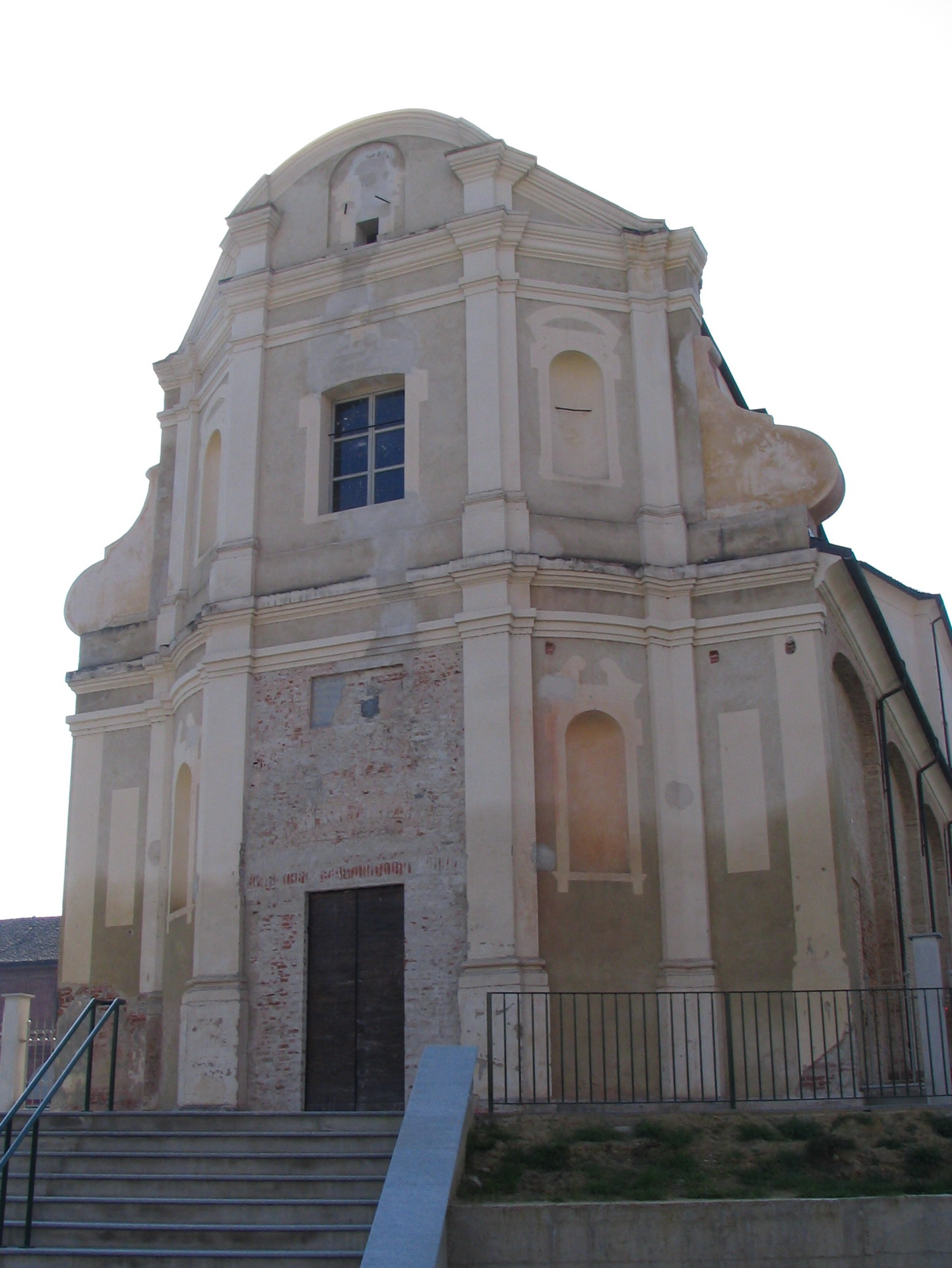
Santa Anna, Asti

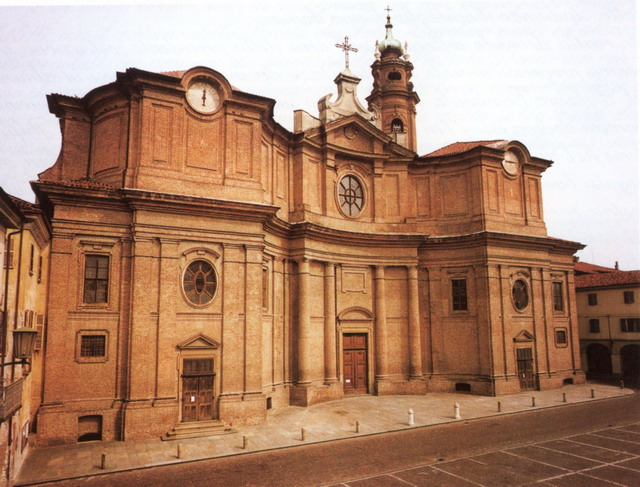
Duomo of Carignano (1756–1766)

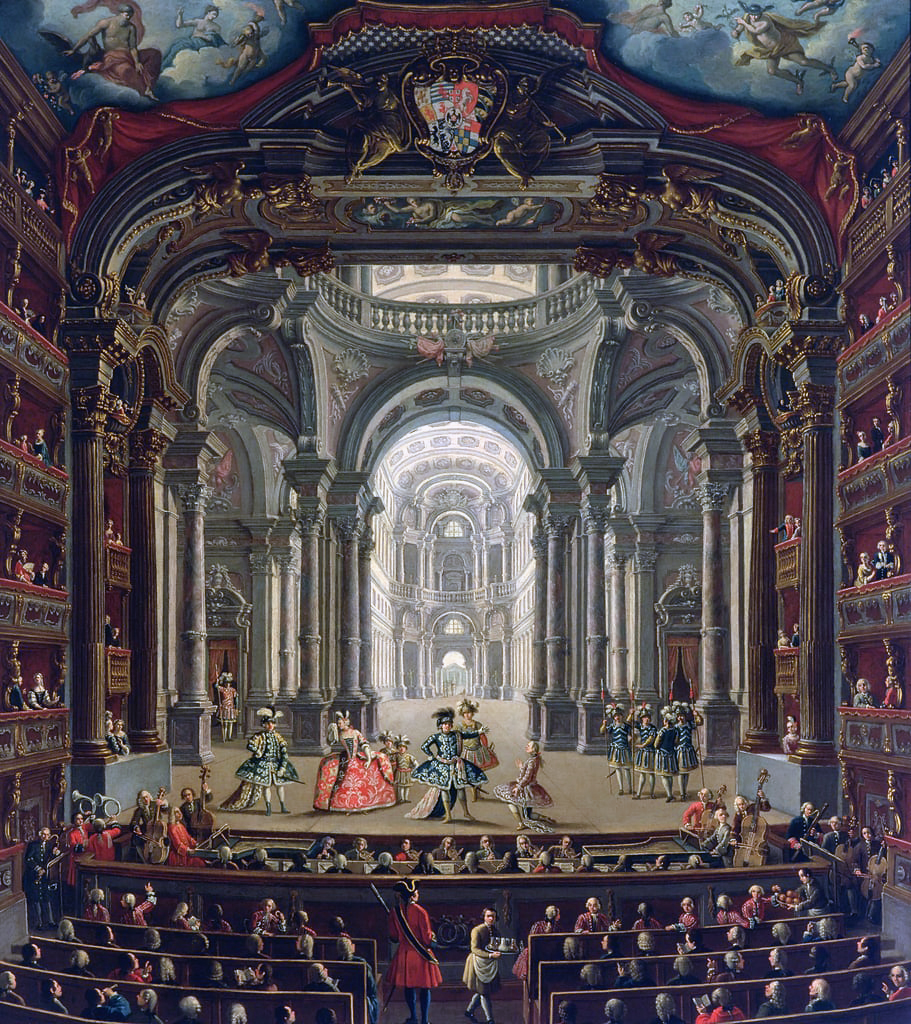
Interior of Teatro Regio, painted by Pietro Domenico Oliviero

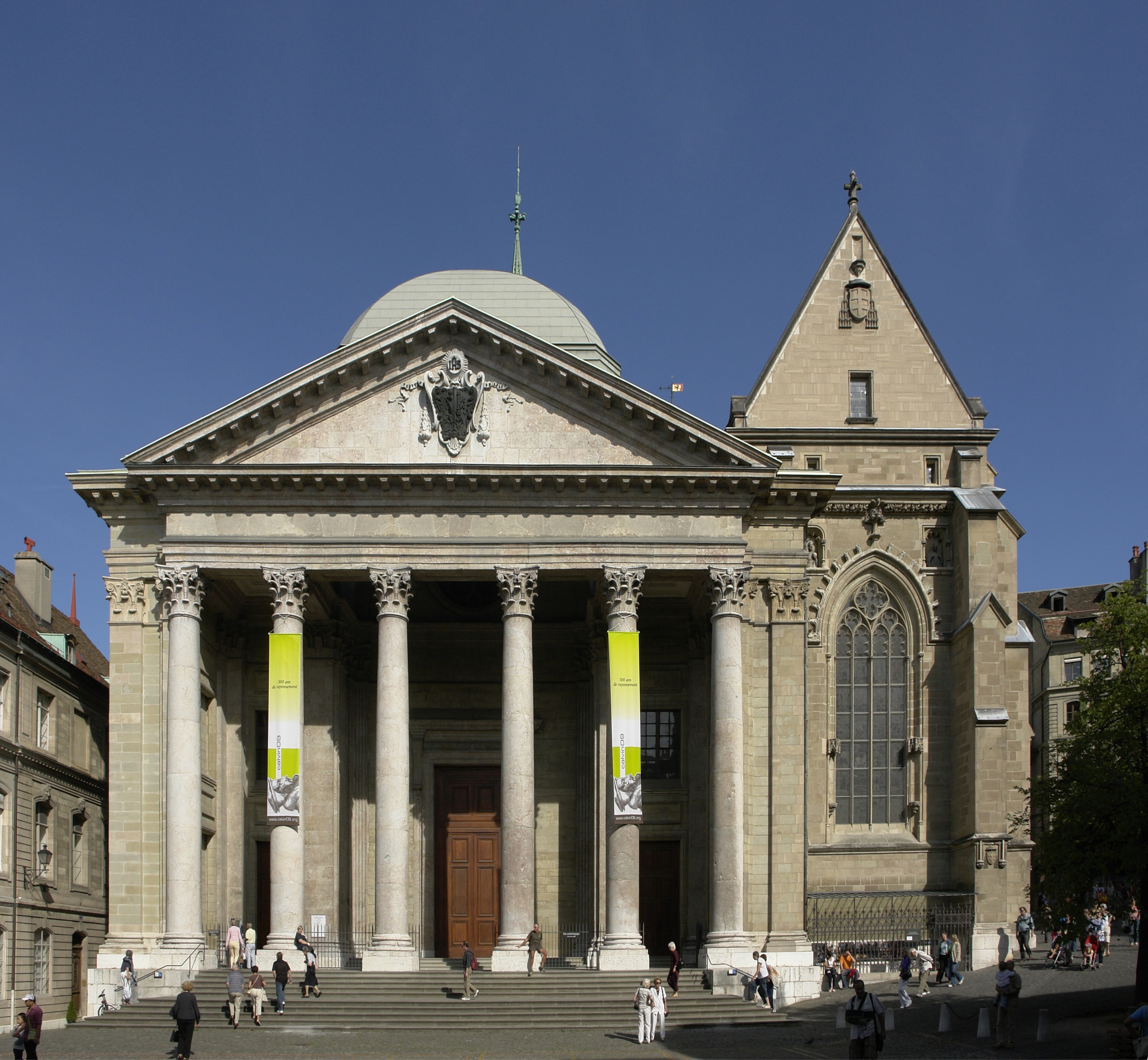
The Neoclassical façade of Saint Pierre Cathedral, Geneva (1752–56)
