= Luigi Miradori =

Italian painter (c. 1600-1610 – c. 1656)

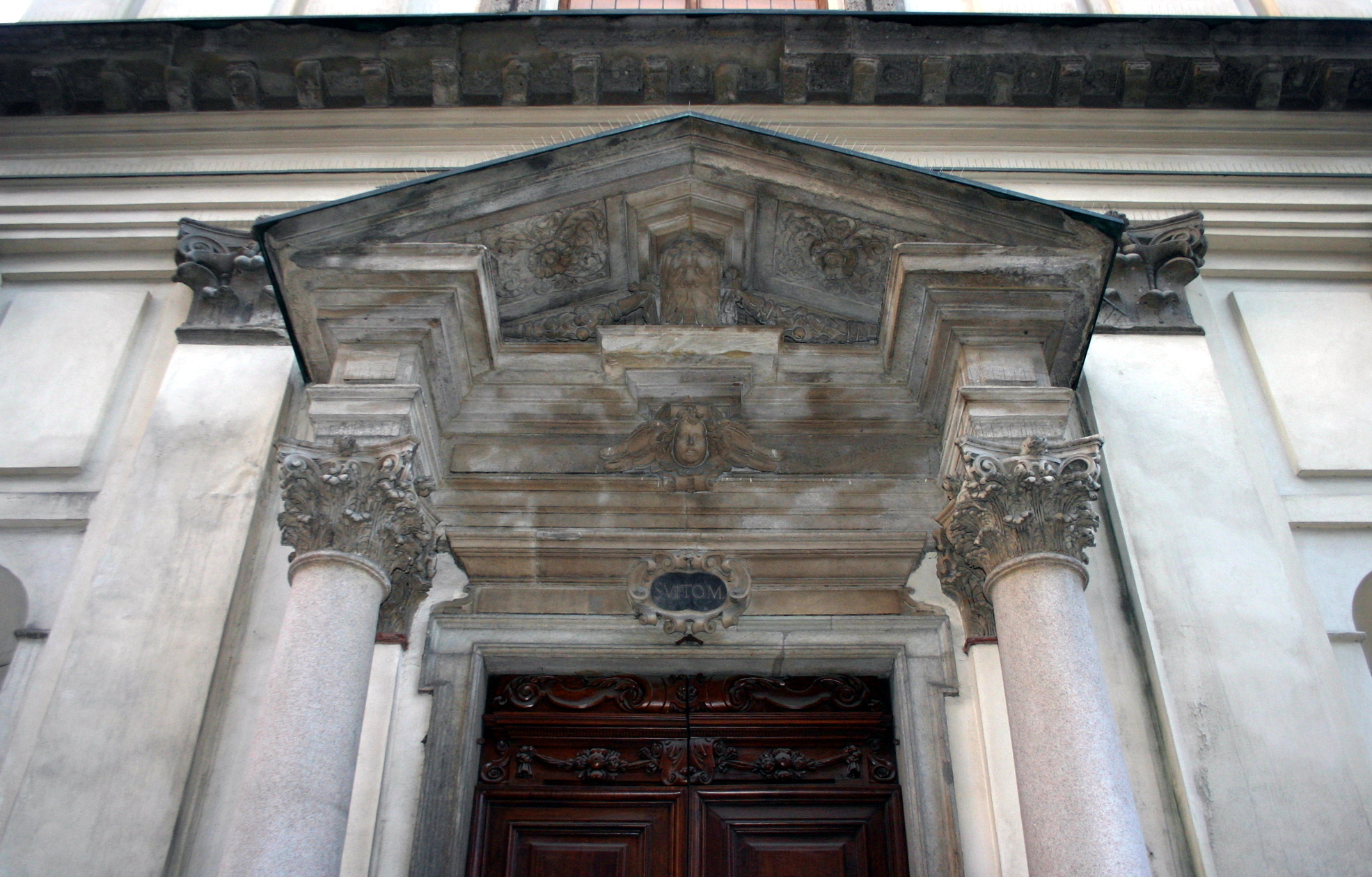
The tympanum of the portal of the church of San Vito in Pasquirolo, designed by Luigi Miradori, 1626-1627

Luigi Miradori (c. 1600-1610 - c. 1656) was an Italian painter of the Baroque period, active mainly in Cremona.

Miradori was born in Genoa, thus also called il Genovese or Genovesino. He was a pupil of the painter Panfilo Nuvolone or il Tanzio or Pietro Martire Neri. In Cremona, he painted a Virgin in Glory for church of San Clemente in Cremona; and a Massacre of Innocents for the church of San Lorenzo. He painted an Execution of the Conspirators, once in the Casa Borri in Milan. He painted a Story of San Rocco for the Cathedral of Cremona, a St John the Damascene & the Madonna (1648) for the church of Santa Maria Maddalena, a Rest on the Flight into Egypt for the church of St. Imerio, and a Miracle of the bread & fishes and a Last Supper for the Palazzo Comunale. In the Cremonese Seminary he painted a Birth of San Carlo Borromeo (1642) and in the Museo Civico Ala Ponzone there are 11 paintings. An exhibition of Miradori paintings was held in the Ala Ponzone in 2018.
