= Palazzo Mezzabarba =

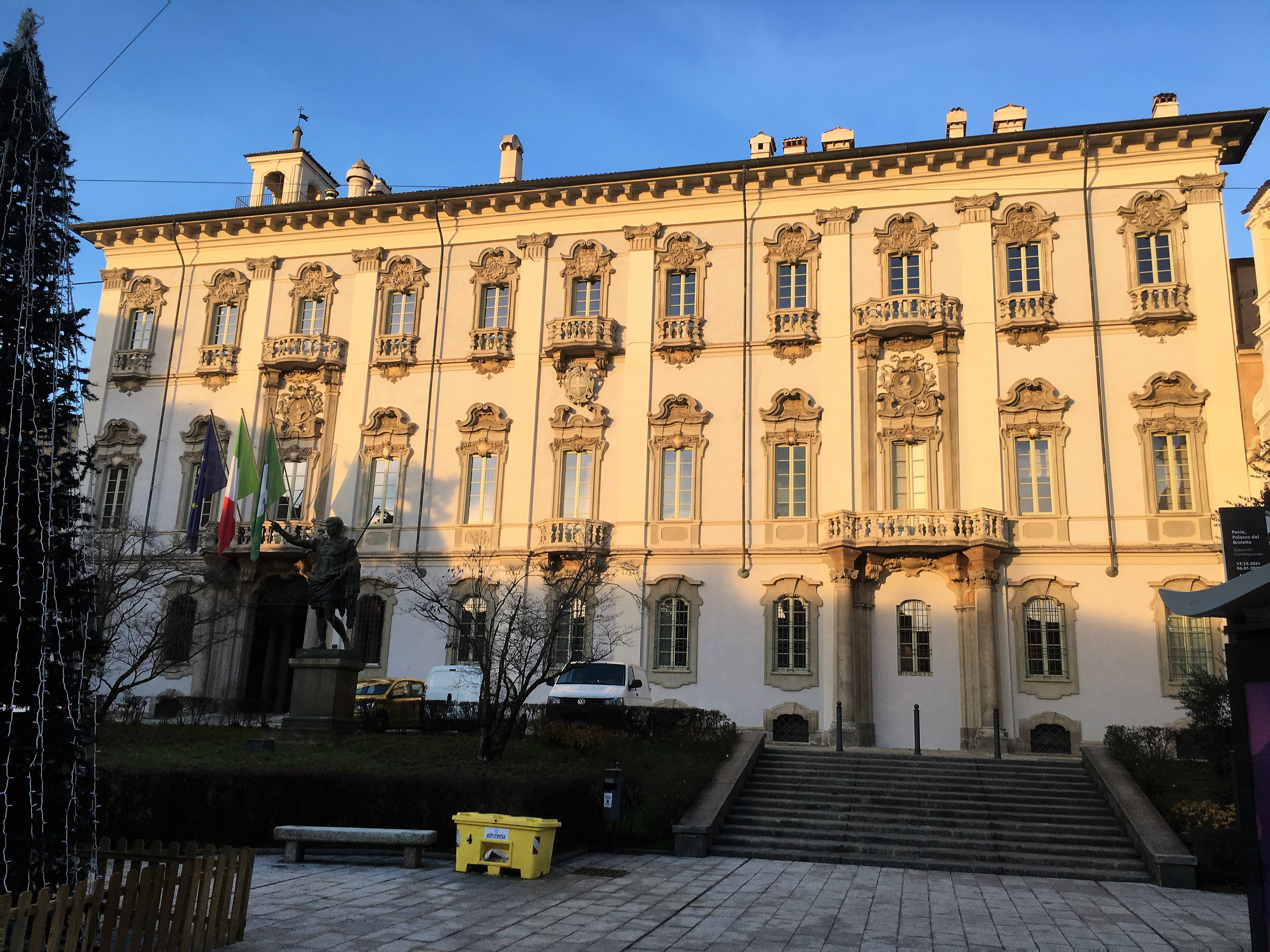
- Facade
- Interactive map of the Palazzo Mezzabarba area

General information
- Type: Palace
- Architectural style: Rococo
- Location: Pavia, Italy
- Coordinates: 45°11′5″N 9°9′35″E
- Opened: 1726
- Owner: Municipality of Pavia

Design and construction
- Architect: Giovanni Antonio Veneroni

Palazzo Mezzabarba is a palace in Pavia, Lombardy, a notable example of Lombard rococo. It has served as Pavia's city hall since 1875.

== History ==
The Mezzabarba are an ancient and noble family of Pavia, known since the twelfth century and which was awarded the title of count by Philip III of Spain who granted Alessandro Mezzabarba the fief of Corvino and other places. Between 1726 and 1732 the Pavese aristocrats Girolamo and Giuseppe Mezzabarba commissioned the Pavese architect Giovanni Antonio Veneroni to reconstruct the ancient sixteenth-century town residence according to the dictates of the Rococo style, then in vogue. Next to the palace, Carlo Ambrogio Mezzabarba, papal legate in China, patriarch of Alexandria in 1719 and bishop of Lodi from 1725, then had a private oratory built in 1734, dedicated to Saints Quirico and Giulitta.

In 1872, the municipality acquired the building which, in 1875, became the city hall of Pavia, first housed in the Broletto.

== Architecture ==
The building has a "T" plan, structured on two courtyards. The façade, on which two doors open (symmetrical, of which the one on the right is fake), equipped with columns, is enriched by sinuous decorations, such as shells, typical of the rococo repertoire. The front of the building, with three floors above ground of almost equal importance, has a framing that could be defined as pre-neoclassical, based on the scan obtained by means of the vertical pilasters, slightly overhanging, which rise from the base to the cornice below the eaves; thus anticipating what will later be preferred to the ancient superimposition of orders. Only the horizontal alternation of amplitude of the backgrounds thus obtained alleviates such severe and peremptory subdivision. But the greatest contrast can be seen between the severity of the pilasters and the abundance of architectural-decorative elements of the windows and even more so of the balconies, where the curve and the corner take on a plastic rather than architectural aspect and the stone of which they are facts seem to assume a carnal nature. Originally the square in front of the building was much narrower and only between 1911 and 1936 was it enlarged, thus giving a different view to the facade of the building, due to the demolition of a group of houses facing the building. On the ground floor, a portico (marked by granite columns in pairs or in grandiose groups of four) leads to the grand staircase, from which you can reach the halls of the noble floor of the building. The interiors of the building retain important eighteenth-century frescoes, mostly with a mythological theme, such as those in the ballroom (where the gallery for musicians is kept under the ceiling) while others are present in the other rooms. The ballroom (now the town council hall) was entirely frescoed by Giovanni Angelo Borroni, who painted the triumph of the arts and sciences over vices and ignorance on the ceiling, and adorned the walls with the stories of Diana treated with lively imagination. Interesting frescoes by the same author remain in other rooms: Iris appears in a dream to Aeolus, the Chariot of the Sun and Hagar and Ishmael. Most of the frescoes in the rooms were made (as well as by Giovanni Angelo Borroni) also by Pietro Maggi, Francesco Maria Bianchi, who painted the vaults of the representative rooms.

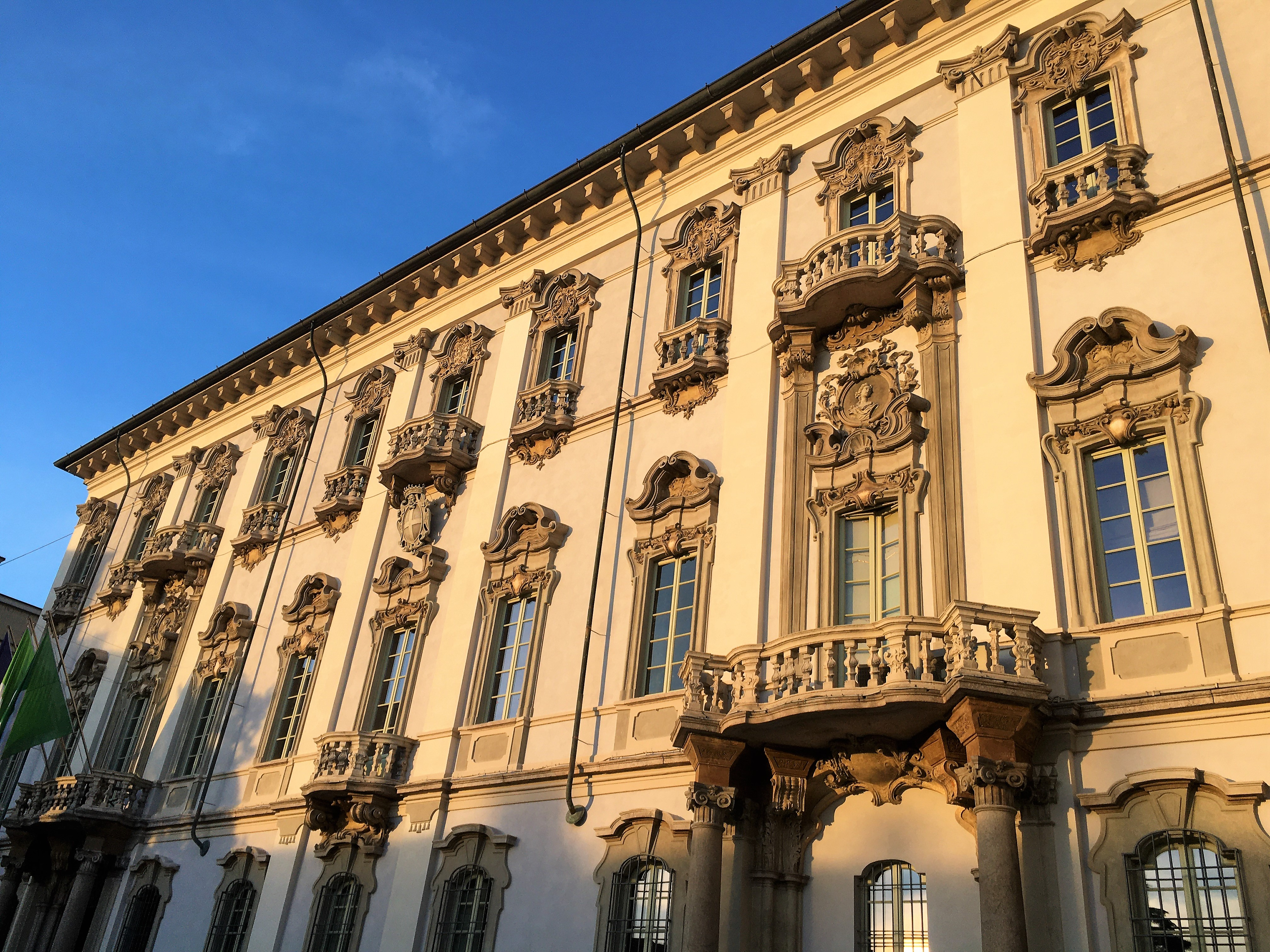
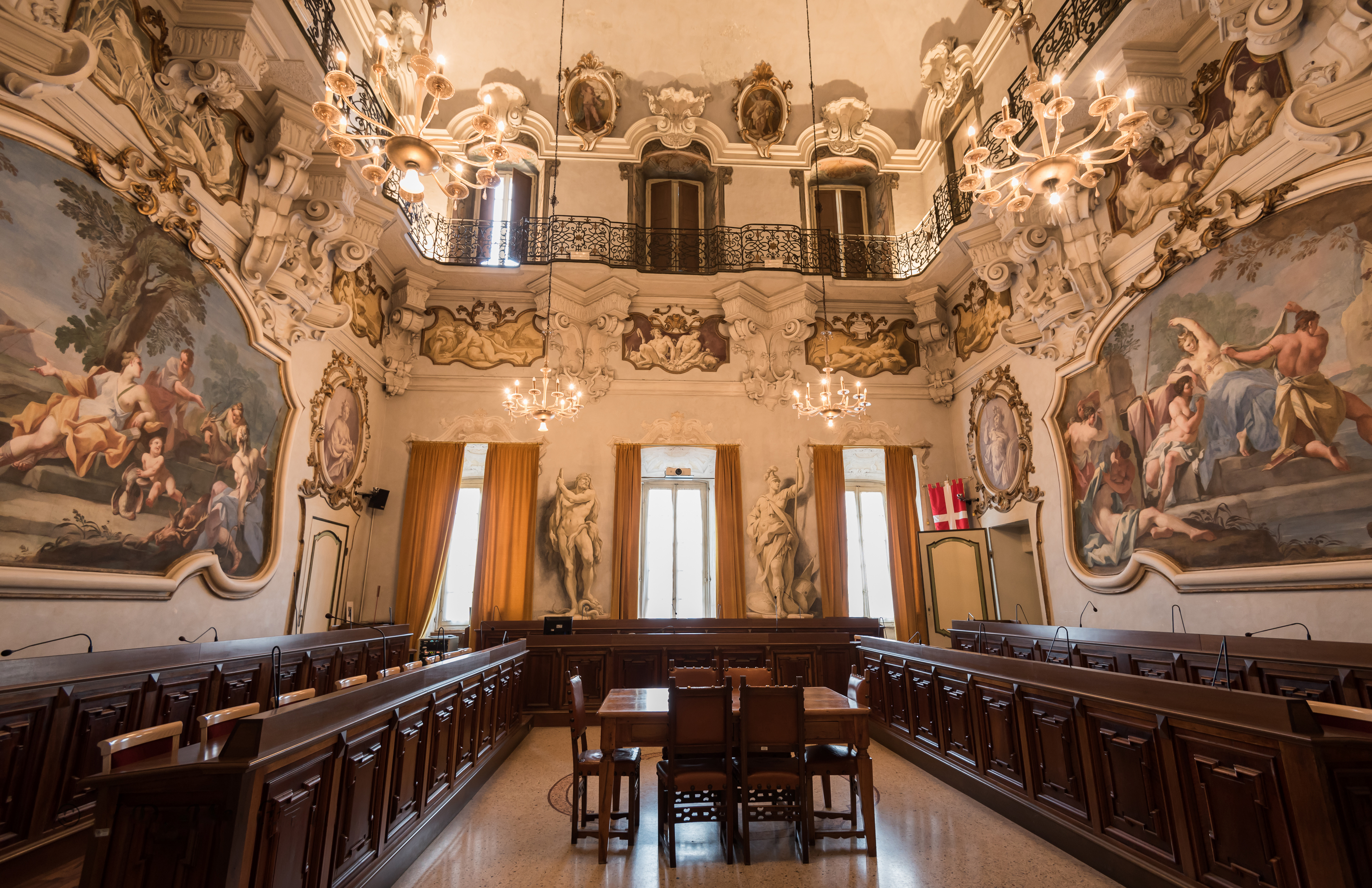
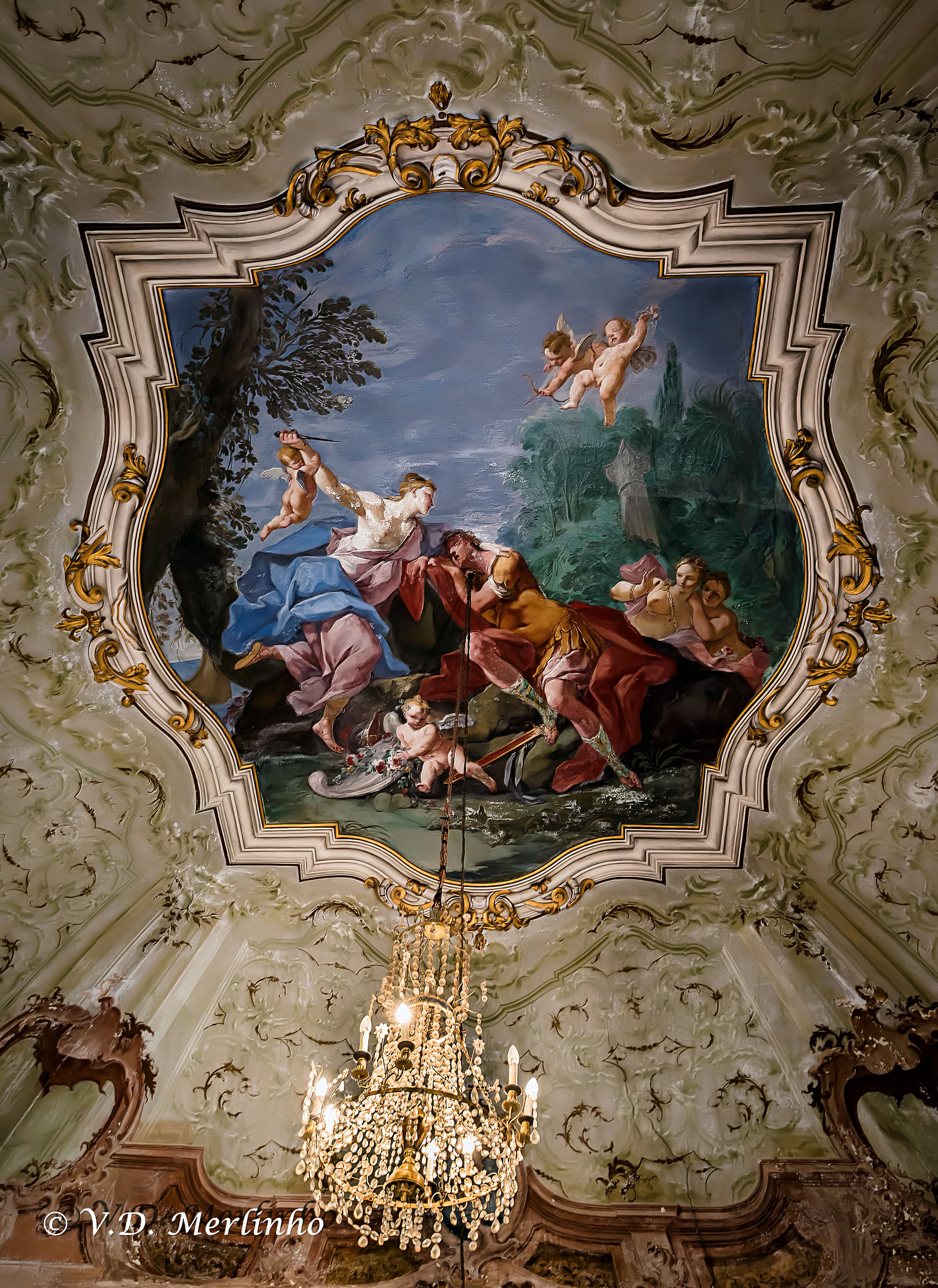
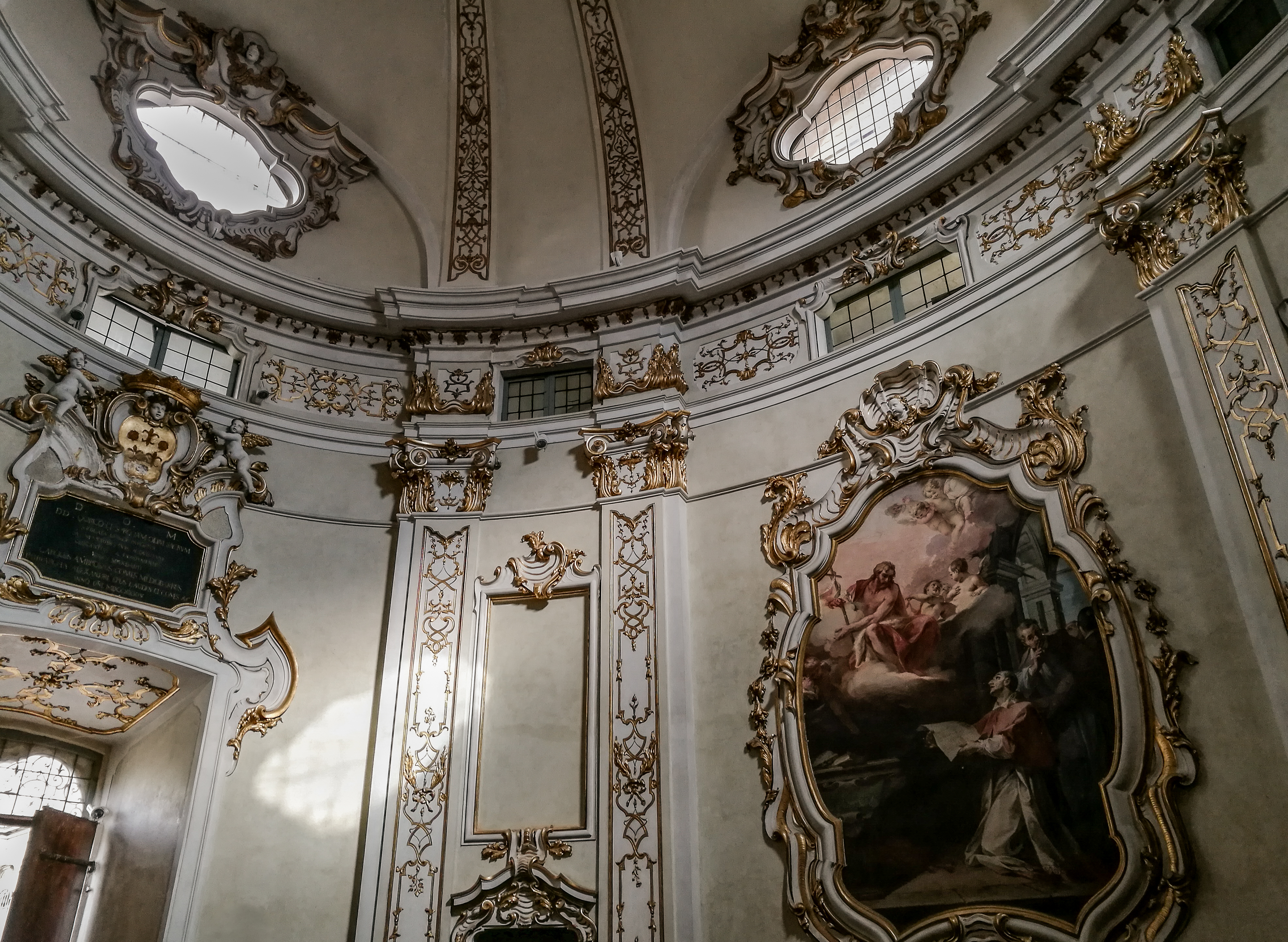
The facade, the ballroom frescoed by Giovanni Angelo Borroni, now the council chamber, one of the rooms frescoed by Giovanni Angelo Borroni, the interior of the oratory, frescoed by Pietro Antonio Magatti.

== Oratory of Saints Quirico and Giulitta ==
In 1733, Carlo Ambrogio Mezzabarba, titular patriarch of Alexandria and bishop of Lodi, commissioned the architect Giovanni Antonio Veneroni to design an oratory in the eastern corner of the building, immediately dedicated to Saints Quirico and Giulitta. The works for the construction of the new church were very fast, so much so that in 1734 the oratory was finished. The oratory is attached to the ground floor of the nearby building, from which, albeit in more severe forms, it incorporates many of the decorative elements of the main facade. The facade has two small bell towers, which converge towards the center of the building and are joined by a balcony. The interior, with an elliptical plan, is entirely enriched with gilded sticks. The fresco on the vault, depicting the Glory of Saints Cyricus and Julitta, is the work of the Milanese painter Francesco Maria Bianchi, while the walls retain two frescoes by Pietro Antonio Magatti, in which the Immaculate Conception and Saint Charles Borromeo are painted. Also by Magatti is the altarpiece, which depicts the Martyrdom of Saints Cyricus and Julitta.

== Bibliography ==
- Marica Forni, Cultura e residenza aristocratica a Pavia tra '600 e '700, Milano, Franco Angeli, 1989
- Geoffrey Beard, Stucco and Decorative Plasterwork in Europe, New York, Harper & Row, 1983
- Giacomo C. Bascapè, Carlo Perogalli, Palazzi privati di Lombardia, Milano, Banco Ambrosiano, 1964
