= Pietro da Pietri =

Italian painter

Pietro da Pietri (1663 – 1708, 1716, or 1721) was an Italian painter of the late-Baroque period, active mainly in Rome.

Born in Premia, he was a pupil of the painter Giuseppe Ghezzi, then of Angelo Massarotti, then assisted in the studio of Carlo Maratta. He is also known as Pietro Antonio da Pietri, Pietro dei Pietri, and Pietro de' Pietri. He painted an altarpiece of the Virgin with Saints for Santa Maria in Via Lata.
