= Giovanni Angelo Borroni =

Italian painter (1684–1772)

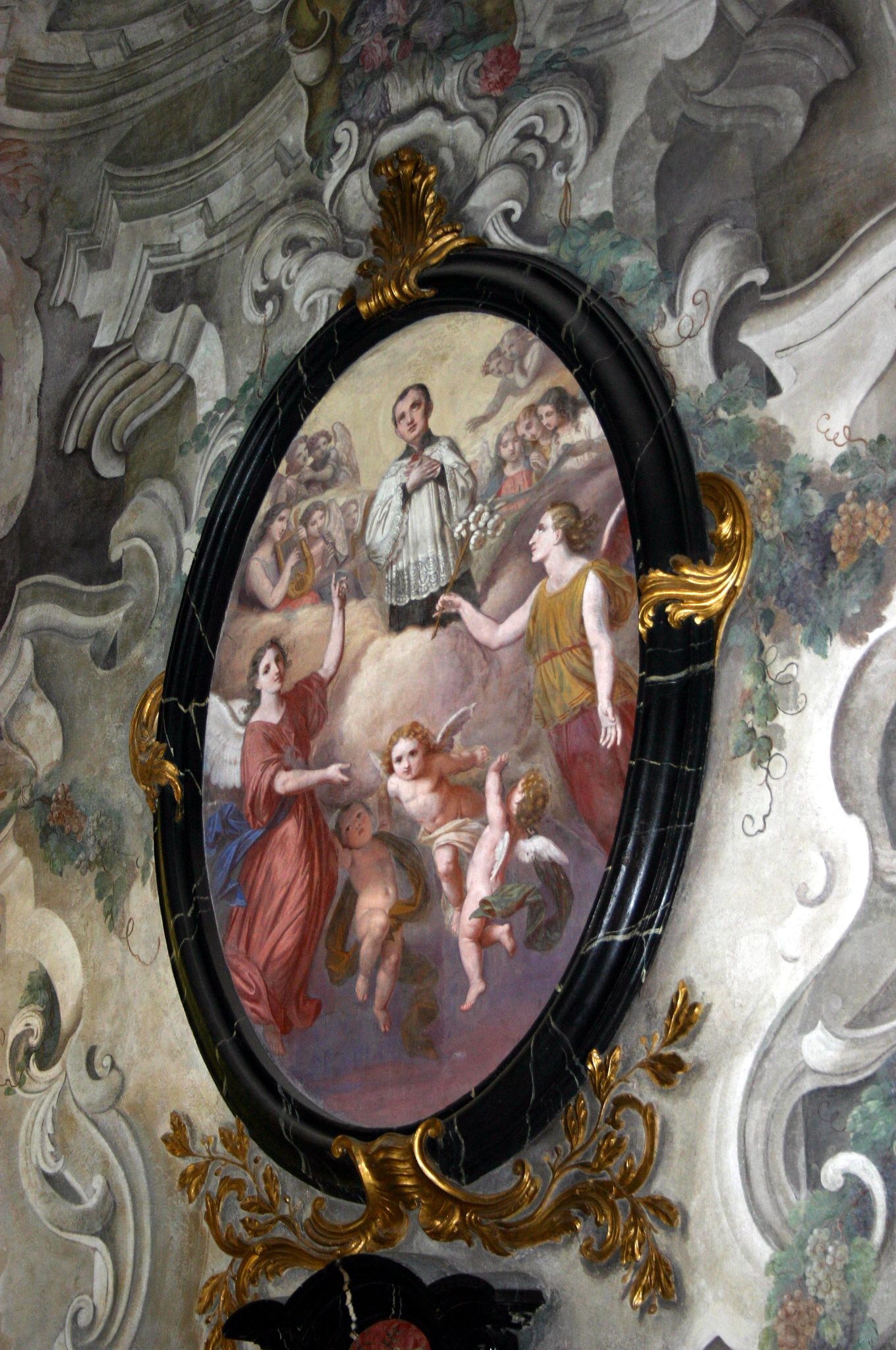
Scene from the life of Aloysius Gonzaga, painted by Giovanni Angelo Borroni, Basilica of San Simpliciano

Giovanni Angelo Borroni (1684 – 1772) was an Italian painter of the late-Baroque and early-Neoclassic periods, active mainly in Milan and Cremona.

== Biography ==
He was born in Cremona and died in Milan. He was the pupil of the painter Angelo Massarotti, and afterwards of Robert de Longe. On leaving those masters, he was patronised by the noble family of Crivelli, and was employed some years in ornamenting their palace. He painted several pictures for the churches at Cremona and Milan. In the Cathedral of Milan, he painted St. Benedict in the act of interceding for the city. He painted frescoes on mythologic themes for the Palazzo Mezzabarba, Palazzo Botta Adorno in Pavia and for the Villa Brentano Carones in Corbetta, along with Mattia Bortoloni. He also painted a Glory of the Saint (1755) for the cupola of the church dedicated to San Omobono of Cremona.
