= Pietro Frassi =

Italian painter

Pietro Frassi (before 1716–circa 1778) was an Italian painter of the late-Baroque period, active in his native Cremona.

== Biography ==
Frassi trained in Cremona with Angelo Massarotti from 1716, until the latter's death in 1723. he then moved to Rome. He painted a Miracle of St Vincent Ferrer for one of the chapels of the church of San Domenico, Cremona (church demolished in 1869).
