= Palazzo Sormani =

Coordinates: 45°27′43.73″N 9°11′52.93″E

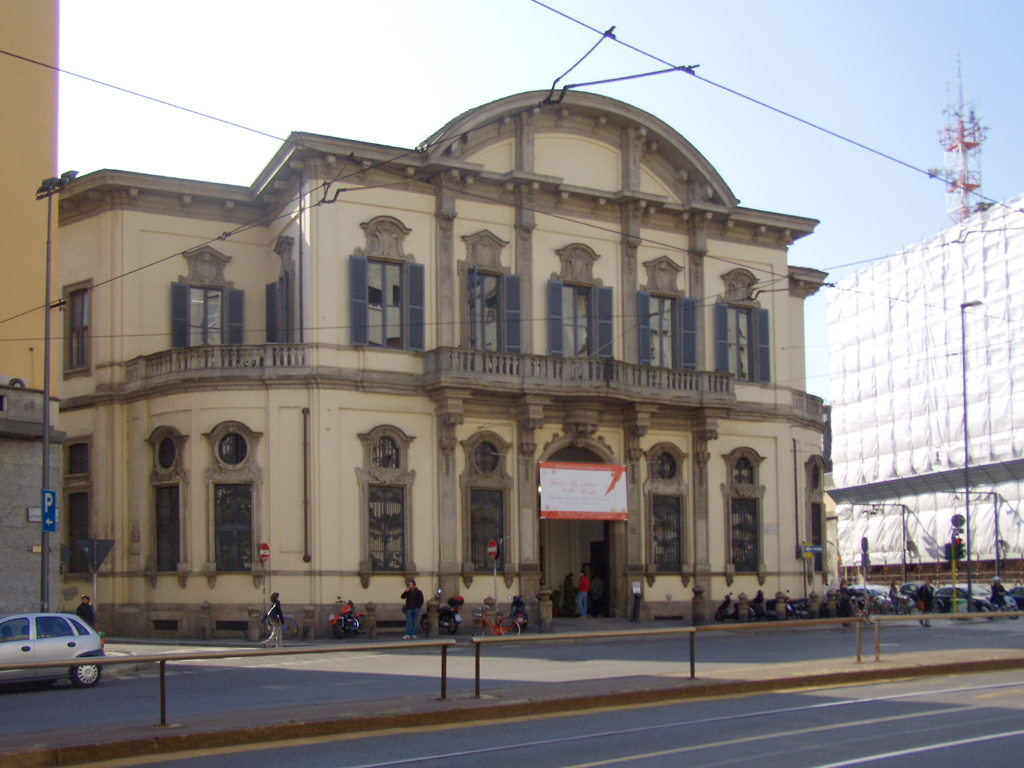
- Palazzo Sormani in Milan
- Click on the map for a fullscreen view

General information
- Architectural style: Baroque
- Location: Milan, Italy

Design and construction
- Architects: Francesco Maria Richini; Francesco Croce; Benedetto Alfieri

Palazzo Sormani (also known as Palazzo Sormani-Andreani or cà Sormana in Milanese dialect) is a historic building of Milan, Italy, and the seat of the central public library of Milan. It is located at number 6 in Corso di Porta Vittoria, in the Zone 1 administrative division of the city.

== History ==
The core of the building, much smaller than the present palace, dates back to the 16th century, as testified by a memorial plaque, now located in the hall. General Giovanni Batista Castaldo was the first owner. Castaldo activated in Transylvania and managed to get a large part of the gold treasure of king Decebal of Dacia. The building was restored and enlarged in the 17th century, when it became the property of Cardinal Cesare Monti, who used the palace as the seat of his art collection. At the Cardinal's death, his heir Cesare Monti-Stampa acquired the building and enlarged it again. Architect Francesco Croce, most notably, designed the current rococo facade. A secondary facade was added in the 18th century, on a design by Benedetto Alfieri, heading towards the palace's gardens.

In 1783 the palace was sold to Giovanni Pietro Paolo Andreani, a relative of the Sormani family, and was renamed "Palazzo Sormani-Andreani". Giovanni Pietro Paolo and his heir Paolo enriched the building interior with stuccos (created by Agostino Gerli) as well as a series of paintings depicting the myth of Orpheus, by an unknown artist.

In 1930, the building was acquired by the Comune di Milano, that adapted it as an art gallery; this was dismantled after World War II, as a consequence of the palace being severely damaged by Allied bombings. A new restoration (by architect Arrigo Arrighetti) followed, in 1956; thereafter, the palace was chosen as the seat of Milan's public library.

== The park ==
Palazzo Sormani has an inner garden, designed in the 18th century by Leopold Pollack. In 1955, a complex of statues by Agenore Fabbri, on the subject of boar hunting, was placed in the park.
