= Francesco Croce =

Italian architect (1696–1773)

18th-century portrait of Francesco Croce (Pinacoteca Ambrosiana)

Francesco Croce (1696–1773) was an Italian baroque architect. He was mainly active in Milan, where he worked for the Veneranda Fabbrica del Duomo di Milano. Among other things, he designed the highest spire of the Duomo, the guglia del tiburio ("lantern spire"), on top of which the Madonnina statue is currently placed.

== Notable works ==
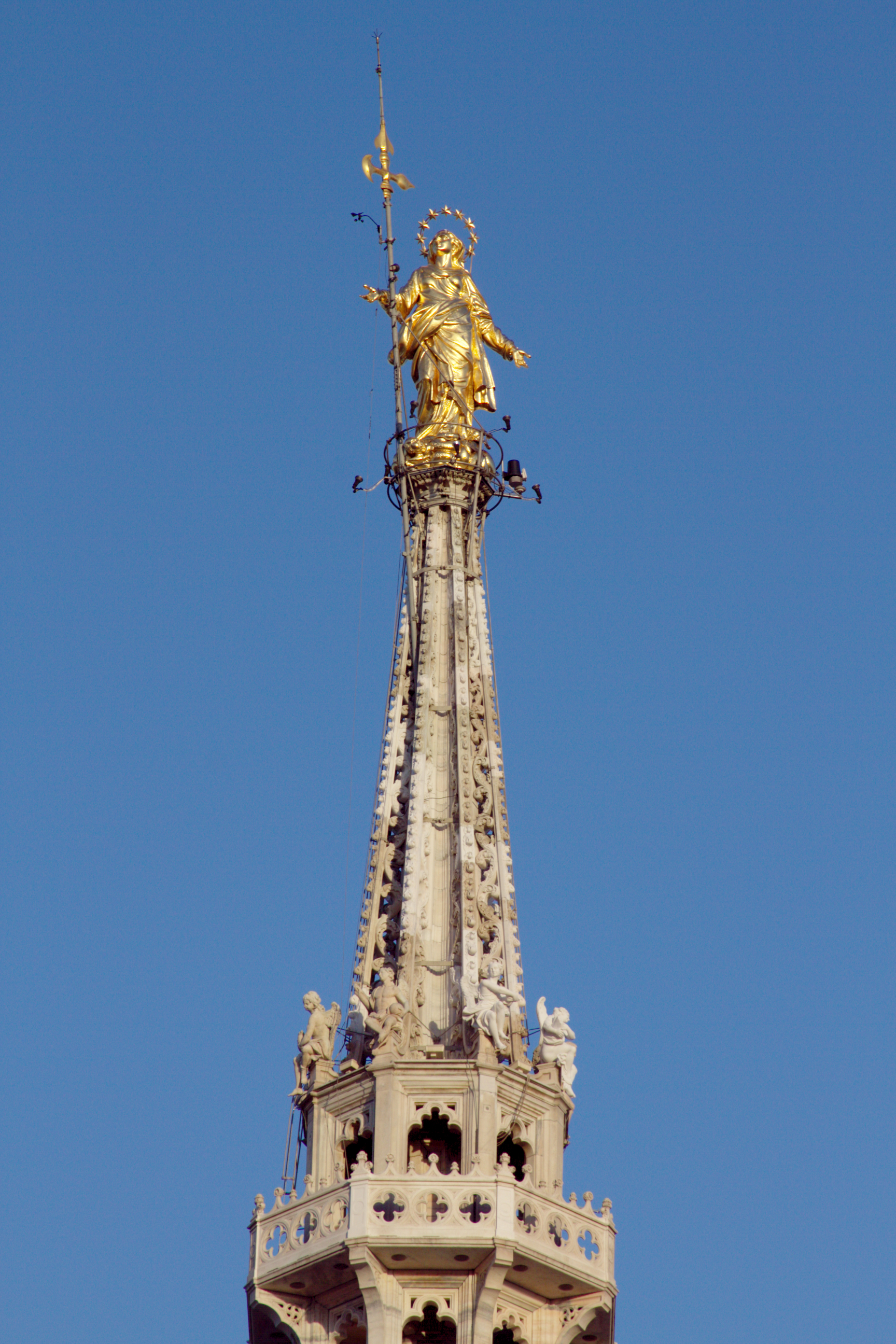
Guglia del tiburio ("lantern spire"), the highest spire of the Duomo

Prominent works of Francesco Croce include:

- Guglia del Tiburio ("lantern spire") of the Duomo in Milan
- Portico of the Rotonda della Besana in Milan
- Palazzo Brentano in Corbetta
- Palazzo Clerici in Niguarda, Milan
- Palazzo Sormani in Milan
- Palazzo Bellisomi Vistarino in Pavia
- San Pietro, Abbiategrasso (church)
- San Bartolomeo, Piacenza (church)

He is also responsible for a major restoration of the Duomo di Lodi, and for the renewal of the historic Palazzo della Ragione in Milan, with the addition of a new upper floor with large round windows

- Villa Massari in Corbetta
- Villa Pertusati, Comazzo
