= Rotonda della Besana =

Former cemetery in Milan, Italy

Coordinates: 45°27′35.2″N 9°12′18.7″E

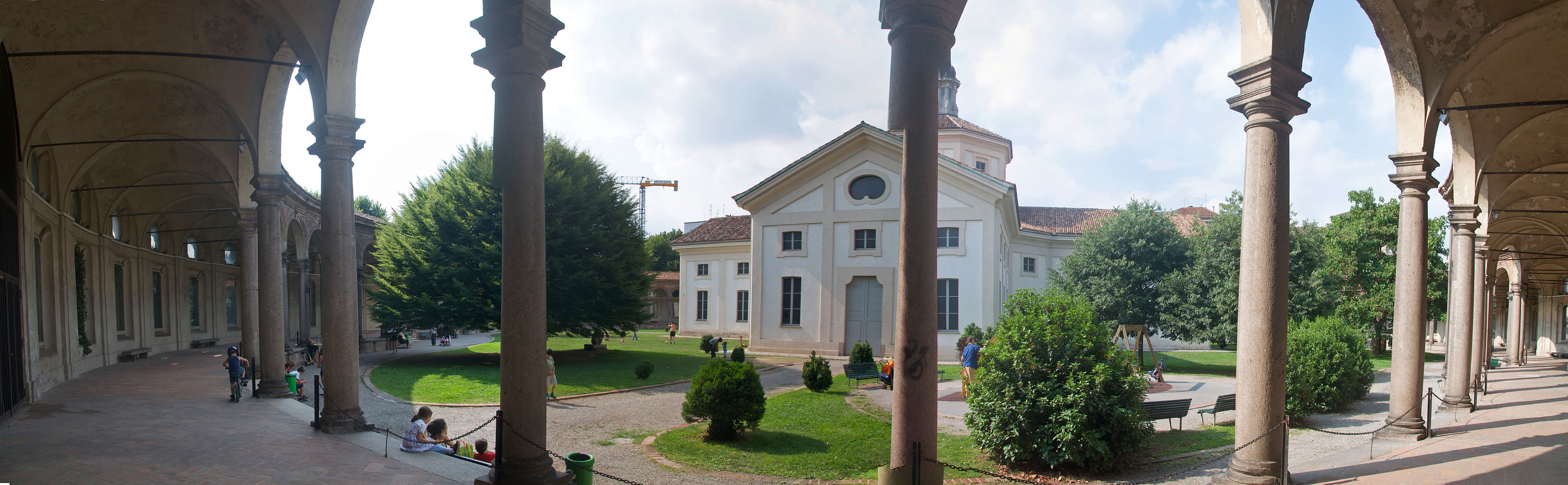
The church as seen from the portico

The Rotonda della Besana (also known as Rotonda di Via Besana or Complesso di San Michele ai Nuovi Sepolcri, and originally as Foppone della Ca' Granda) is a late baroque building complex and former cemetery in Milan, Italy, built between 1695 and 1732 and located close to the city center. The complex comprises a lobate hectagonal colonnade portico enclosing a garden and the deconsacrated church of San Michele ai Sepolcri ("Saint Michael by the Sepulchers"). The portico was designed by architects Francesco Croce and Carlo Raffaello Raffagno, while the church was designed by Attilio Arrigoni. Although originally a cemetery, over time the Rotonda has been adapted for a number of other uses; today, it is a leisure area and a venue for cultural events.

The complex covers an overall area of 7,100 m^{2} and owes its current name to its location, at number 15 of Via Enrico Besana.

== History ==
The building was originally established to serve as a foppone (i.e., a cemetery for the poor) for the Ospedale Maggiore (also known as the Ca' Granda, "Big House"), and hosted about 150,000 burials, placed in a complex system of catacombs (the catacombs are no longer accessible). In 1787, under Austrian rule, cemeteries were moved outside the city walls, and the Rotonda cemetery was thus dismissed. Under Napoleonic rule, plans were made to redesign the Rotonda into a famedio (i.e., a honorific burial place) along the lines of the Panthéon in Paris, but these plans were later dismissed. The Rotonda was thus adapted for a number of other uses, including as a stable and a barn. In the 19th century it was returned to the Ospedale Maggiore, which used it as a cronicario (a shelter for the chronically sick) and a laundry building. The Ospedale eventually donated the structure to the Comune di Milano, in 1939. The Comune restored the complex and adapted it to serve as a green area and as a venue for cultural and social events.
