= Sigismondo Benini =

Italian painter

Sigismondo Benini (18th century) was an Italian painter of the Baroque period, active in Lombardy, painting landscapes or vedute. He was born in Cremona, and trained with Angelo Massarotti. His son Giuseppe Benini also painted landscapes. His grandson Luigi Benini, died at age 34 years. He had studied in Rome and returned to Cremona in 1790.
