= Angelo Massarotti =

Italian painter (1653–1723)

Angelo Massarotti (1653–1723) was an Italian painter of the Baroque period, active in his native Cremona.

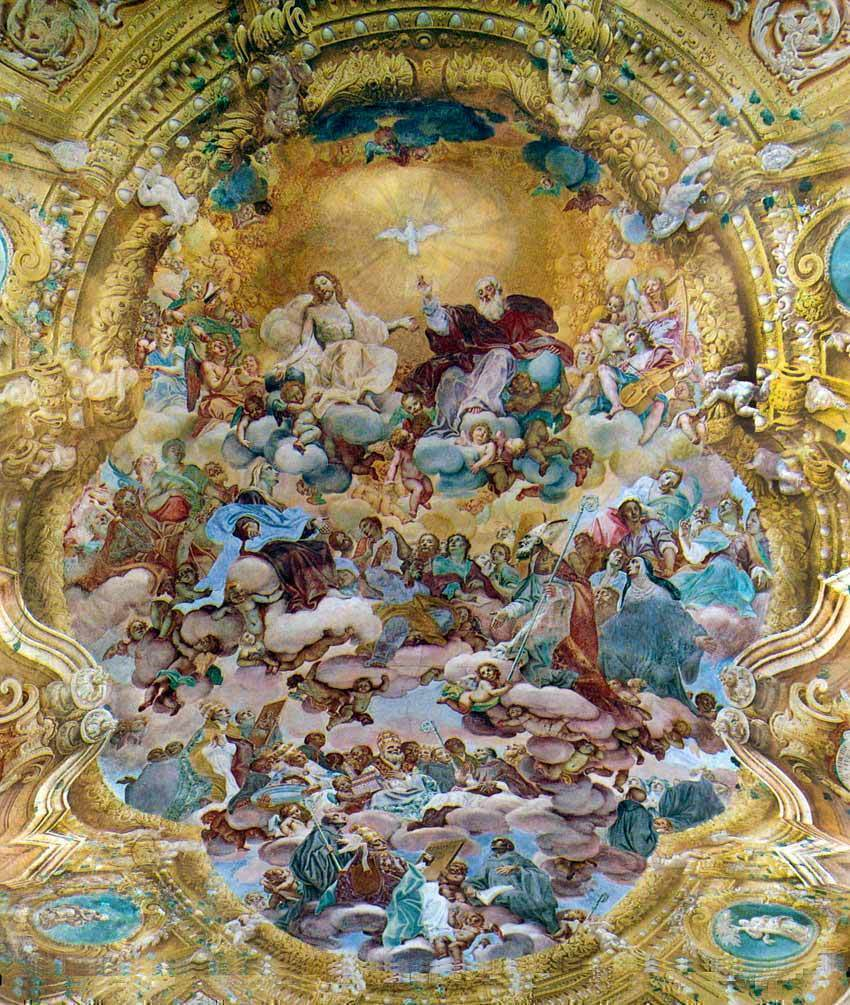
Glory of Trinity in Ceiling of the church of the Monastery of San Benedetto in Cremona.

== Biography ==
Massarotti trained initially with Agostino Bonisoli, then in Rome with Carlo Cesi. The historian Titi (page 379) said he painted a fresco depicting Christ with Santa Lugarda and other for the church of San Salvatore in Lauro. This gained him admission to Accademia San Luca of Rome in 1680, when he returns to Cremona. In Cremona, he painted an Immaculate Conception for the church of Sant'Ilario, and a large canvas over the main door of the church of Sant’Agostino representing the Doctors of the church and founders of religious orders.

Pupils of Massarotti include Giovanni Angelo Borroni, Pietro da Pietro, Sigismondo Benini. Pietro Frassi, and Bernardino Deho.
