= Luca Cattapane =

Italian painter

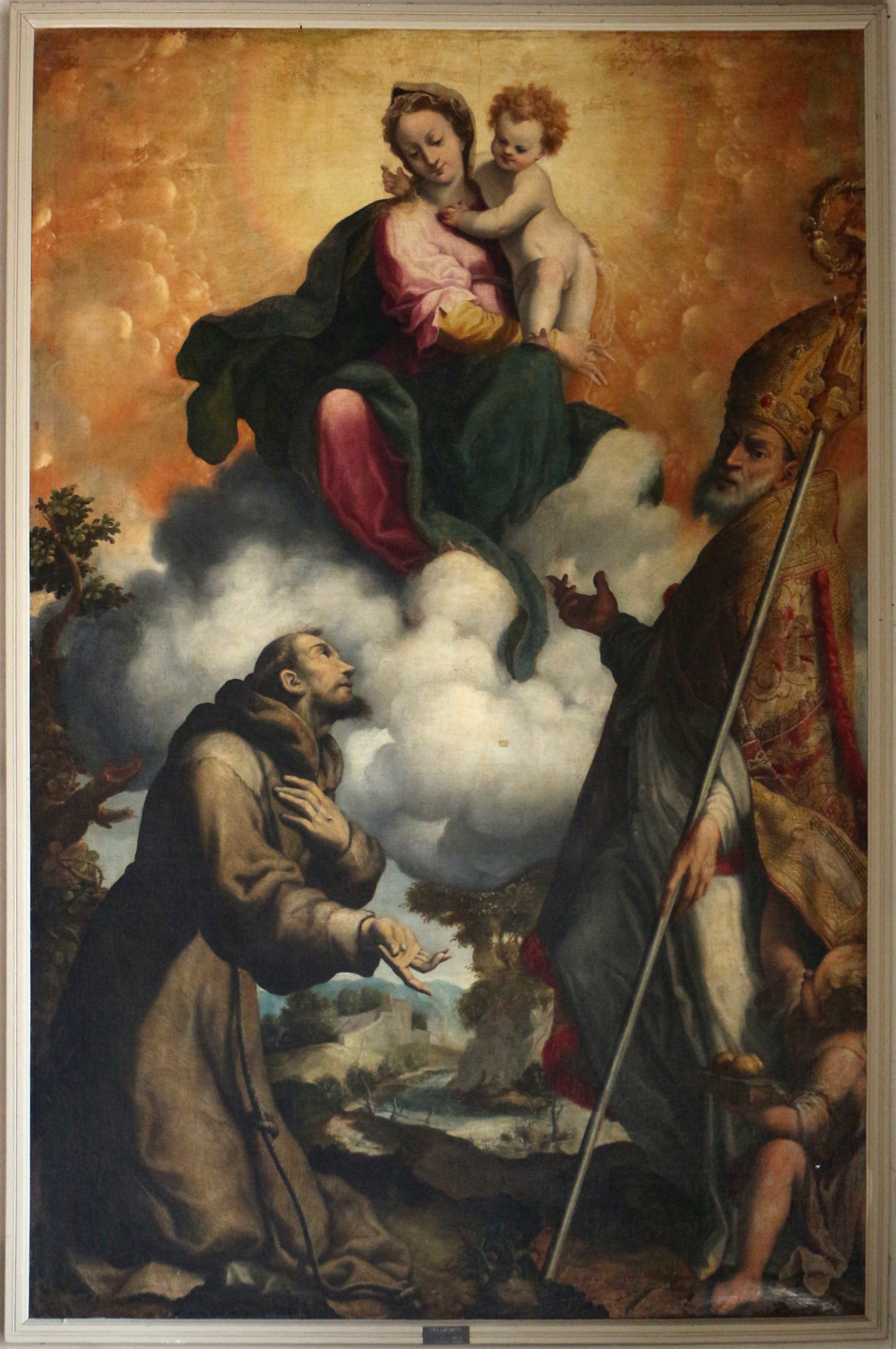
Madonna in Glory between Saint Francis and a Holy Bishop

Luca Cattapane was an Italian painter active during the late 16th century in Cremona. He was a follower of the Campi family in Cremona. He painted an altarpiece now in the church of Sant'Ilario, Cremona. In the church of San Pietro al Po, Cremona, he painted figures for the fresco of the Deposition of Christ by Lattanzio Gambara; and collaborated with Cristoforo Magnani, il Somenzo, Andrea Mainardi, il Malosso and Ermenegildo da Lodi in the fresco decoration of the nave.
