= Sant'Ilario, Cremona =

Church building in Cremona, Italy

Sant'Ilario is an 18th-century, Baroque style, Roman Catholic church in the Cremona region of Lombardy, Italy. It is also known as the Oratory of San Girolamo.

== History ==
A small church at the site existed since 1137, with façade facing east, opposite to the present orientation. In 1716 a new church was commissioned by the Eremitani Scalzi of the Augustinian order. Except for the façade, which remains incomplete in brick, work was complete by 1776.

== Description ==
The interior walls and ceilings are frescoed. The nave has three large frescoes enclosed in elaborate stucco. Additional decoration of the ceiling was added in 1895 by V. Gamba.

In the second chapel on the right, above the altar are two canvases, depicting Mary and her parents, the other the Glory of St Joseph, painted by Francesco Boccaccino. In the presbytery is a depiction of the Baptism of St Augustine by Giulio Cesare Procaccini. In the Choir is a depiction of Bishop St Ilario, Sant'Apollonia, St Jerome, and St Catherine with Madonna and child (1546) by Antonio Campi. In the first chapel on the left, is a depiction of the Immaculate Conception with St Nicola da Tolentino, Angels and the family of the donor, Felice da Pardo (Governor of Cremona in 1698), by Angelo Massarotti. The Via Crucis were painted by the studio of Massarotti.
