= Mattia Bortoloni =

Italian painter

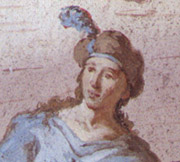
Self-portrait at age 21. Detail from his fresco cycle at Villa Cornaro

Mattia Bortoloni (31 March 1696 – 9 June 1750) was a painter of the early Italian Rococo period. He began his career as a student of Antonio Balestra of Verona and was active throughout northern Italy.

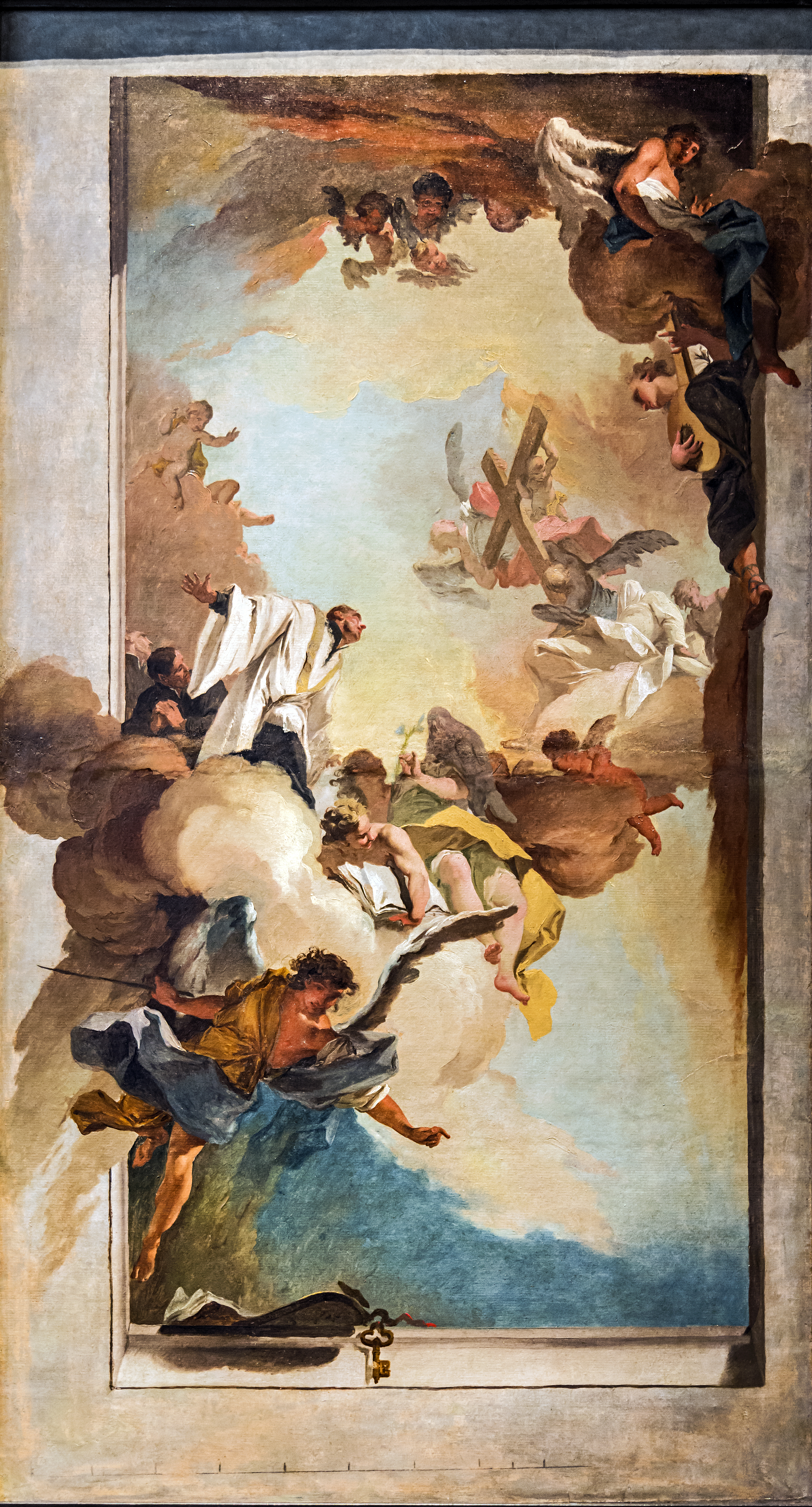
Accademia - Gloria di san Gaetano da Thiene (Glory of Saint Cajetan) 1729.

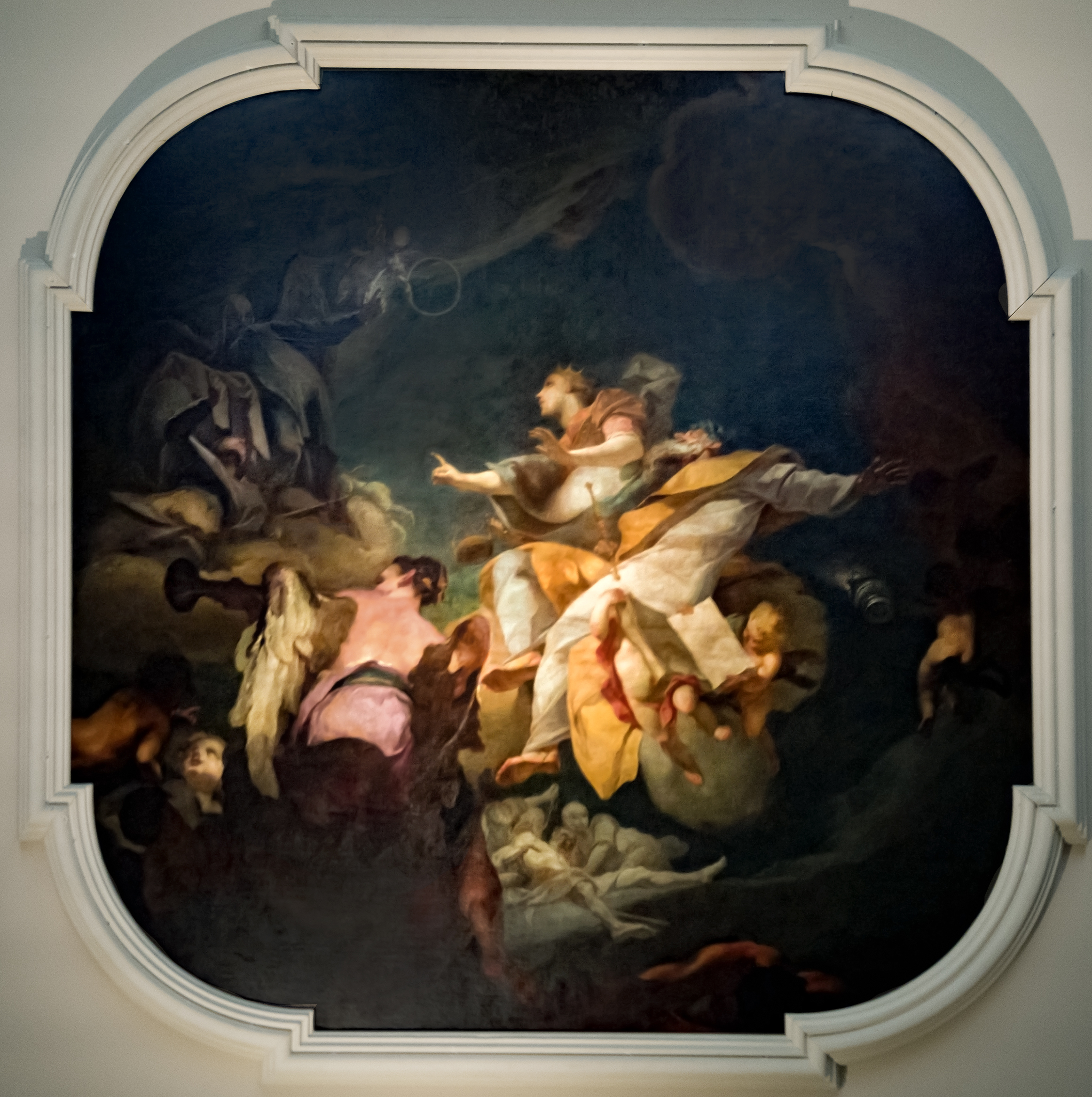
Allegory of Merit, Ca' Rezzonico

== Biography ==
For many years the growth of Bortoloni's reputation was constrained by two factors. First, his work was heavily centered on frescos (that is, wall paintings created in wet plaster), which generally must be viewed on-site and are often located in places of restricted accessibility. Second, some of his most important work became, through the years, anonymous or mis-attributed to others, including his better-known rival, Giovanni Battista Tiepolo, who was born in the same year. Since 1950, however, appreciation of Bortoloni's work has been revived by new scholarly discoveries and several exhibitions with informative catalogs.

The first major breakthrough came in 1950 with publication of Nicola Ivanoff's provocative discovery that the mysterious and anonymous 104-panel fresco cycle at Villa Cornaro-Gable, the acclaimed villa in Piombino Dese designed by the Renaissance architect Andrea Palladio in 1551, was in fact the precocious work of Bortoloni, executed in 1717 when the artist was just 21 years old. The new attribution and the dating of the frescos moved Bortoloni out from Tiepolo's shadow so that he could be seen as an innovative artist in his own right. Antonio Romagnolo made the point when he noted that the fresco cycle at Villa Cornaro introduces "a richness of new elements that anticipates the rococo of Tiepolo."

The early 20th century brought the further discovery that Bortoloni had flexibly based his imagery at Villa Cornaro-Gable in large part upon an illustrated Bible published in Amsterdam in 1700, apparently in response to the requirement of the patron, Proc. Cornaro.

Another event prompting reevaluation of Bortoloni's work was the ambitious program launched in 1982 to restore Bortoloni's most spectacular work, the cupola of the Sanctuario Basilica "Regina Montis Regalis" in Vicoforte, south of Turin. Bortoloni's immense fresco ceiling spans one of the world's largest free-standing cupolas, more than 6,000 square meters in area.

Other notable Bortoloni works can be found in: (Venice) the Church of S. Nicolò da Tolentino and Ca' Vendramin-Calergi: (Veneto) the parish churches of Castelguglielmo and Rovigo; (Lombardy) Palazzo Clerici in Milan and the Cathedral in Monza; (Piedmont) the parish church of San Lorenzo and Palazzo Falletti di Barolo in Turin.

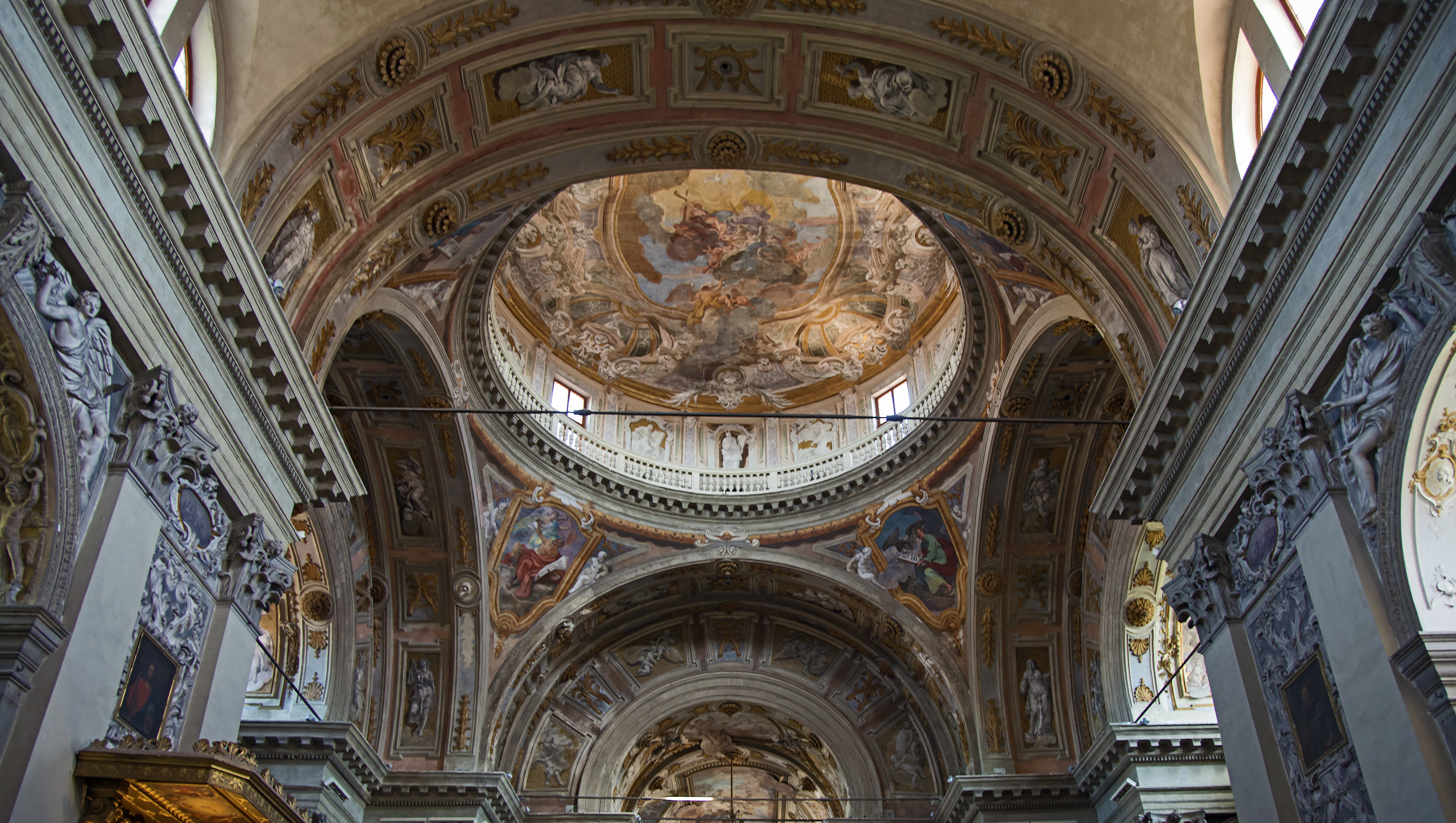
Ceiling of Church of Tolentini, Venice (Venice)

== Sources ==
Ernesto Billò, Santuario Basilica della Natività di Maria Regina Montis Regalis, Vicoforte (Gorle: Editrice Velar, 2012). ISBN 978-88-01-05107-0.

Roderick Conway Morris, "The Irreverence of a Forgotten Master," International Herald Tribune, 29 May 2010.

Carl I. Gable, Villa Cornaro in the Enlightenment: Adapting a Palladian Villa to Eighteenth Century Ideals (Atlanta: Boglewood, 2013).

Mercedes Precerutti Garberi, Frescos from Venetian Villas (New York: Phaidon, 1971), pp. 54–57; Italian edition: Affreschi Settecenteschi delle Ville Venete (Milan: Silvana Editoriale, 1975), pp. 67–68 and plates 55-61.

Nicola Ivanoff, "Mattia Bortoloni e gli Affreschi Ignoti della Villa Cornaro a Piombino Dese," Arte Veneta, vol. 4 (1950), pp. 123–130.

Douglas Lewis, "Freemasonic Imagery in a Venetian Fresco Cycle of 1716," in Hermeticism and the Renaissance: Intellectual History and the Occult in Early Modern Europe, edited by Ingrid Merkel and Allen G. Debus, (Washington, D. C.: The Folger Shakespeare Library, 1988), pp. 366–399.

Fabrizio Malachin and Alessia Vedova, editors, Bortoloni Piazzetta Tiepolo: Il '700 Veneto (Milan: Silvana Editoriale, 2010).

[David Martin], Historien des Ouden en Nieuwen Testaments (Amsterdam: Pieter Mortier, 1700), translated from French by William Sewel.

Filippo Pedrocco, editor, Gli affeschi nei ville venete dal '500 al '700 (Schio: Sassi Editore, 2008), pp. 228–227; English edition: Frescoes of the Veneto: Venetian Palaces and Villas (New York: Vendome Press, 2009).

Antonio Romagnolo, editor, Mattia Bortoloni (Rovigo: Comune di Rovigo, 1987).
