= Corbetta, Lombardy =

Corbetta
- Comune
- Città di Corbetta
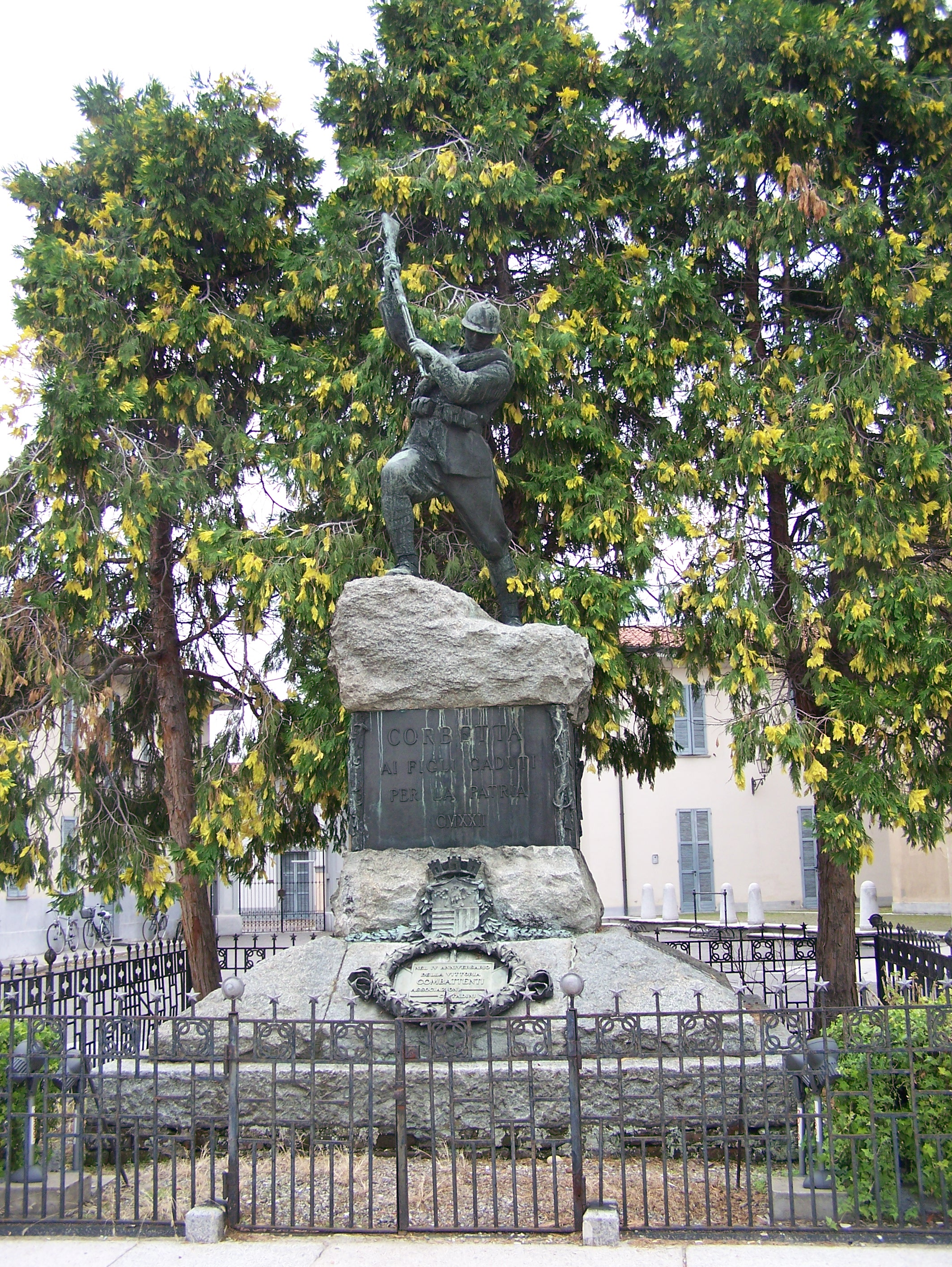
- Monument to victims of World War I.

- Flag Coat of arms

- Location within Italy Location within Lombardy
- Coordinates: 45°28′N 8°55′E
- Country: Italy
- Region: Lombardy
- Metropolitan city: Milan (MI)
- Frazioni: Battuello, Castellazzo de' Stampi, Cerello, Soriano; locality: Pobbia, Isola Bellaria, Preloreto

Government
  - Mayor: Marco Ballarini

Area
  - Total: 18 km^{2} (6.9 sq mi)
- Elevation: 140 m (460 ft)

Population (28 February 2014)
  - Total: 18,161
  - Density: 1,000/km^{2} (2,600/sq mi)
- Demonym: Corbettesi
- Time zone: UTC+1 (CET)
  - Summer (DST): UTC+2 (CEST)
- Postal code: 20011
- Dialing code: 02
- Patron saint: San Vittore
- Saint day: 8 May
- Website: Official website

Corbetta (Lombard: Corbetta [kurˈbɛta], locally [kurˈbeta]) is a comune (municipality) in the Metropolitan City of Milan in the Italian region of Lombardy.

Corbetta is also home of the Sanctuary of the Madonna of Miracles where, according to tradition, a miracle occurred in 1555, when Jesus emerged from a painting of the Infant and healed a local deaf child. The church became a destination for pilgrimages.

== Geography ==
=== Physical geography ===
The city of Corbetta has a planned layout, which is typical of the towns of the Po Valley, with forested areas and cultivation occupying roughly three-quarters of the municipality's territory. In terms of elevation, the settlement is very flat; the lowest point is 127 metres (417 ft) above sea level and the highest point is 147 metres (482 ft), a difference of only 20 metres (66 ft).

A noteworthy aspect of the town is that it is filled with many small streams, helping to shape the typical landscape of Corbetta; these rivers are now in the Parco Agricolo Sud Milano (Natural Preservation South of Milan).

Because of its proximity to the Naviglio Grande, Corbetta is a member of the Polo dei Navigli (the cultural area surrounding the aforementioned canal) instituted by the Province of Milan.

Corbetta received the honorary title of city with a presidential decree on February 5, 1988.

=== Climate ===
Month	Jan	Feb	Mar	Apr	May	Jun	Jul	Aug	Sep	Oct	Nov	Dec	Year
Average High (°C)	5.4	8.1	13.0	17.6	21.8	26.3	29.2	27.6	23.9	17.4	10.6	6.4	17.3
Average Low (°C)	0.8	2.7	6.1	9.6	13.3	17.1	19.9	19.0	16.2	11.2	6.0	1.6	10.3
Precipitation (mm)	79	73	77	47	34	20	7	35	76	83	127	109	2007
Hours of Sunshine (avg)	2.9	3.7	4.6	5.6	6.9	7.1	8.1	7.3	5.2	4.1	2.4	2.3	5
Prevailing Wind (dir.-knots)	NW 2.3	SE 2.4	SE 2.6	SE 2.8	SW 2.7	SW 2.6	SW 2.5	SE 2.4	E 2.3	E 2.3	SE 2.3	NW 2.2	2.4

Corbetta exhibits the usual climate of Italy's Northern plains: cold winters and warm summers, with rainfall being most common in autumn and spring. The municipality is in climatic zone E.

=== Political geography ===
Corbetta's territory borders Magenta to the west, Robecco sul Naviglio to the southwest, Cassinetta di Lugagnano and Albairate to the south, Cisliano to the southeast, Vittuone to the east, and Santo Stefano Ticino and Arluno to the north.

Inside the borders, there are four frazioni (administrative subdivisions): Soriano, Castellazzo de' Stampi, Cerello and Battuello (the last two are united in a unique frazione formally called Cerello-Battuello).

Milan, the largest nearby metropolis, is roughly 20 kilometres (12 mi) from Corbetta, but the nearest important center could be considered the bordering settlement of Magenta.

== History ==
=== Pre-Roman and Roman Period ===
Based on glass crockery found in the old castle's well, it appears that the first houses in Corbetta were built between the 7th and 6th centuries BC, when a small community of Celto-Ligurian tribes inhabited the area. In the 4th century BC, Celtic tribes called Insubres arrived. In the 2nd century BC, a Roman colony was established with the goal of defending Milan and the territories to the east of the Ticino River from the incursions of Gauls and Burgundians. In fitting with the defensive purpose of the settlement, city walls were constructed that surrounded a third of the local castle. Archeological sites are visible near the local church, including a Roman altar dedicated to Jupiter and Mani (Sacred Matrons - divinities who were protectors of the family). Archaeologists have also found coins displaying the heads of Julius Caesar, Claudius and Trajan. The city's proximity to Milan, which subsequently became an imperial see, favored the development of Curia Picta (the Roman name for Corbetta), which indicates that there probably was a tribunal located in the settlement, since curia means "tribunal" in Latin.

=== Middle Ages ===
As a result of the siege of Milan led by Uraia's Ostrogoths in 539 AD, Corbetta received exiles coming from that city. It was at this time that Christianity also reached Corbetta; this is attested through the 1971 discovery of a pre-Christian Basilica under the church of Saint Vittore. In 569, the arrival of the Lombards brought the first formal legal documents that expressly mention the village. During the 9th century, the village and the castle of Corbetta passed under the lordship of the Archbishop of Milan. In 1037, hostilities between the Archbishop of Milan, Aribert, and the Holy Roman Emperor, Conrad II, began. This was significant for Corbetta since the Holy Roman Emperor, seeing the difficulty of laying siege to Milan with its multitude of defenders, instead occupied Corbetta and its castle with his troops.

A century after the occupation by Conrad in 1154, emperor Frederick I burned the village during his fight with the united communes of Northern Italy. In an 1162 document - the actum in loco Corbetta, Frederico imperatore regnante - Corbetta is mentioned for the first time under this name. The population of Corbetta fought in the Milanese army in 1239 against emperor Frederick II.

=== Visconti period ===
Following the rising in Milan in 1270, Corbetta became part of the Visconti's dominion, which was almost a return to being under the lordship of an archbishop, as Ottone Visconti was elected archbishop in 1262, effectively making him lord of Milan.

In 1275, Scarsio of Lanfranco from the Borri family, the general captain of Milanese noble exiles, was awarded many estates in the borough of Corbetta for services rendered to Otto and Matteo I Visconti. In July 1289, the representatives of the Republic of Milan and the Marquis William VII of Montferrat convened in Corbetta, with the aim of creating an anti-Visconti alliance. In 1292, Matteo I Visconti resumed power in Milan, and gathered an army at Corbetta to conquer Novara. Visconti's son Galeazzo subsequently became vicar of Novara. In 1299, supporters of Montferrat conspired to conquer the city: Galeazzo Visconti escaped and took shelter in the castle of Corbetta.

At the end of the 13th century, painter Simone da Corbetta created the frescoes in the church and cloister of Santa Maria dei Serviti in Milan, now conserved in the Pinacoteca di Brera. On 4 January 1363, Magenta and Corbetta were conquered by a British mercenary company hired by the Marquis of Monferrato. In 1376, Gian Galeazzo Visconti was sent by his father Galeazzo II against the Montferrat army in an ill-fated campaign that forced the Visconti to withdraw to Corbetta, where he was besieged.

=== Sforza and Italian Wars ===
With the climb to the power of Francesco I Sforza, Corbetta changed lordship and was faithful to the new princes. In 1499, the French troops of Louis XII invaded the Duchy of Milan. After a series of long wars, Milan, and Corbetta with it, became Spanish possessions in 1535

=== 16th-18th centuries ===
On 22 November 1577, Charles Borromeo consecrated the new bells of the church. He visited Corbetta again in 1581. In 1582, the population of Corbetta rebelled against Spanish rule.

In 1631, the German troops, returning from the siege of Mantua, pillaged the area. In 1650, the castle, already partially ruined, was dismantled; what remained was used to build some palaces nearby.

During Austrian rule in Lombardy, baroque villas were built in Corbetta. The parochial church was built after Napoleonic troops occupied Italy.

=== From the Battle of Magenta to contemporary period ===
On 3 June 1859, on the eve of the battle of Magenta, the Massari Villa of Corbetta was one of the headquarters of the Austrian Feldmareshall Ferencz Gyulaj. The 2nd division of Austro-Hungarian cavalry of the VII Army Corps, at the orders of Feldmareshall Lieutenant von Lilia, was quartered in the garden and the stables of the castle

In 1866, a body of the National Guard was garrisoned in the Castle: 150 men divided in four squads under the command of captain Dario Chierichetti. In the 1880s, with the peasants reduced to hunger due to "pendizzi" (debits but also "appendici" in contracts of rent) and low wages and exasperated because of ill-fated vintage years and unexpected deaths of silk worms, often the only source of income, the families came down in public square against the landowners. On 19 May 1889, in front of the Town hall of Corbetta (then situated in Via Cavour), police officers shot into the crowd, killing one person, injuring at least seven, and arresting twenty-one. In 1891, the new church was inaugurated, but the collapse of the bell tower at the cost of nine lives, in June 1902, delayed the completion until 1908. During World War I, 158 soldiers from Corbetta died.

In 1921, the municipality had 7,689 inhabitants. The country's urban planning changed radically due to industrialization, with workers migrating to those towns where industries sprang up. In Corbetta, many workers still found employment in agriculture.

In August 1944, on orders of German captain Theo Saevecke, responsible for the Massacre of Loreto square in Milan, eight civilians, including the local partisan Pierino Beretta, were killed as reprisal for partisan attacks on German troops.

After the end of World War II, Corbetta experienced an economic boom. Corbetta's importance increased, and it became one of the greater natural and cultural centers of the Province of Milan, especially in the 1980s. On 5 February 1988, Corbetta was designated a city by the president of the Italian Republic Francesco Cossiga.

Today, Corbetta is solidifying its status as a cultural and natural center. In 2007, in order to make these goals more realistic, it started to carry out a plan of "ecosustainability". This plan was proposed to lower the town's environmental impact.

== Demographics ==
According to the 2001 census, Corbetta had 13,735 inhabitants, 6,664 males and 7,071 females. Throughout its known history, the city has usually exhibited moderate growth. A peak in population growth occurred from 1881 to 1911, when local industrialization brought in new citizens and new workplaces. Population growth stagnated during the two World Wars but restarted alongside the economic boom of 1951 to 1971. The two most recent censuses have each recorded a small increase of approximately 500 residents. The 2021 census reported 18,763 residents, assisted by the construction of new residential complexes in the city and its frazioni.

== Historic buildings ==
- Marian sanctuary of the Madonna of the Miracles
- Palazzo Brentano
