= Pietro Francesco Caccialupi =

Italian painter

Pietro Francesco Caccialupi (Pizzighettone, 1735 – April 19, 1814) was an Italian painter.

He moved to Cremona as a boy, and trained under Giacomo Guerrini. He worked as a restorer, including of the "Multiplication of the Loaves" by Francesco Boccaccino in the refectory of the church of Sant'Abbondio of the Theatines. The painting was then transferred to the presbytery of Sant'Agata in Cremona.
