= Monument to Mosè Bianchi =

Monument in Monza, Italy

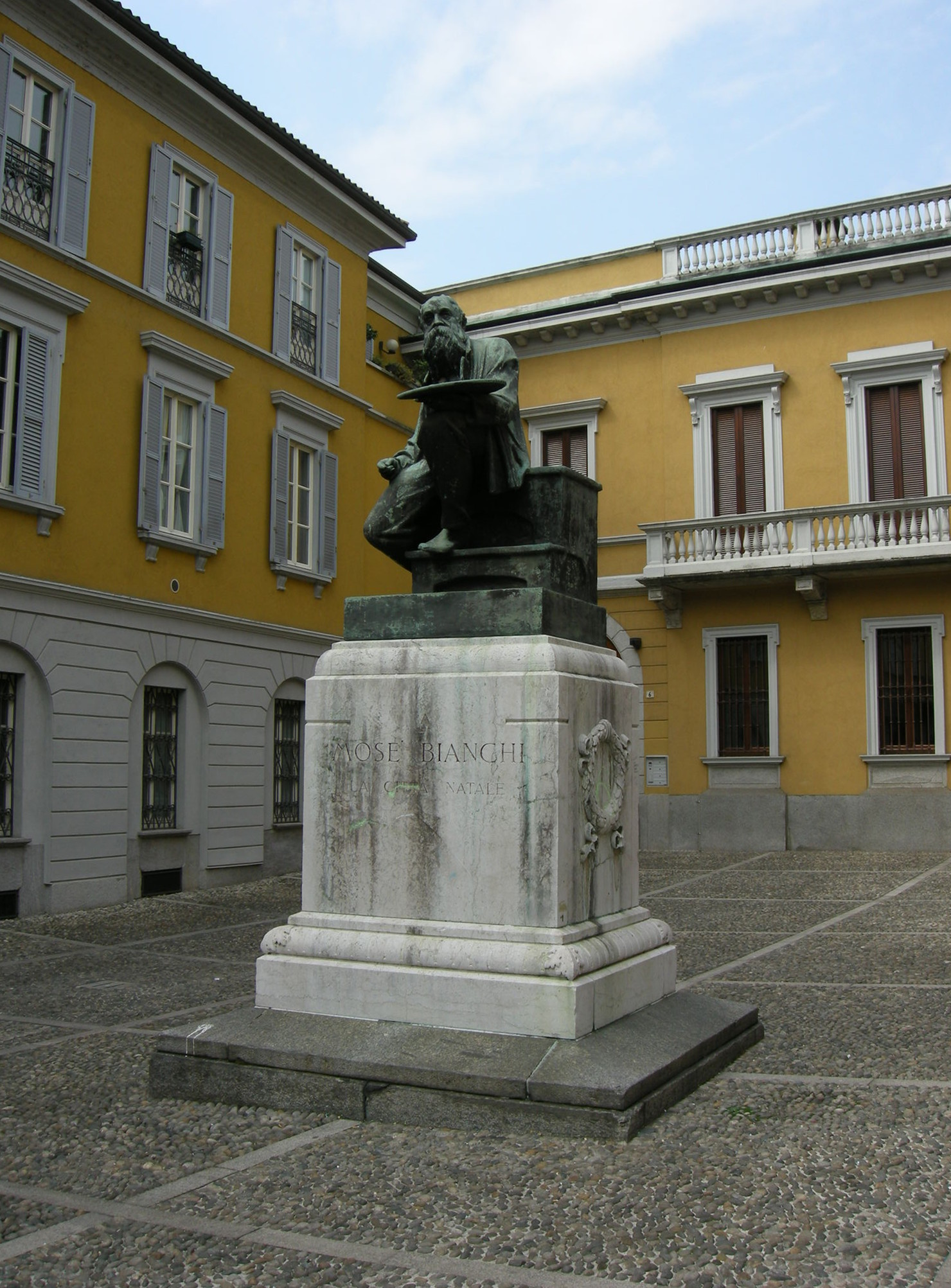
- Monument to Mosè Bianchi, Monza
- Interactive map of Monument to Mosè Bianchi
- Location: Piazza di Pietro, Monza, Lombardy, Italy
- Coordinates: 45°35′11″N 9°16′32″E
- Designer: Luigi Secchi
- Type: Monument
- Material: Bronze
- Dedicated date: April 4, 1927
- Dedicated to: Mosè Bianchi

The Monument to Mosè Bianchi is a bronze statue of the painter Mosè Bianchi that stands on the Piazza di Pietro in Monza, region of Lombardy, Italy.

== History ==
The sculptor Luigi Secchi, a close friend of the painter, was commissioned to create the monument, but only made the model. After the sculptor's death in 1921, thanks to a petition created by his student, Piero Da Verno, the statue was erected. The monument was unveiled on April 4, 1927. The statue depicts Bianchi, sitting with a palette in one hand.

In April 2023 two months of restoration works were carried out on the statue. The statue had to be mechanically and chemically cleaned, to remove years of grime from the bronze and stone sections of the statue.
