= Giacomo Guerrini =

Italian painter

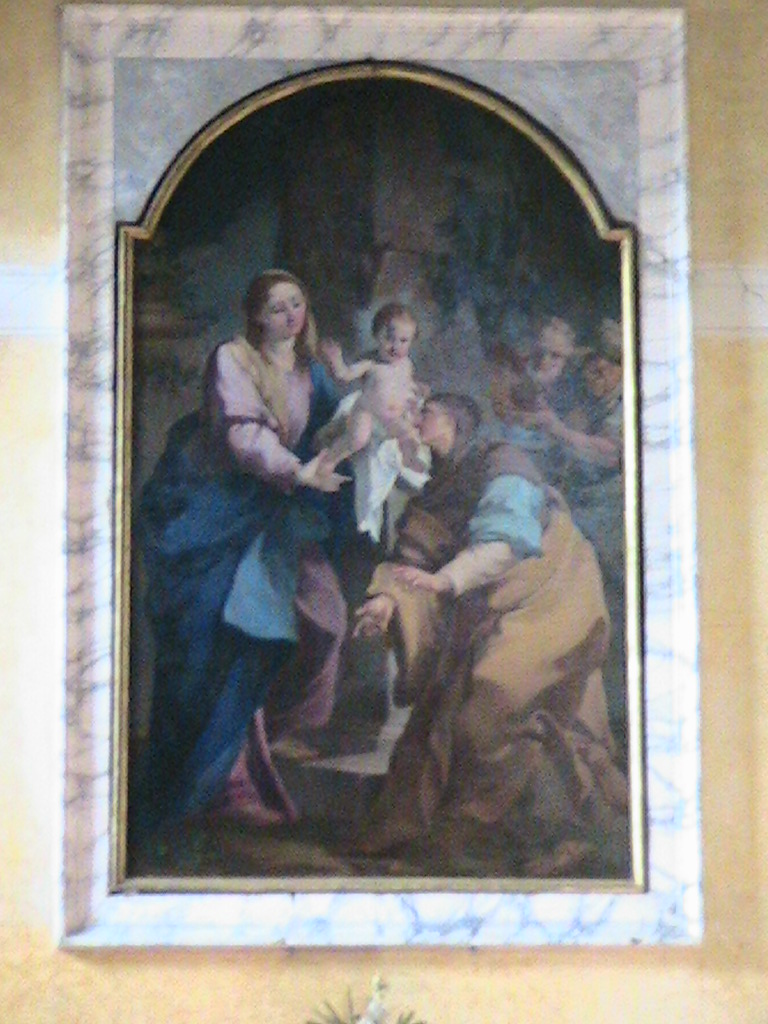
Canvas by Giacomo Guerrini in the parish church of Santa Maria Assunta

Giacomo Guerrini was an Italian painter of the late-Baroque period, active mainly in his natal city of Cremona. Giacomo Guerrini was also the original name of Mino Guerrini, a twentieth century media figure.

== Biography ==
Guerrini was a pupil of Francesco Boccacino. He painted a Decollation of St John the Baptist for the Oratory of San Girolamo in Cremona. In 1746, he painted a History of a Franciscan Saint for the convent of San Pietro in Cremona. In 1747, he painted five saints for the parish church of Paderno Ponchielli, and a sipario (theater curtain), now lost, for the Teatro Concordia (now Ponchielli). In 1752, he painted La sposa dei cantici and Moses restores the waters of the Red sea, now in the church of San Leonardo of Casalmaggiore. In 1755–1765, he painted for the church of San Martino del Lago, including a Glory of St Agatha . In the 1780s he painted for the Cavalcabo chapel in Sant'Agostino in Cremona. he also painted for the Palazzo Affaitati in Cremona.

He trained Giovanni Battista Beltrami, brother of Antonio Beltrami and Francesco Darosio.
