= Luca Guercilena =

Italian cycling administrator

Personal information
- Born: 4 August 1973 (age 53) Cassinetta di Lugagnano

Cycling career
- Sport: Cycling
- Current team: Lidl–Trek (men); Lidl–Trek (women)
- Discipline: Road
- Role: General manager; Directeur sportif (former); Team manager (former)

Managerial teams
- 2002: Mapei–Quick-Step
- 2003–2010: Quick-Step–Davitamon
- 2011–: Leopard Trek (men)
- 2019–: Trek–Segafredo (women)

Luca Guercilena (born 4 August 1973 in Cassinetta di Lugagnano) is the general manager for men's UCI WorldTeam Lidl–Trek, and UCI Women's WorldTeam Lidl–Trek.
