= Borri =

Borri is a surname of Italian origin, born particularly in Italy, by an ancient Milanese and Parmesan family, related to the Visconti. Notable people with the surname include:

- Bonacossa Borri, also known as Bonaca, or Bonaccossi Bonacosta (1254–1321), Lady of Milan
- Christoforo Borri, also called Christopher Borrus (1583–1632), Italian Jesuit missionary in Vietnam, mathematician, and astronomer
- Francesca Borri (born 1980), Italian journalist and writer
- Giuseppe Francesco Borri (1627–1695), Italian alchemist, prophet and doctor
- Joe Borri (born 1962), American artist and writer
- Paola Borri, Italian physicist
- Squarcino Borri, also called Scarsini (1230–1277), Italian condottiero and lord of the lands of Santo Stefano Ticino
