= Sanctuary of the Madonna of Miracles (Corbetta) =

Church in Corbetta, Italy

Sanctuary of Madonna of Miracles
- Santuario della Madonna dei Miracoli (Corbetta)
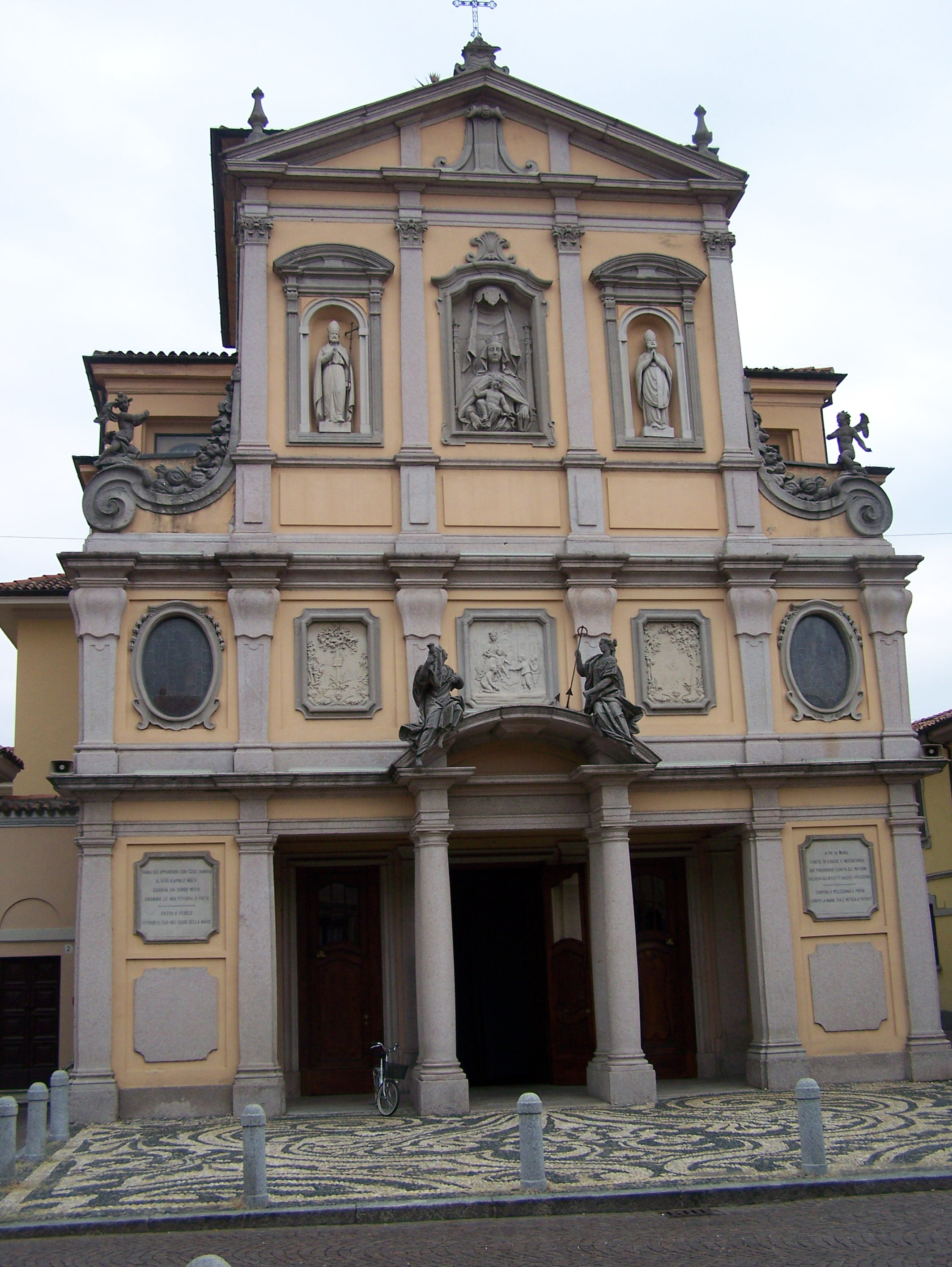
- Façade of the sanctuary of Madonna of Miracles

Religion
- Province: Milan
- Region: Lombardy

Location
- Location: Corbetta, Italy
- State: Italy
- Interactive map of Sanctuary of Madonna of Miracles
- Territory: Corbetta
- Coordinates: 45.280473°N 08.551358°E

Architecture
- Style: Baroque-Renaissance style

The Sanctuary of Madonna of Miracles (known officially as archiepiscopal sanctuary of Madonna of Miracles or properly archiepiscopal sanctuary of Madonna of Miracles in Saint Nicholas) is a Roman Catholic Marian sanctuary located in Corbetta, province of Milan, Lombardy, Italy. The sanctuary is dedicated to the Madonna of the Miracles, whose miraculous frescoed image, known as Madonna di Corbetta, was declared in 1955 to be the patron of the Magentino area in 1955 by the then archbishop of Milan and future pope Paul VI.

== History ==
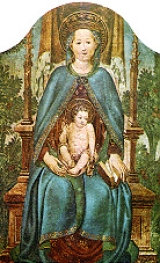
The miraculous image of the Madonna di Corbetta.

The present sanctuary was built at the site of a small church dedicated to San Nicolao. The impetus for the sanctuary was a putative miraculous vision that occurred to three children on 17 April 1555. That day, the first Thursday after Easter, in the small square in front of San Nicolao (the old church is now located in the lower part of the sanctuary) three children, Cesare della Stampino, Antonio della Torre and his congenitally deaf mute brother Giovanni Angelo (called Novello), were playing at bowls under the painting of the Madonna and Child frescoed on the church facade. Giovanni Angelo, suddenly and miraculously reacquired hearing and speech, and signaled his companions the vision of the Child Jesus, who had descended from the fresco to join the game. The Madonna also descended to gather her Son and returned to the fresco.

Soon, faithful pilgrims to the site reported other miracles, documented in the archives of the sanctuary, and whose stories are displayed inside the Cappella delle Benedizioni (Chapel of the Blessings), among hundreds of traditional votive offerings. The site drew numerous devotees and prompted the construction of the larger and embellished sanctuary, including decorations by Francesco Croce, Fabio Mangone, Vincenzo Seregni, Francesco Pessina, Carlo Francesco Nuvolone, Giulio Cesare Procaccini, Giovanni Battista Discepoli, Mosé Bianchi, Luigi Pellegrini Scaramuccia.

The miraculous fresco is now displayed in upper sanctuary, enclosed in a glass case, still on the original wall where it was painted by Gregorio de' Zavattari in 1475.

From 1913 the sanctuary was recognized "Building of national monumental interest".
Restorations were performed between 1948 and 1955, during which ancient decorations and frescoes of the sixteenth century were brought to light, and the cardinal Alfredo Ildefonso Schuster (1880-1954) proposed reconsecrating the sanctuary. Reconsecration took place on the fourth centenary of the original miracle (April 17, 1955), in a ceremony led by the then newly-appointed archbishop of Milan Giovanni Battista Montini, later Pope Paul VI, who crowned the frescoed image proclaiming her "Blessed Virgin of the miracles venerated in the sanctuary of Corbetta, patron saint of the area".

The sanctuary's museum, located in the upper rooms of the cloister adjacent to the church, houses numerous works of art and artifacts, including the Chamber of San Carlo, the room where Saint Charles Borromeo stayed during a 16th-century visit to Corbetta. The room, consisting of a four-poster bed, some furniture and vestments belonging to the archbishop, was once in the Villa Frisiani Mereghetti where a memorial plaque is still displayed. Cardinal Borromeo recalled in his chronicles, "... there was not a palace suitable to host such a great personality and as such the only one was found in the house of the Most Excellency Mr. Dom. Frisiani ... "

The Confraternity of the Holy Rosary is linked to the archiepiscopal sanctuary of the Beata Vergine dei Miracoli.

=== The "Perdono of Corbetta" ===
In 31 August 1562, Pope Pius IV, prodded by his nephew, then archbishop of Milan, Saint Charles Borromeo, put forth in the bull Unigeniti Filii Dei, a grant extraordinary plenary indulgence in jubilee form to all those faithful who, spiritually disposed, showed devotion before the sacred image of the Madonna of Corbetta. This exclusive privilege, of course, increased the number of pilgrims visiting this church. Charles Borromeo himself during a pilgrimage to pray before the Shroud of Turin revisited Corbetta.

== The architecture ==
=== The church before the miracle ===
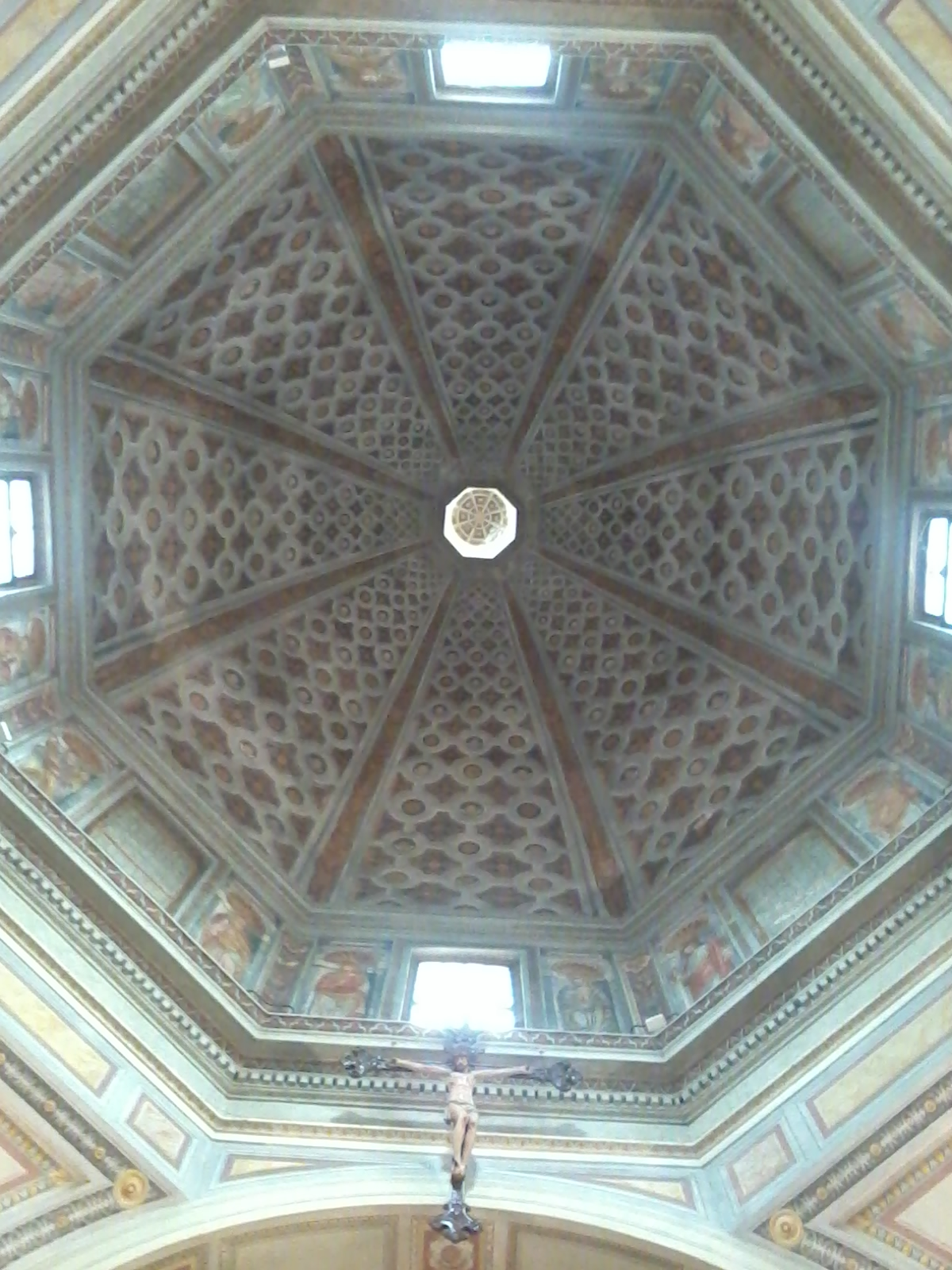
Dome of the lower sanctuary of San Nicolau

The original oratory to San Nicolao had been documented since the mid -13th century, but after the miracle was completely rebuilt in Renaissance style, being completed with an ambitious octagonal drum dome that still remains. The original Romanesque facade had been frescoed by Gregorio Zavattari with the Madonna di Corbetto in 1475. The church then was located just outside the fortified walls of the city of Corbetta, in an area surrounded by woods.

=== The primitive upper sanctuary ===
After the miraculous event that in 1555 had interested precisely the church of Saint Nicholas, an administrative committee was set up with the purpose of protecting the sanctuary, which in a very short time became a place of worship and pilgrimage.

This first chapter consisted essentially of the nobles of the village and was governed on behalf of the collegiate Corbetta by the canon Ambrogio Spanzotta who in 1556, for fear that the painting of the miracle could be damaged over time (given also the position in which found, exposed to the elements and negligence of the weather), he first proposed to remove the fresco to bring it inside the church, on the main altar. However, since this operation was cumbersome and problematic for the protection of the painting itself, it was concluded that a chapel should be built for a new sanctuary, which would rest directly on the façade of the church.

For the realization of this project it became necessary the erection of a portico in the lower part of the church that served as an atrium to the already existing one, and in the upper part it became obvious the construction of a small chapel that appeared very small (about 6 x 4, 80 meters), whose vault was decorated with frescoes executed by Francesco Pessina. It was possible to access it through a small staircase built inside the lower church of Saint Nicholas (where today the chapel of the Crucifix is located).

Judged unsuitable to contain the ever-increasing number of believers who came to visit the sacred image, in 1574 it was agreed on the need to expand this same chapel on the design of the architect Vincenzo Seregni, who also added a ladder to the north to facilitate the descent of visitors.

=== Extension works of the church of Saint Nicholas ===
In 1556, just one year after the miracle, it was decided to expand the already existing structure in order to better accommodate the functions and the ever increasing number of faithful who were presenting themselves to Corbetta. It was thus that the already described chapter, thanks to his own contributions and to the offers received from the faithful, decided to buy the land behind the apse of the church, so as to build a choir, moving the high altar in a more retreated position from the moment that previously this stood under the dome. These works are still remembered today by a plaque epigraph found in the choir of the church itself.

=== Extensions of the seventeenth century ===
At the beginning of the seventeenth century, the outside walls were covered with marble dust, and a larger wooden staircase was added to allow access to the upper part of the sanctuary. Inside, the flooring is made by Cristoforo Alemani who also decides to raise the main altar through marble decorations still visible today and the realization of the inlaid works that represent the coat of arms of Pius IV (which granted the Bolla del Perdono to the Corbettese sanctuary) and that of Saint Charles Borromeo in perpendicular to the dome.

At this time a wooden high altar was carved by Giulio Mangone and gilded by a certain "mastro Celidonio Aquino"; today there are only two praying angels of this work that are found at one time on the sides of the main altar where there is still an ancóna representing St. Nicholas and dates back to 1616.

In those same years Fabio Mangone, an architect for Milan's cathedral, was called to ensure solidity to the dome that threatened to collapse, while also executing drawings for the execution of the marble balustrade that precedes the access to the main altar, which was built in 1620 by the sculptors Giovanni Domenico Vigna and Giovanni Morelli. Furthermore, Mangone was also responsible for designing the façade of the sanctuary, which however the plague of 1630 and the poor economic conditions of the time set aside, leaving a single testimony to the project presented to the parish and kept in the Archives of the Sanctuary.

In those years an imposing marble staircase was erected in 1690, leading from the square in front of the church (where the cemetery was once located), reached the upper chapel from the outside, along the side of the building, also occupying the current square Pio IV. On the upper chapel of this era, it is known that it had light from a large window in the shape of a niche at the center of the façade, right in front of the fresco of the Madonna which was initially protected by a curtain and then by a reliquary crystal (1706).

=== The eighteenth-century fervor: works at the upper sanctuary (1743-1750) ===
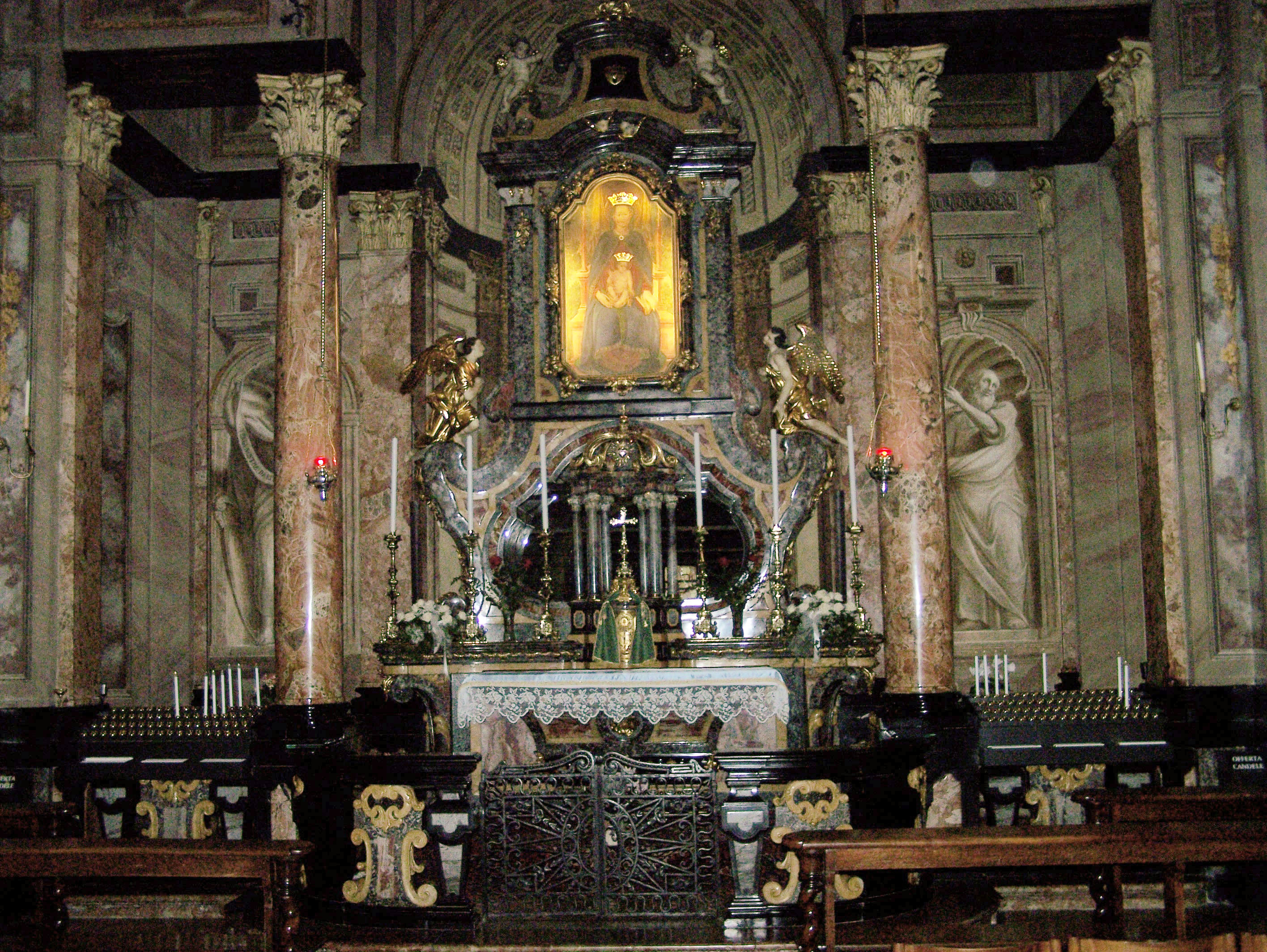
The eighteenth-century rococo altar of the upper sanctuary with the miraculous image painted by Gregorio Zavattari in 1475.

The eighteenth century was the period of greatest activity in the construction and decoration of the sanctuary. In 1733 the rebuilding and enlargement of the upper chapel was completed, but took place thanks to a delegation only in 1736 thanks to the influence of local nobles Filippo Archinto, Francesco Maria del Maino and Giuseppe Brentano. Brentano will propose to contact for the works the famous architect Francesco Croce who was already working at his palace (Palazzo Brentano) in Corbetta. It will be Croce who proposes to move the fresco headquarters and to design a new high altar to welcome painting, but fortunately in 1740 the same chapter, not very convinced, decided to call the architect Donnino Riccardi who proposed to leave the fresco in its original position, raising it only slightly to place it in the center of the new upper sanctuary.

The Croce will instead completed the two side staircases that still allow the entrance to the upper part of the sanctuary, adding also new marble decorations then executed by the sculptor Carlo Nava, in addition to the elaborate rococo altar realized in black marble and golden bronze from Carlo Antonio Pozzi. The façade was entirely redesigned by Croce and is up to the second order as it was conceived in the eighteenth century, or with a central statue depicting the Madonna with Child made by Angelo Maria Beretta around 1750 and transported from the construction site through the Naviglio Grande up to Robecco sul Naviglio and then from there to Corbetta by means of a cart. Also from Croce, the balustrade of the main altar is rebuilt, which is entirely offered by Carlo Brentano, son of the late count Giuseppe, who will also pay the square of the small square in front of the church.

In 1775 the interior of the sanctuary was frescoed by the quadraturist Giuseppe Reina and Giovanni Battista Perabò (who populated the frescoes). The frescoes in the center of the dome of the new upper chapel depicting the Assumption of the Virgin, together with the Four primary virtues of Mary in the corners, in addition to the Eight main mysteries of the life of the Madonna in the lateral areas of the intercolumni, monochrome paintings. Other niches of fake architecture include four painted statues depicting Isaiah, David, Judith and Ester announcing the coming of the Messiah, as well as numerous Marian symbols. Perabò also painted the very famous fresco in front of the one depicting the miraculous event, while the mosaic floor was made in 1868 by Davide Macchi.

=== Works of the nineteenth century ===
In the nineteenth century the attention moved again to the lower church of San Nicola where the seventeenth-century altar was replaced with a new project dating back to 1820-1822 by Luigi Tantardini and Gioachino Cenchione based on drawings by Luigi Rovida. As for the dome, it had been whitewashed already in the seventeenth century by a cholera epidemic, and was redecorated entirely in 1874 by Mosé Bianchi with the figures of the four evangelists and the eternal father above the altar, torn from their headquarters after the restoration of 1950 brought to light the underlying renaissance frescoes. These paintings are now kept in the sanctuary museum.

In 1824, by the rector Francesco Porroni, there was installed a Prestinari organ, restored between 1874 and 1875 by Giuseppe Prestinari, according to the suggestions of the well-known organist Giuseppe Della Valley. The organ was removed during the restoration of the church in the 1950s.

== Bibliography ==
- Cazzani Eugenio, Archivio Plebano di Corbetta, Edizione Olona, Saronno, 1976.
- Prada Luciano, Città di Corbetta 1989, Amministrazione comunale di Corbetta, tipolitografia Crespi, Vittuone, 1989.
- Caronni Giancarlo e Rimonta Daniela, Il Santuario di Corbetta, Amilcare Pizzi ed., Cinisello Balsamo, 1995. ISBN 88-85153-01-1.
- Aina Livio, 'Ndèm dònn - quando a Corbetta parlavano le campane, ed. Zeisciu, Corbetta, 2004. ISBN 88-87405-09-3.
- Balzarotti Andrea, Castellazzo de' Stampi - Volti di un borgo tra storia e natura, Amministrazione comunale di Corbetta, tipolitografia Crespi, Corbetta, 2008.
- Mario Comincini (a cura di), Per grazia della Vergine. Miracoli e miracolismo nell'antica pieve di Corbetta, ed. InCuriaPicta, 2008.
- Balzarotti Andrea, Tesori nascosti del Santuario Arcivescovile della Beata Vergine dei Miracoli di Corbetta, Corbetta, 2011.
