= Dunkermotoren =

German company

Dunkermotoren GmbH
- Company type: Ltd.
- Industry: Electrical drive systems
- Founded: 1950 as Christian Dunker Präzisions-Kleinstmotoren, since 1963 GmbH
- Founder: Christian Dunker
- Defunct: 1966
- Headquarters: Bonndorf im Schwarzwald, Germany
- Key people: Uwe Lorenz
- Revenue: 205 Mio. Euro
- Number of employees: 1,200worldwide about 1.000 in Germany

Dunkermotoren GmbH is a German subsidiary of the American group Ametek in the division of "Advanced Motion Solutions" (AMS).

== Chronicle ==
In 1950 Christian Dunker founded the company Christian Dunker Präzisions-Kleinstmotoren in Bonn, Germany. In the following year he started the production with three employees. The company grew. In November 1955 the company moved to Bonndorf, Black Forest, and the company has a new name: Dunkermotoren. With trucks the productions facilities were transported to Bonndorf and some employees followed the resettlement of their workplace.

The former director Christian Dunker died in consequence of a car crash in 1966. So the company was acquired by Union Carbide. The Standard Elektik Lorenz stock company (SEL) from Stuttgart, Germany, took over Dunkermotoren in 1969. The planetary gearboxes were presented to the market in 1977 and the 4-phase brushless direct current motors were presented in 1985.

Alcatel-Lucent took over SEL in 1987, so Dunkermotoren was part of the Alcatel concern. In 1999 there is a launch of the brushless direct current motors with integrated electronics. The first motor with integrated PLC-feature was presented in 2007. A market survey from IMS Research called Dunkermotoren a global market leader in the range of brushless motors with integrated electronic in 2007 and 2015.

A new production facility opened up in Taicang, China, in 2007 and a Dunkermotoren office was founded in Crystal Lake, USA, a year later. Stefan Forster, director from the neighbor company Hectronic GmbH, and Nikolaus Graef, director from the company Dunkermotoren GmbH, signed the apprenticeship agreement for the apprenticeship-cooperation HeDu in 2009. From now on, the apprentices from both companies were educated together.

In 2009 the financial investor Triton took over Dunkermotoren. In 2011 a new production facility opened up in Subotica, Serbia. In the same year Dunkermotoren acquired the British manufacturer of linear drives Copley Motion Systems in Basildon.

In 2012 Triton sold Dunkermotoren to the american concern Ametek, Inc. Mid-2013 the three directors Nikolaus Graef, Volker Brunner and Frank Guckelberger resigned nearly at the same time. Subsequent the new directors Markus Roth and Uwe Lorenz took up the job. In 2014 the US-branch moved to Mount Prospect, Illinois, USA and the linear systems manufacturing moved from UK to Bonndorf, Germany, in 2014. In the same year Dunkermotoren opened up a competence center for venetian blind drives in Subotica, Serbien. At the beginning of the year 2016 the production area in Serbia was also expended by 900 m².

In June 2016 Uwe Lorenz got a new business task within the Ametek group at the sister company MAE in Robecco sul Naviglio near Milan. So Markus Roth managed the company alone. Since October 2017 Uwe Lorenz has managed Dunkermotoren with Matthew C. French who operates as an interim manager. He also works as Senior Vice President at Ametek.

== Products and performance ==
The main branches are Industrial Automation, Building Automation, Motive and Transportation, Basic Automation, Agriculture Healthcare and Lab. The product range includes:

- Brushless DC motors
- Brushed DC motors
- AC motors
- Stepper motors (MAE)
- Venetian blind drives
- Gearboxes (planetary gearboxes, Spirotec gearboxes, bevel gearboxes, hub gearboxes and worm gearboxes)
- Linear systems
- Controllers
- Brakes
- Encoder systems
- Blowers (MAE)
- System solutions
- Rotary and linear drive technology from 1 to 5000 Watt output power

MAE:

- Stepper motors
- Universal motors
- Brushless blowers

EGS Automation:

- Industrial robots
- palletizing systems
- Production automation

== Locations ==
In addition to the headquarters in Bonndorf, Germany, there are three other subsidiaries:

- Taicang, China
- Subotica, Serbien
- Mount Prospect, Illinois, USA

Dunkermotoren sales offices are spread around the globe.
