= Luigi Secchi =

Italian sculptor

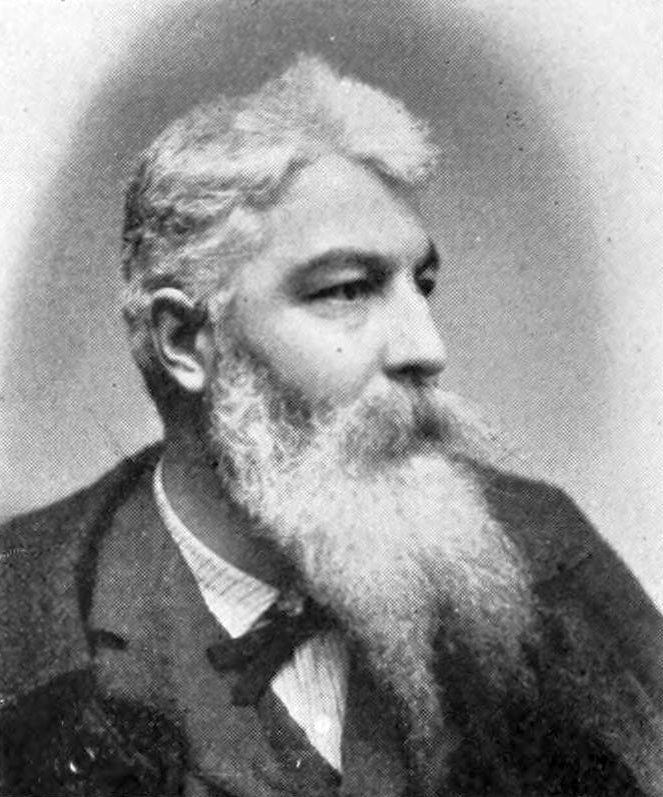
Luigi Secchi

Luigi Secchi (1853 in Cremona – 1921 in Miazzina) was an Italian sculptor.

== Biography ==
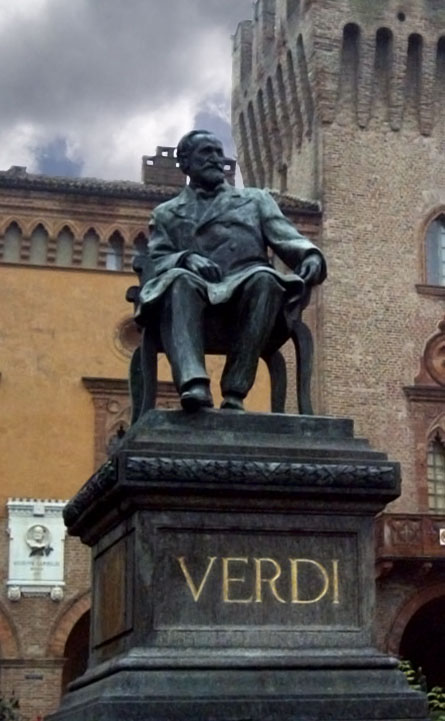
Statue of Giuseppe Verdi, (1913) in Busseto, Italy

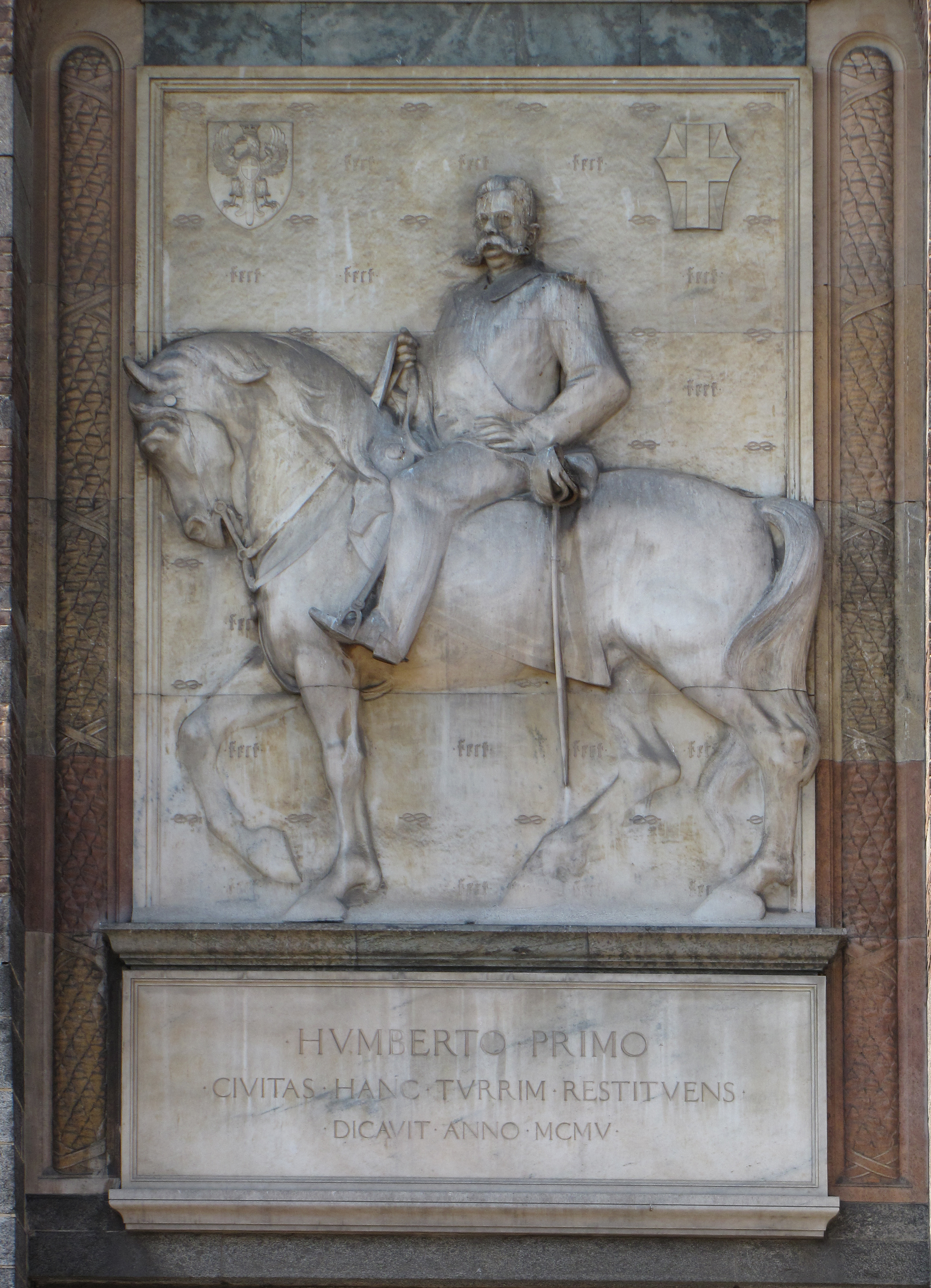
Monument to King Umberto I, (1905) above the entrance portal to Filarete's Tower in the Castello Sforzesco of Milan.

He was born in Cremona, but resided during his career mostly in Milan. He was initially a pupil of Pietro Magni, and then of Francesco Barzaghi at the Brera Academy.

He worked on statues in bronze and marble. He exhibited in 1883 in Milan a bronze statue titled: Modello in Riposo. His work Bel mattino was awarded at the 1883 Girotti competition. In 1884, in Turin, he exhibited a model for In Repose. In 1886, in Milan, he exhibited this statue in marble. He was commissioned to design a number of monuments in and around Milan. These include the Monument to the poet Giuseppe Parini, (1899) at Piazza Cordusio, Milan. The base was completed with Antonio Beltrami and inaugurated on the centenary of the writer's death. One of his masterworks is his monument to Verdi made for town where the composer lived.

== Gallery ==
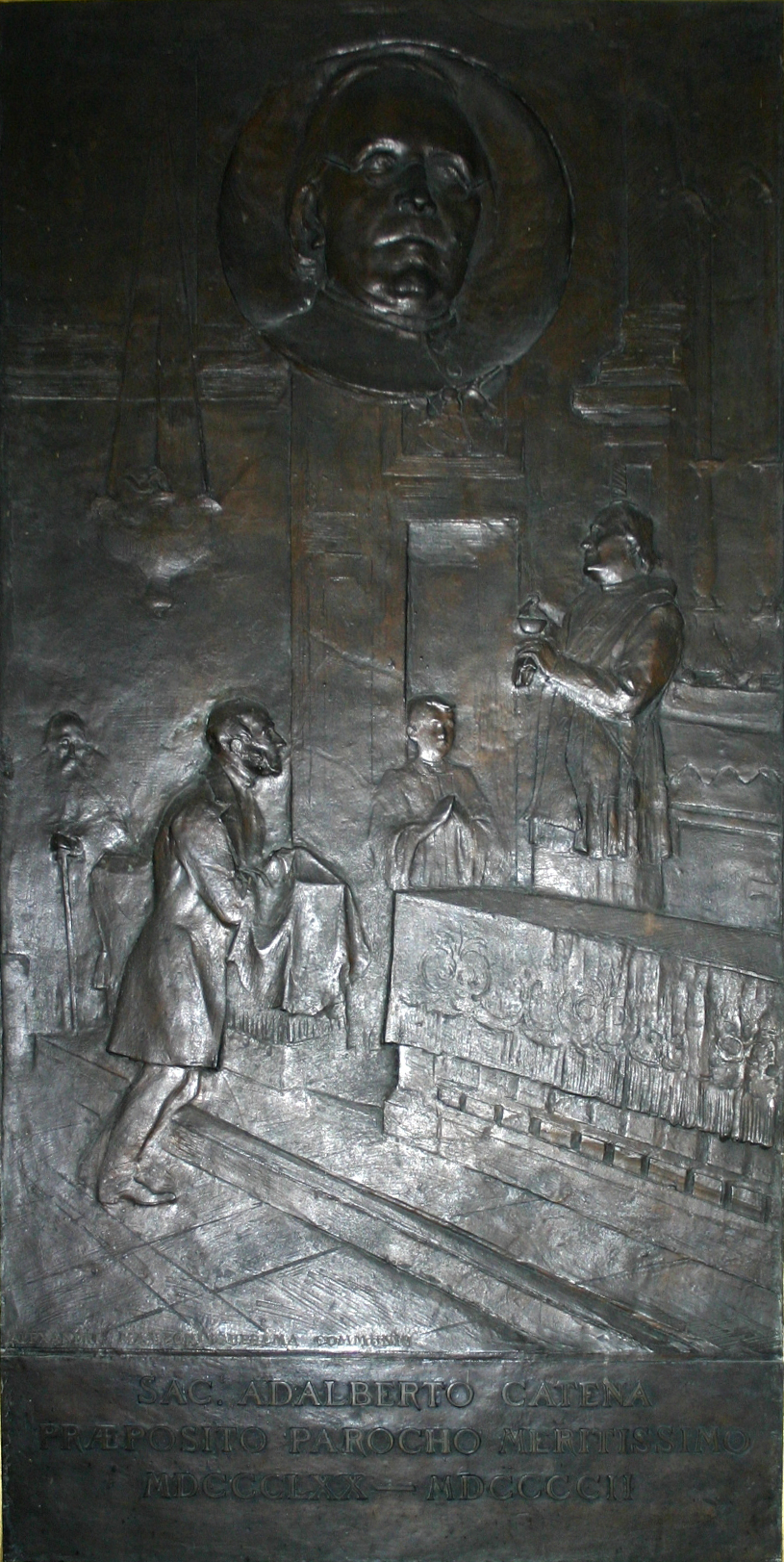
Last Communion of Manzoni, (1903) plaque in the Church of San Fedele, Milan

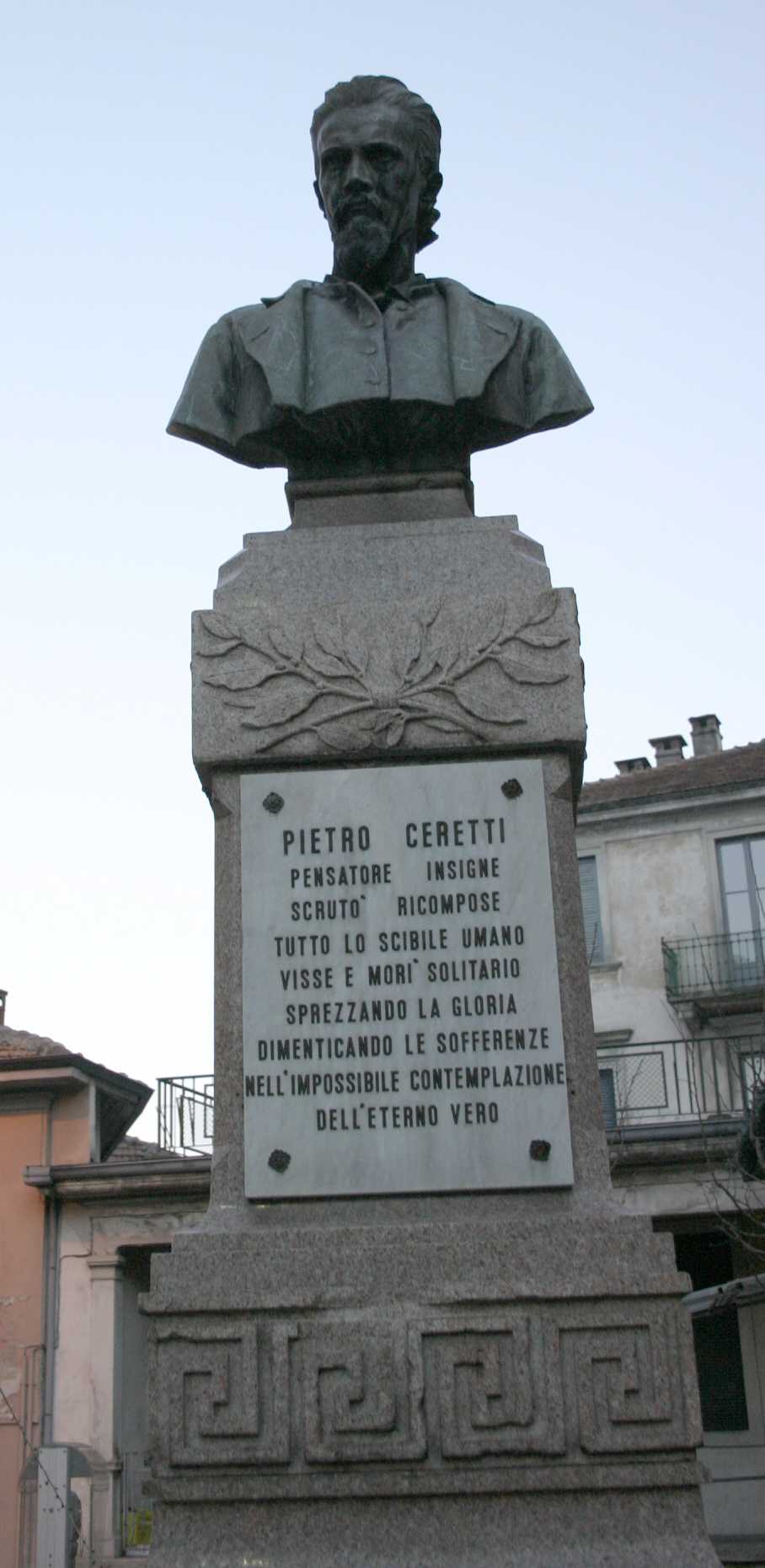
Monument to Pietro Ceretti (1895), in Verbania, Italy.

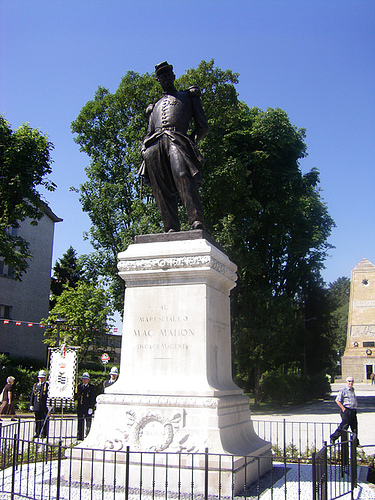
Monument to Patrice Edme Maurice de Mac Mahon (1895) in Magenta, Italy

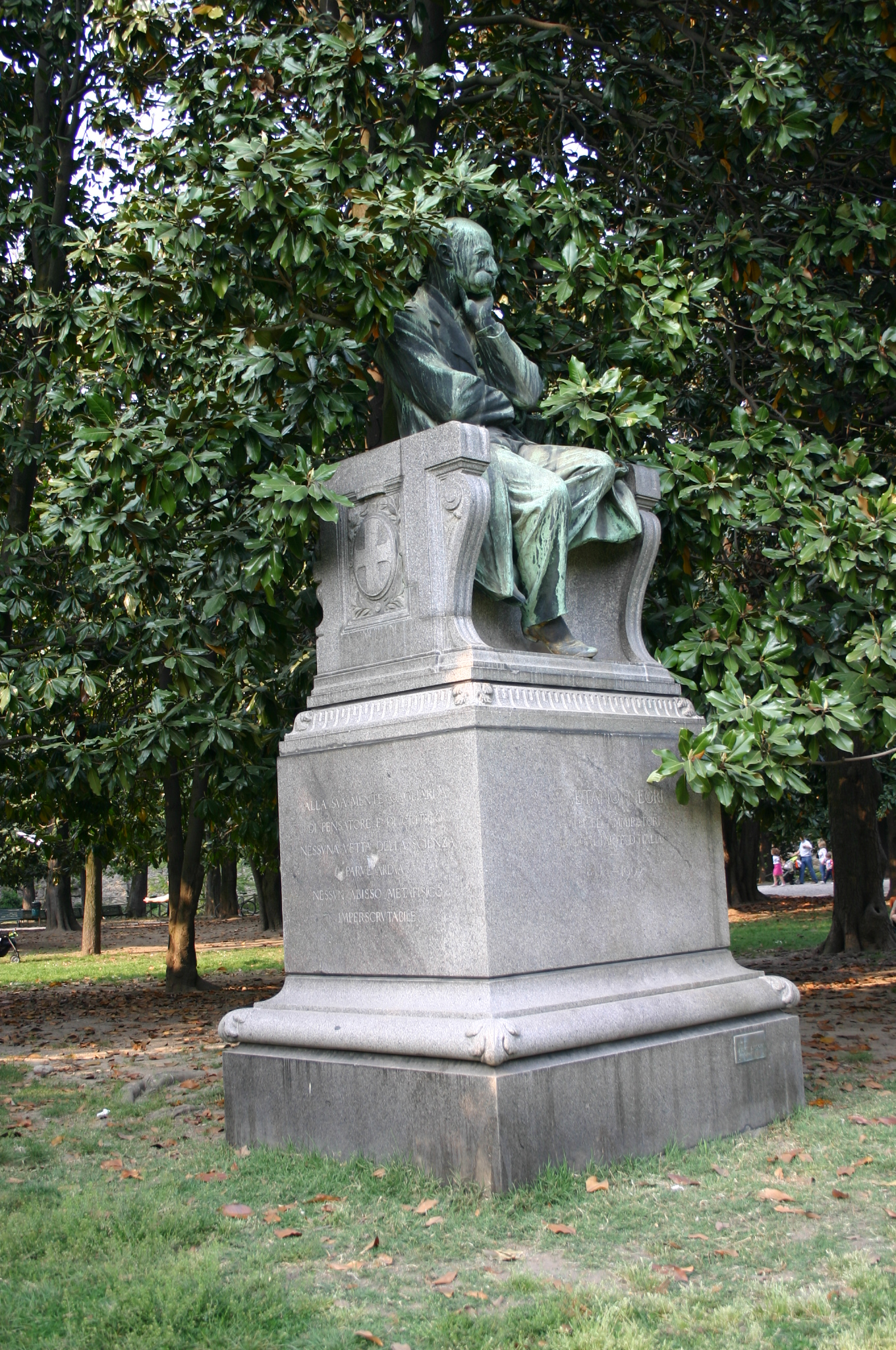
Monument to Gaetano Negri (1908).

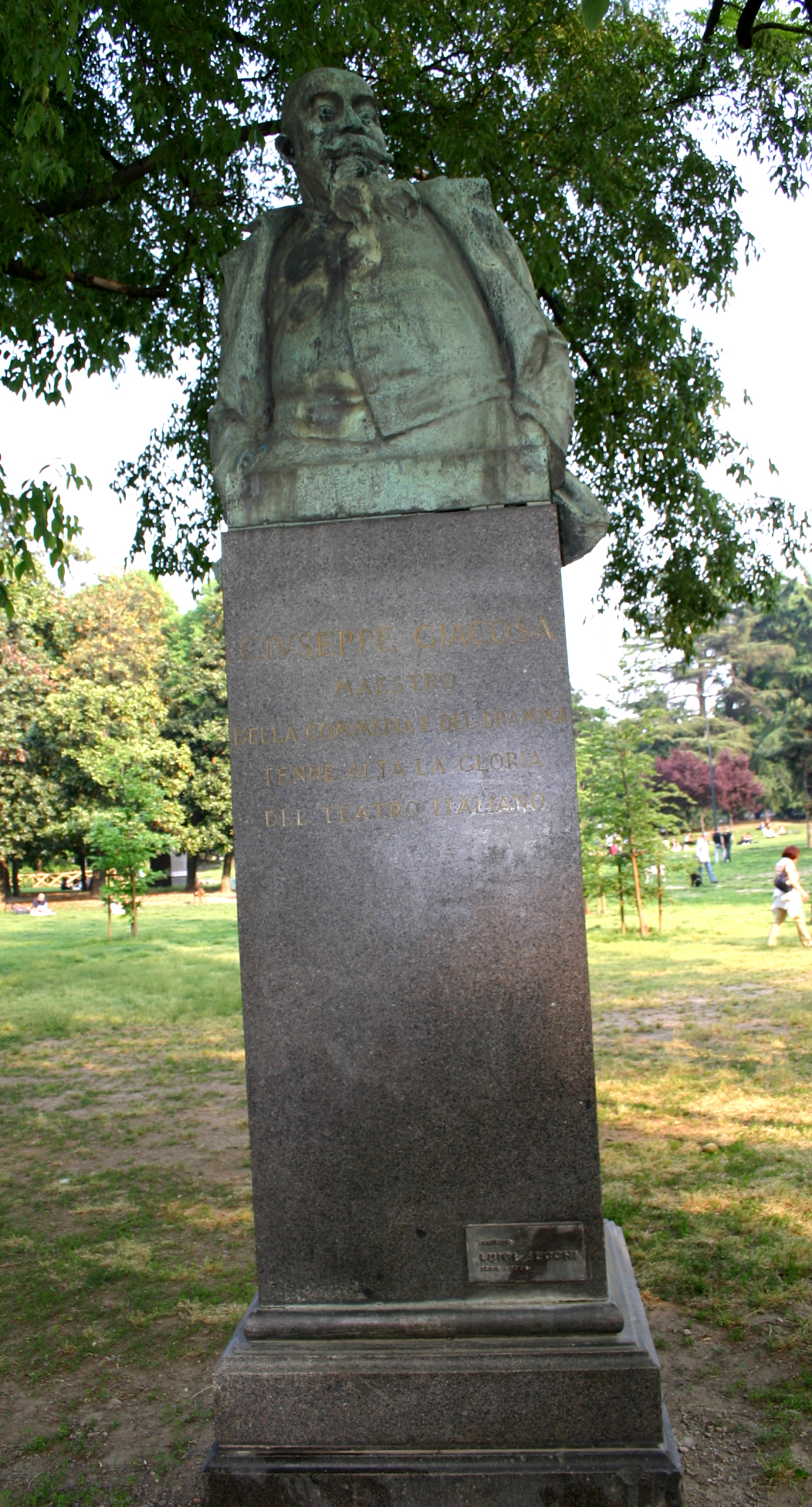
Monument to Giuseppe Giacosa (1910).
