= Francesco Darosio =

Italian painter

Francesco Darosio (1744 – 1788) was an Italian painter and engraver, active in Cremona and Rome.

== Biography ==
He was a pupil of Giacomo Guerrini in Cremona, and obtained a stipend to study in Rome.

He engraved a depiction of the frescoes in the walls of the Vatican library for the work of Augustinus Vairani called Cremonensium Monumenta Romae extantia. Darosio died poverty in the Hospital of San Carlo of Rome.
