= Albairate =

- Comune
- Comune di Albairate
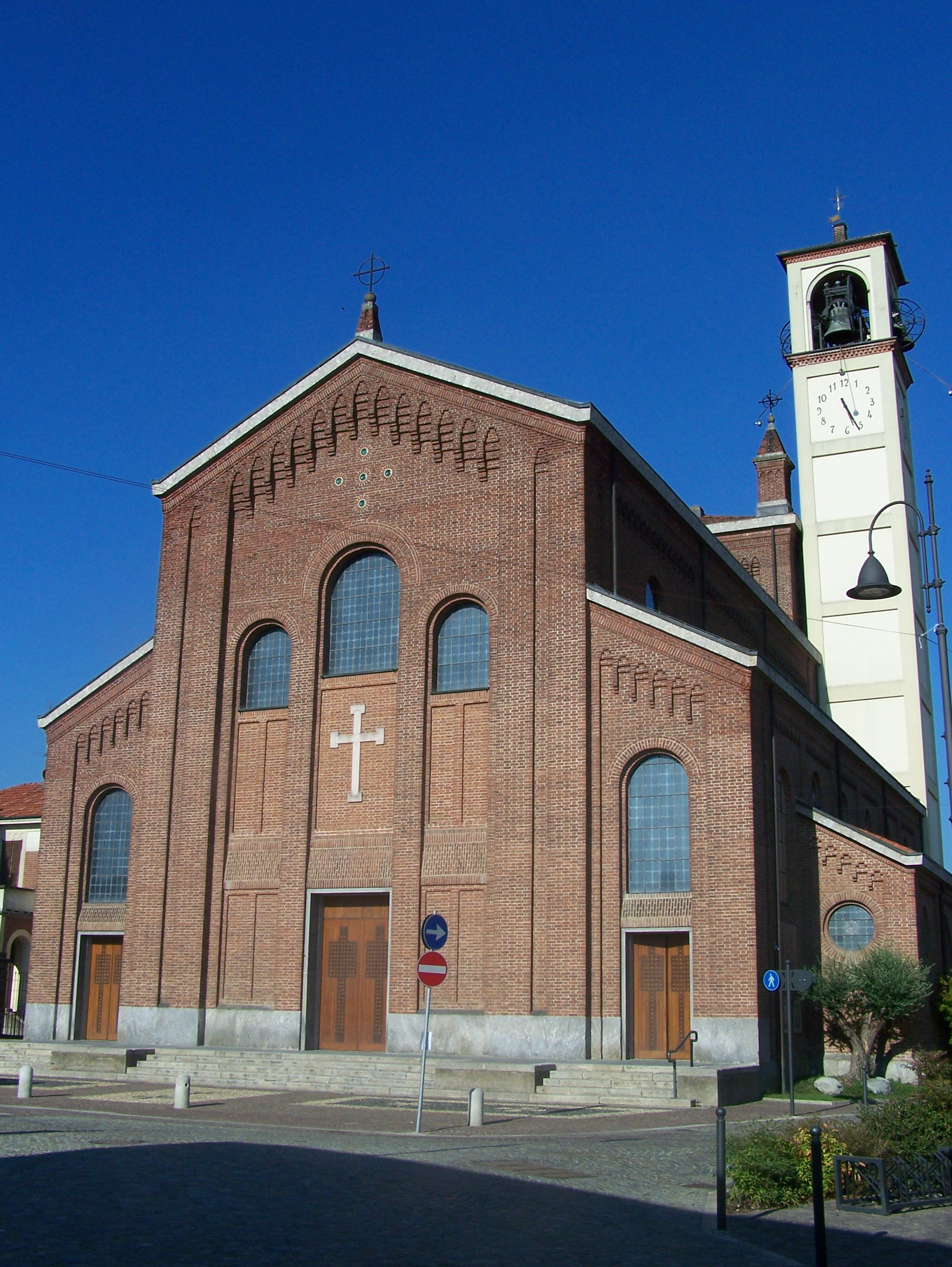
- Parish church of St. George.

- Coat of arms

- Location of Albairate in Italy Albairate (Lombardy)
- Coordinates: 45°25′N 8°56′E
- Country: Italy
- Region: Lombardy
- Metropolitan city: Milan (MI)

Government
  - Mayor: Fabio Crivellin

Area
  - Total: 15.0 km^{2} (5.8 sq mi)
- Elevation: 124 m (407 ft)

Population (30 November 2017)
  - Total: 4,710
  - Density: 314/km^{2} (813/sq mi)
- Demonym: Albairatesi
- Time zone: UTC+1 (CET)
  - Summer (DST): UTC+2 (CEST)
- Postal code: 20080
- Dialing code: 02
- Website: Official website

Albairate (Lombard: Bairaa or Albairaa [(al)bai̯ˈraː]) is a comune (municipality) in the Metropolitan City of Milan in the Italian region Lombardy, located about 20 kilometres (12 mi) southwest of Milan.

Albairate borders the following municipalities: Corbetta, Cisliano, Cassinetta di Lugagnano, Gaggiano, Abbiategrasso, and Vermezzo.

Albairate is served by Albairate-Vermezzo railway station.

== History ==
Archeological discoveries attesting to the presence of inhabitants in the area of Albairate date the first settlements to the Bronze Age, when the area was inhabited by the Ligurians.

Albairate is first mentioned in documents in 1054, as a fief of the Milanese monastery of San Vittore, as well as having property attributable to Milanese noble families. During the 13th century, the process of the town being released from vassalage and instituted as a proper rural comune took place. It later passed, along with the rest of Milanese territory, under the rule of the Visconti and then the Sforza.

On April 5, 1570, Cardinal Carlo Borromeo, Archbishop of Milan, paid a visit to Albairate stimulating a spiritual renewal of the parish and starting the social development of the country.

The city was part of the Duchy of Milan and later the Kingdom of Lombardy–Venetia prior to Italian unification bringing it into the Kingdom of Italy.
