= Emilio Borsa =

Italian painter

Emilio Borsa (1857–1931) was an Italian painter of genre and landscape scenes, as well as a portraitist.

He was born in Monza. His father, Paolo Borsa, was a professor of Design in Milan. He initially trained with his uncle Mosè Bianchi, then studied at the Brera Academy, and finally moved to Rome. His mother was the aunt of Pompeo Mariani. At the 1883 Roman Exposition, he displayed In Giardino, Buon Core, and the Il Palazzo Reale di Monza. At the 1887 Venetian Exhibition, he displayed: Bosco; Amor riscalda; Ottobre; Primavera; La quiete del lago; and a portrait. He also displayed works at the 1907 International Exhibition in Venice.

== See also ==
- Mosè Bianchi
- Pompeo Mariani
