= Cassinetta di Lugagnano =

- Comune
- Comune di Cassinetta di Lugagnano
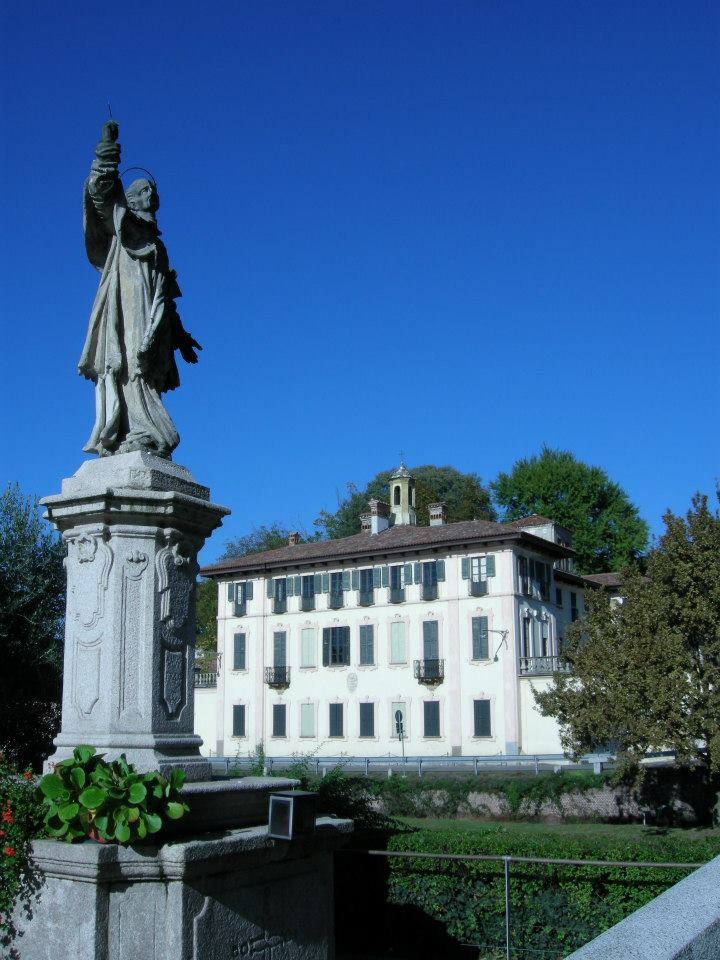
- Statue of St. Charles Borromeo and Villa Visconti Maineri.

- Coat of arms

- Location within Italy Location within Lombardy
- Coordinates: 45°26′N 8°55′E
- Country: Italy
- Region: Lombardy
- Metropolitan city: Milan (MI)

Government
  - Mayor: Michele Bona

Area
  - Total: 3.3 km^{2} (1.3 sq mi)
- Elevation: 125 m (410 ft)

Population (31 January 2017)
  - Total: 1,898
  - Density: 580/km^{2} (1,500/sq mi)
- Demonym: Cassinettesi
- Time zone: UTC+1 (CET)
  - Summer (DST): UTC+2 (CEST)
- Postal code: 20081
- Dialing code: 02
- Website: Official website

Cassinetta di Lugagnano (Lombard: Cassinetta de Lugagnan [kasiˈnɛta de lyɡaˈɲãː]) is a comune (municipality) in the Metropolitan City of Milan in the Italian region Lombardy, about 20 kilometres (12 mi) west of Milan. It borders the municipalities of Corbetta, Robecco sul Naviglio, Albairate and Abbiategrasso. It is one of I Borghi più belli d'Italia ("The most beautiful villages of Italy").
