= Mosè Bianchi =

Italian painter (1840–1904)

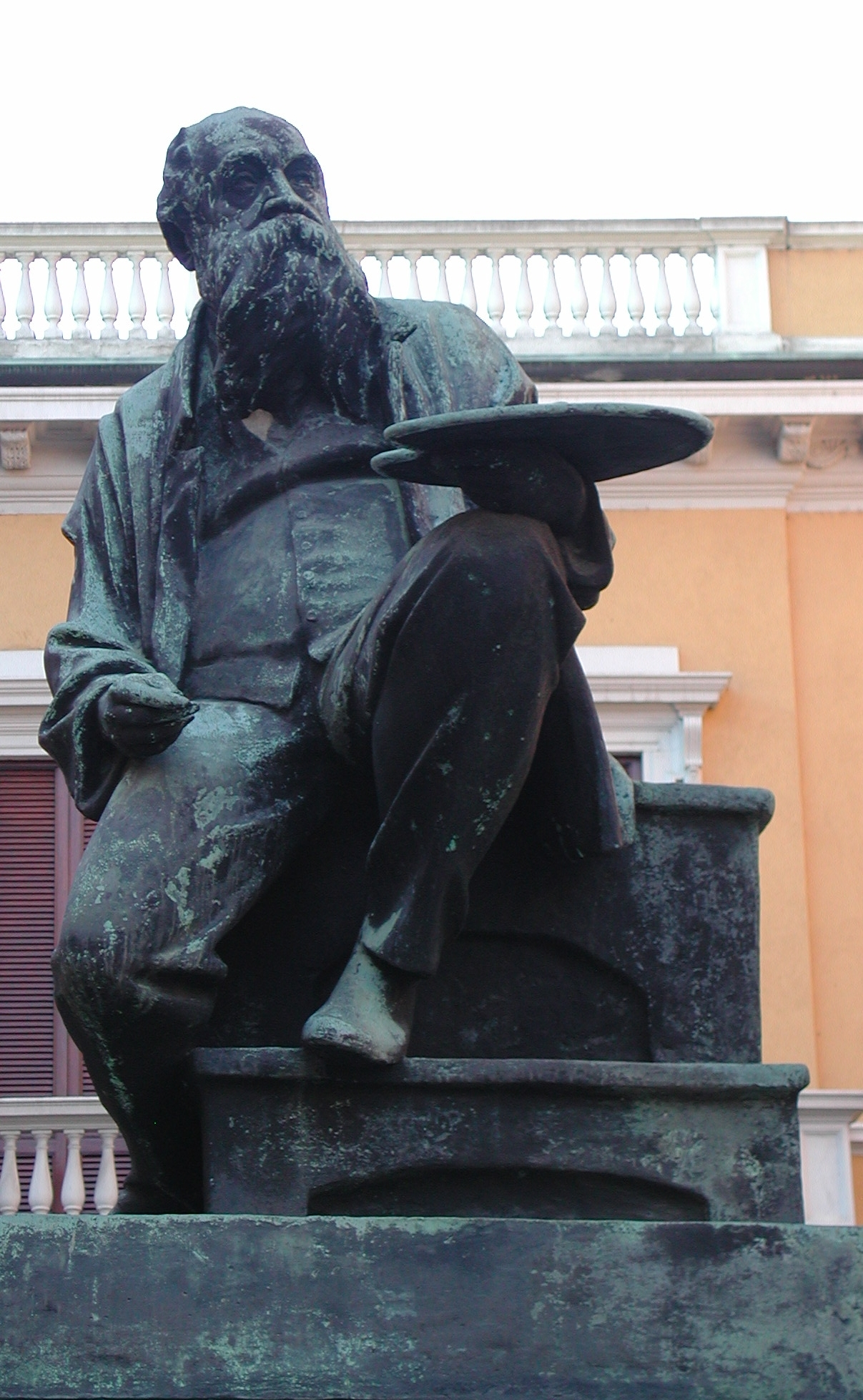
- Monument to Mosè Bianchi in Monza
- Born: 13 October 1840; Monza, Kingdom of Lombardy–Venetia
- Died: 15 March 1904 (aged 63); Milan, Kingdom of Italy
- Known for: Historical and genre painting
- Movement: Scapigliatura

Mosè Bianchi (13 October 1840 – 15 March 1904) was an Italian painter and printmaker.

== Biography ==
The son of Giosuè Bianchi (1806–1875), a painter of portraits and religious subjects in the academic style, he enrolled at the Brera Academy, Milan, in 1856. In 1859 he temporarily abandoned his studies to fight in the second Italian War of Independence, returning to Milan to study under Giuseppe Bertini. Among his fellow pupils was Tranquillo Cremona, whose involvement with the Scapigliati later had an impact on Bianchi's work.

In 1862 Bianchi exhibited his first large-scale, independently executed work, the history painting the Priest Stefano Guandeca Accusing the Archbishop of Milan, Anselmo Pusterla, of Sacrilegious Betrayal (1862; priv. col.). He continued to exhibit regularly and in 1866 he was awarded the Pensionato Oggioni for his Conversion of St. Paul (1866; priv. col.), which enabled him to visit Venice, Paris and Rome. During this period Bianchi met the artists Mariano Fortuny y Marsal and Ernest Meissonier, and the dealer Goupil, who inspired him to produce a series of 18th-century genre scenes such as Leaving for the Duel (1866; Galleria d'Arte Moderna, Milan).

Eighteenth-century influences, especially the work of Giovanni Battista Tiepolo, were also important for his many fresco cycles, starting with those in the Villa Giovanelli in Lonigo in the Veneto (1870). Bianchi continued to attract attention with his views of Chioggia and Milan, these frequently providing the background for genre scenes (e.g. Porto di San Felice at Chioggia, 1885; Milan, Sforza Castle).

Bianchi took part with some success at the Brera exhibitions and the Vienna Exhibition of 1873. It was in this period that he began to paint genre scenes in 18th-century settings and numerous portraits, soon becoming one of the artists most in demand with the Milanese middle classes.

In 1890 Bianchi extended his interest to rural scenes, following Eugenio Gignous and visiting Gignese on Lake Maggiore, where he painted works of great charm such as Goats at Gignese (watercolour, 1895). Notwithstanding his intense activity and continued public success (he was awarded the Premio Principe Umberto in 1874, 1894 and 1900), Bianchi spent his final years in poverty, assisted by his nephew, the painter Pompeo Mariani (1857–1927).

Among his main works were a Monaca di Monza and a Milton exhibited in 1877 in Naples. In 1878, he exhibited in Paris a portrait of his father, a portrait of Signora Ponti, and I Chierici in Processione (Clerics in Procession). In 1881 in Milan, he exhibited Burrasca nel Golfo di Venezia; in 1884 in Turin, he exhibited Canale di Chioggia; in 1887 Venice, he exhibited five canvases: Mascherata Chioggiotta; Laguna in burrasca; Chioggia; Parola di Dio, and Vaporino di Chioggia.

== Gallery ==
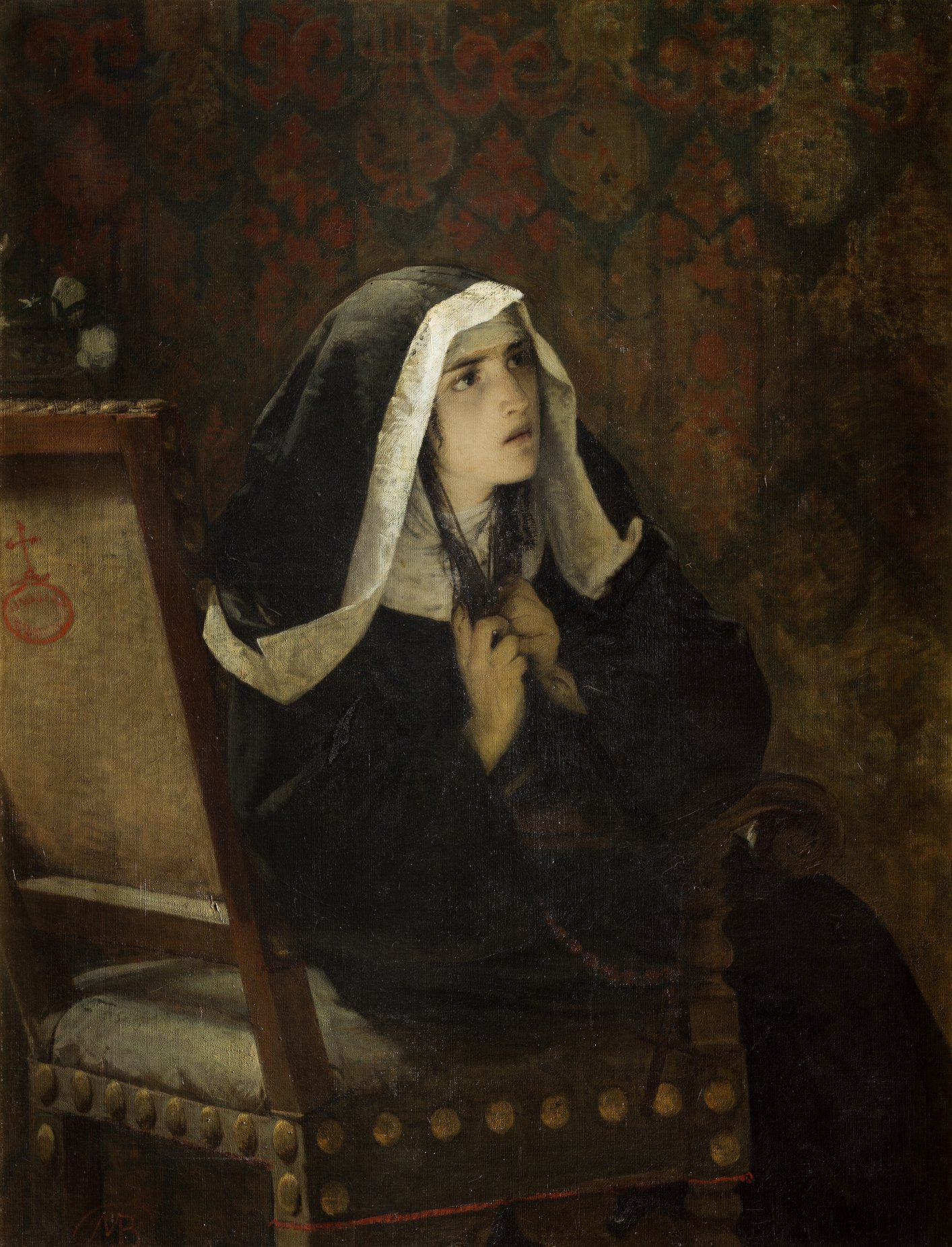
The Nun of Monza, 1865 (from the 1827 Manzoni's novel The Betrothed)

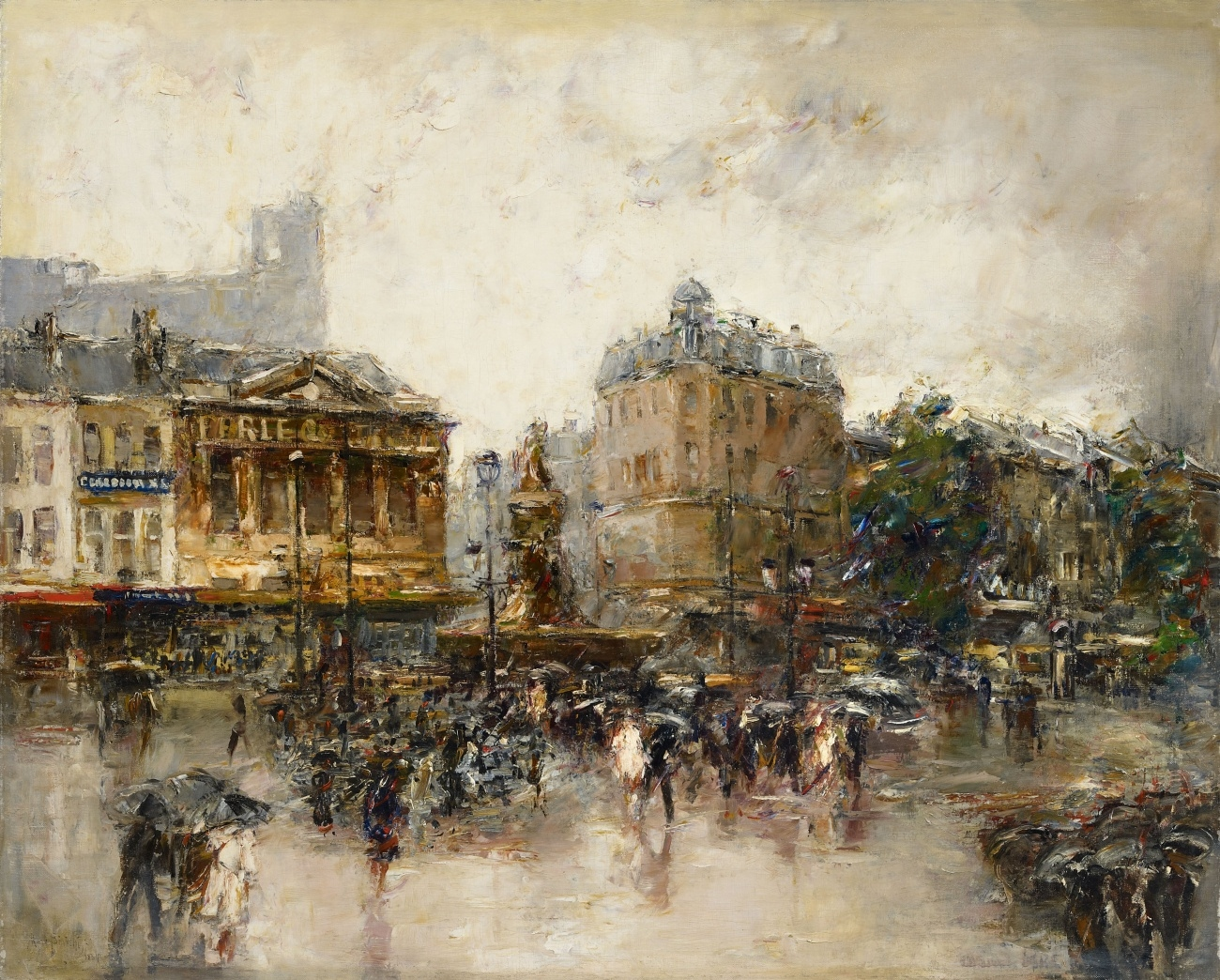
Paris place de Clichy, 1884

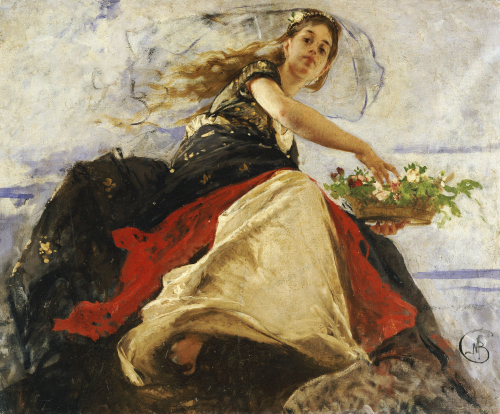
Flora, c. 1890

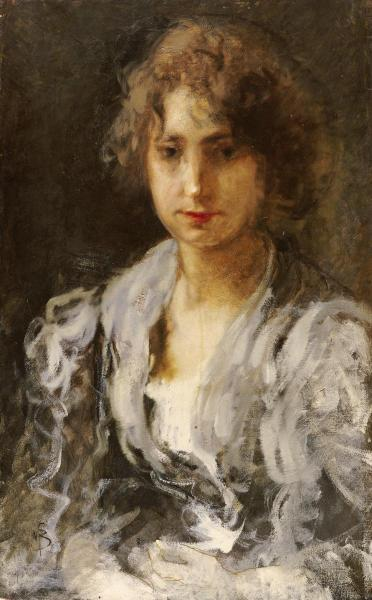
Portrait of a Lady, c. 1890

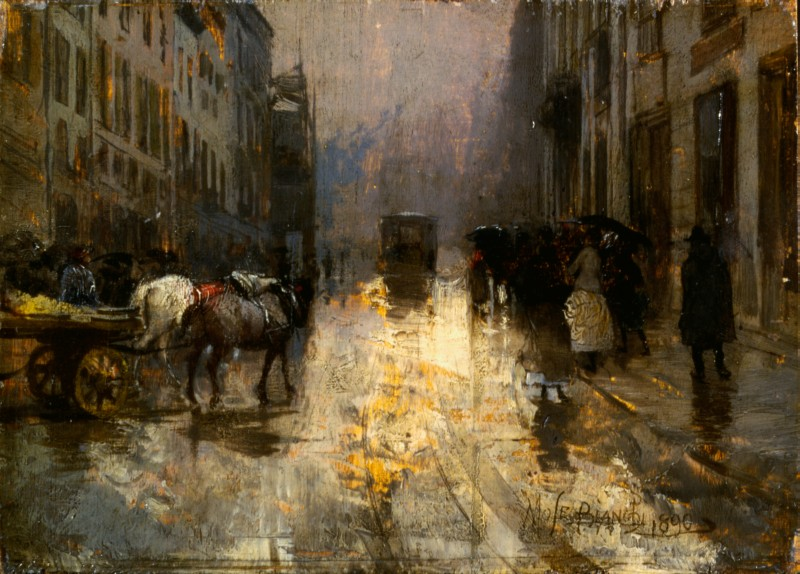
Vecchia Milano, Old Milano, 1890

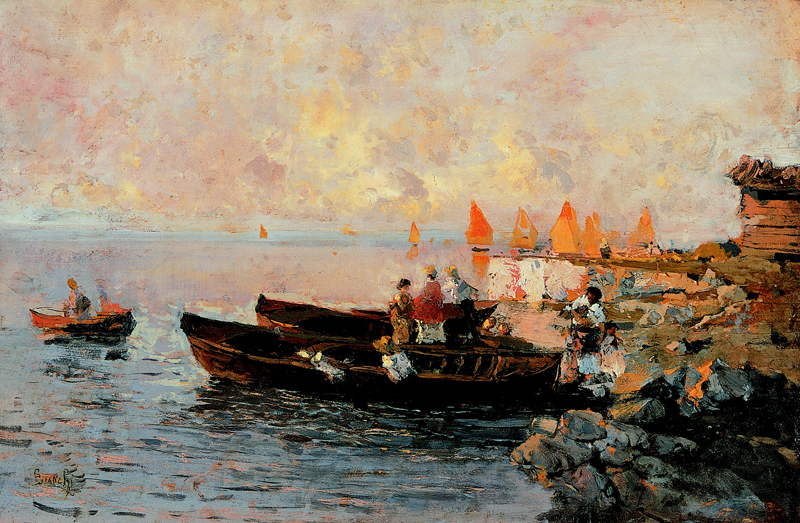
Lagoon at Sunset, c. 1893

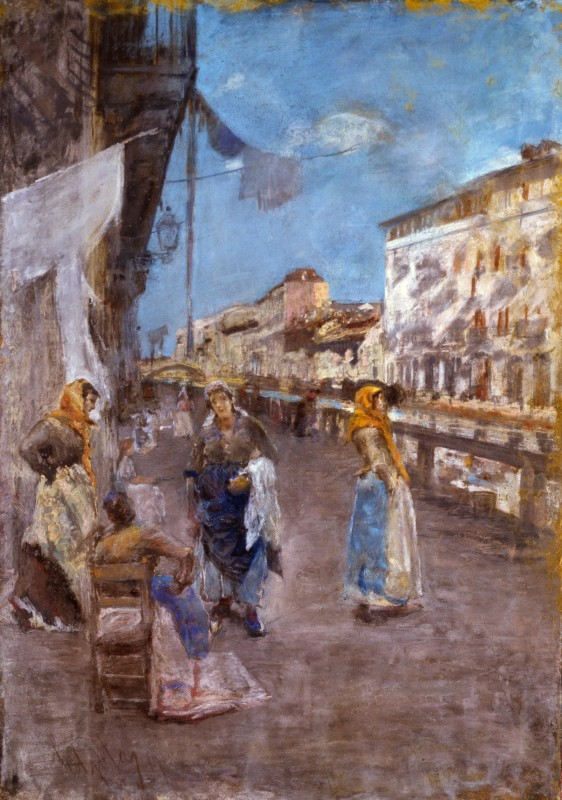
Washerwomen along the Canal (Naviglio), c. 1894–1899

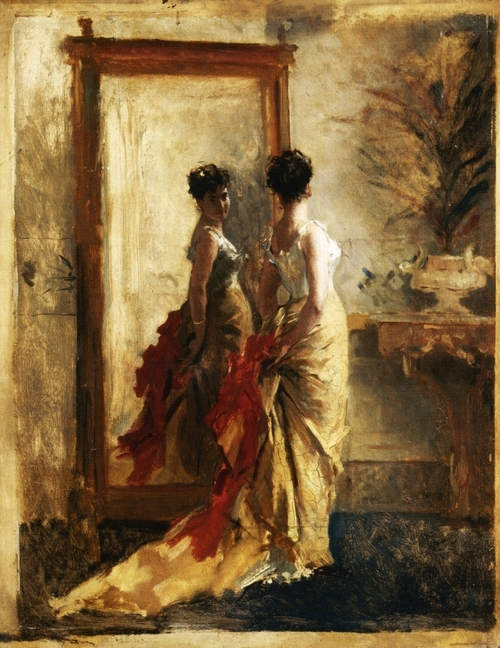
Woman in front of a Mirror, c. 1900

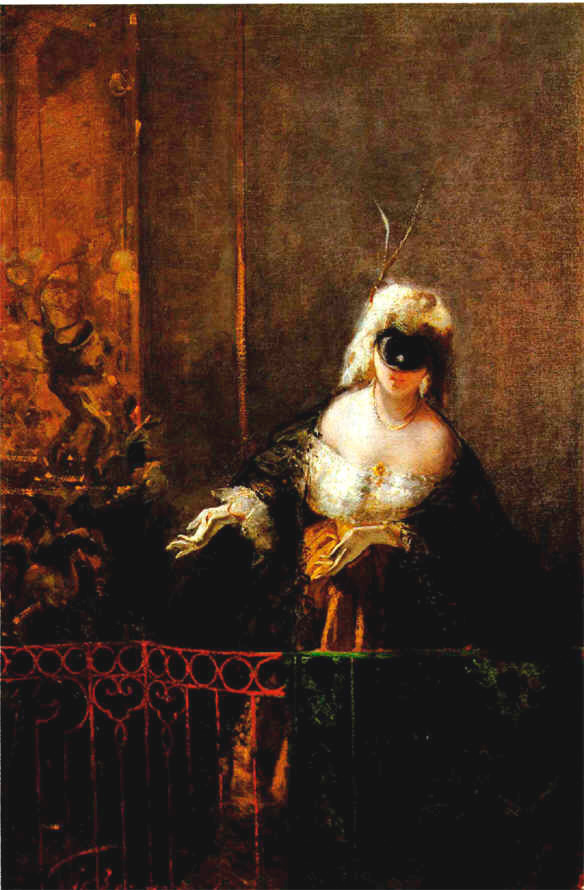
Carnaval in Venice, c. 1910

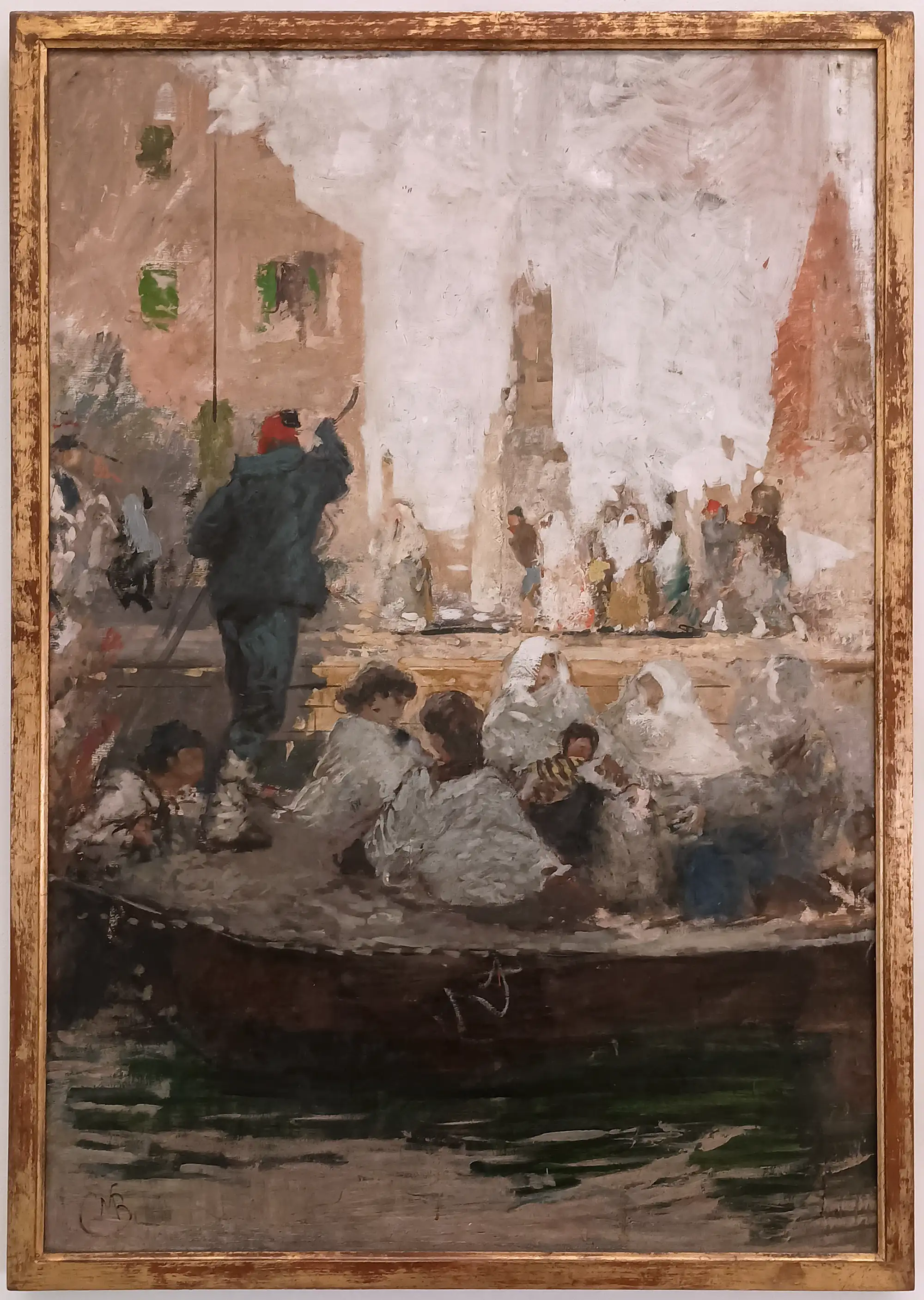
By Boat, Pinacoteca Ambrosiana, Milan, Italy

== Works ==
- Gondola sul canale, oil on canvas, Accademia Carrara, Bergamo.
- A victim of the 17th-century (1863) Museo Civico, Brescia,
- Deposition, 1887 Cappella Visconti, Cimitère, Carnisio,
- Woman painter (1874); Carrobbio, Museo Raccolte Frugone at Villa Grimaldi-Fassio in Nervi, a frazione of Genoa,
- Frescoes, 1887 Villa San Fermo (or Giovanelli), Lonigo
- The sagra della vigilia, 1864; The Female letter-reader 1867; I fratelli al campo, 1867; The benedizione delle box, 1870 Interno rustico, Pinacoteca di Brera, Milan,
- Frescoes in Salotto Azzurro; Flora (1885), Palazzo Turati, Milan,
- Deposition, 1899, Cimitero Monumentale, Cappella Frova, Milan
- Frescos, Saletta Reale, Stazione Centrale, Milan
- Cleopatra, 1865; Portrait of Orsola Rebecchi(1875); Portrait of Luigi Galbiati (1876); Traversata, (1885); Snows in Milan (c. 1885); Il ritorno dalla sagra (1887); Fishermen of Chioggia (1890); The Washerwomen (1894); Sad Return (1897); Notturno, (c. 1898); Reminiscenze milanesi del 1848 1898 Busto di giovane donna, 1898 - 1899, Galleria d'Arte Moderna, Milan
- Portrait of Giulia Lucini Colombani (1894), Ospedale Maggiore, Milan
- Crucifixion, 1881 Diocesan Museum, Milan,
- Cavalcando; Pecore al ruscello; Scena rustic; Flora; Monache al lido; Donna col bambino al seno; Paolo and Francesca Pinacoteca Ambrosiana, Milan
- Lady of Monza (1865); Portrait of a Man (1875); The sorelle 1887, Museo Civico, Monza
- A street of Verona, Capodimonte Museum, Naples
- Resurrection (1874); Studio di testa, 1880; The paurose, 1881; Word of God 1887; Vaporino of Chioggia; Bosco nel Parco di Monza, 1895 Galleria Nazionale d'Arte Moderna, Rome,
- The Communion of St Louis Gonzaga (1864) Church Santa Maria Nascente and S. Carlo, Sant'Albino,
- It pittore Londonio, 1866; The lover Egidio, 1867; La Monaca di Monza, 1867 Galleria d'arte moderna, Turin
- The bufera, tempera on cardboard, Museo Revoltella, Trieste
- Crucifixion (1879), parish church S. Antonio Abate, Valmadrera,
- Portrait of a Lady c. 1898, Museo di Castelvecchio, Verona,
- Sanctuary of the Blessed Virgin of the Miracles, Corbetta
- Portrait of Simonetta Galimberti (1861)
- Portrait of Giacinta Galimberti (1861)
- After the Duel (1866)
- In Monza Cathedral (1872)
- Portrait of a Man (1875)
- Portrait of Giuseppe Antonio Fossati (1875)
- La storia (1877)
- Stemma sabaudo it Genio di Savoia (1883–1884)
- The spesa del Curato, (1885)

== See also ==
- Emilio Borsa
- Pompeo Mariani

== Bibliography ==
- Colasanti, Arduino (1930). "BIANCHI, Mosè". Enciclopedia Italiana. Rome: Istituto dell'Enciclopedia Italiana.
- Laura Casone, Mosè Bianchi, online catalogue Artgate by Fondazione Cariplo, 2010, CC BY-SA (source for the first revision of this article).
