= Paola Borri =

Italian physicist

Paola Borri is an Italian physicist whose research in biophotonics has included the use of Raman scattering in 3d microscopy of cancer-derived organoids. Other topics in her research have included nonlinear optics and the study of quantum dots. She is a professor of biosciences and of physics and astronomy at Cardiff University, coordinator of the European Marie Curie ETN consortium MUSIQ, and a Fellow of the Learned Society of Wales.

== Education and career ==
Borri studied physics at the University of Florence, earning a laurea in 1993 and a Ph.D. in 1997. She became a postdoctoral researcher at the Technical University of Denmark and at the Technical University of Dortmund, where she completed a habilitation in 2003 before taking her present position at Cardiff in 2004. Her habilitation thesis, Coherent Light-matter Interaction in Semiconductor Quantum Dots, was published as a book by Shaker Verlag (2004). She was given a personal chair at Cardiff in 2011.

== Recognition ==
Borri won a Marie Curie Excellence Award in 2006, for her work on "semiconductor nanostructures and their ultra-fast response to laser light". She was elected as a Fellow of the Learned Society of Wales in 2013. In 2015, she was a recipient of a Royal Society Wolfson Research Merit Award.
