= Joe Borri =

American writer

Joseph Adam Borri
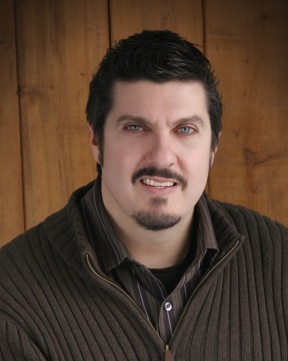
- Born: June 11, 1962 (age 64); Detroit, Michigan
- Education: Northern Michigan University
- Website: www.joeborri.net

Joe Borri (born June 11, 1962, in Detroit, Michigan) is an artist and writer. Born and raised in Detroit, Borri graduated from Northern Michigan University in 1984. He is married and has four children.

His 2007 anthology "Eight Dogs Named Jack" was published by Momentum Books.
