= Francesco Boccaccino =

Italian painter

Francesco Boccaccino (c. 1680–1750) was an Italian painter of the Baroque. He was born at Cremona. He studied at Rome, first under Giacinto Brandi, and afterwards worked in the studio of Carlo Maratta. The Cremonese Antonio Beltrami was one of Boccaccino's pupils.

== Gallery ==
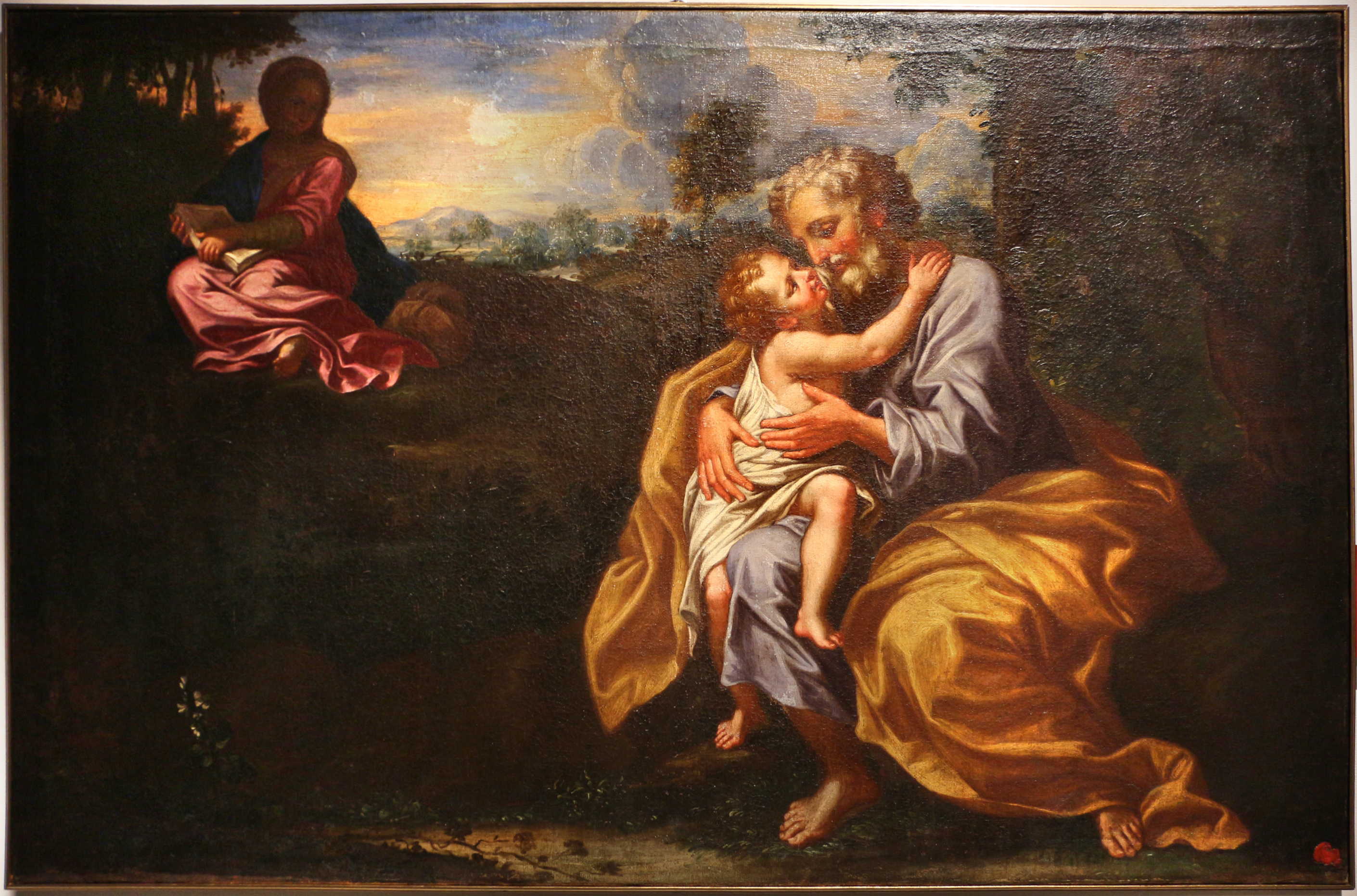
The Holy Family

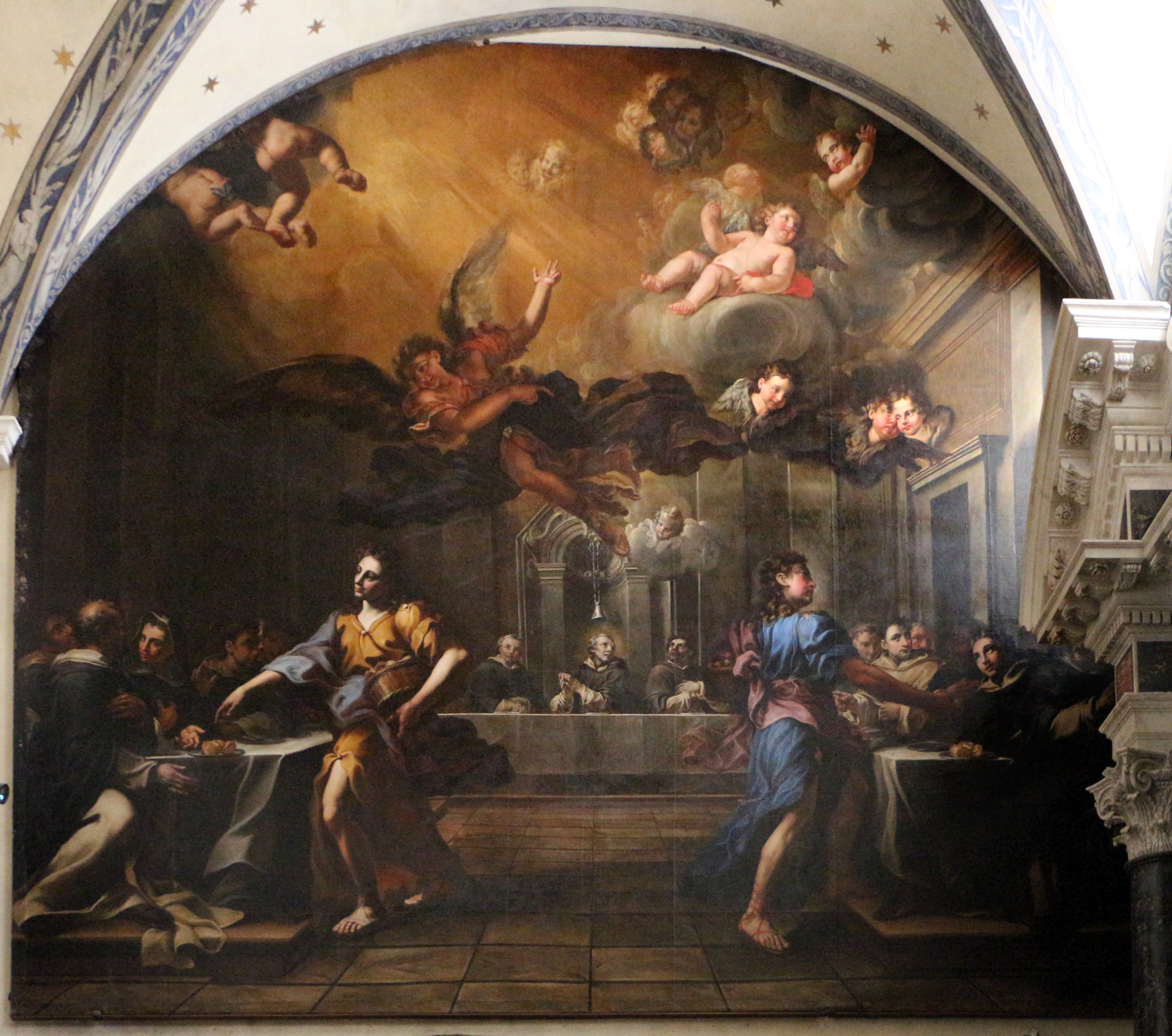
Miracle of the Loaves Served by Angels to the First Dominicans

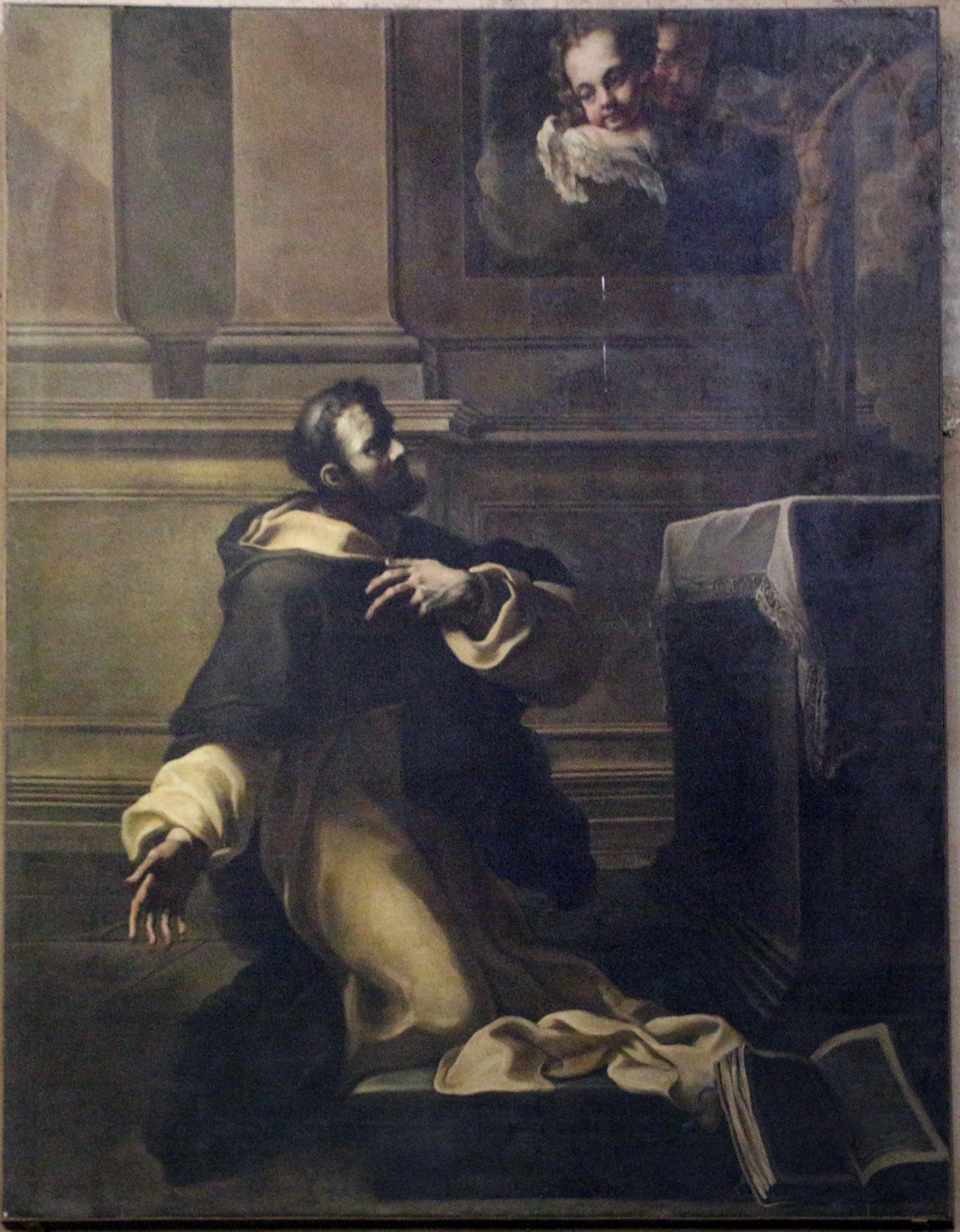
The Crucifix Speaks to St. Peter the Martyr, 1697

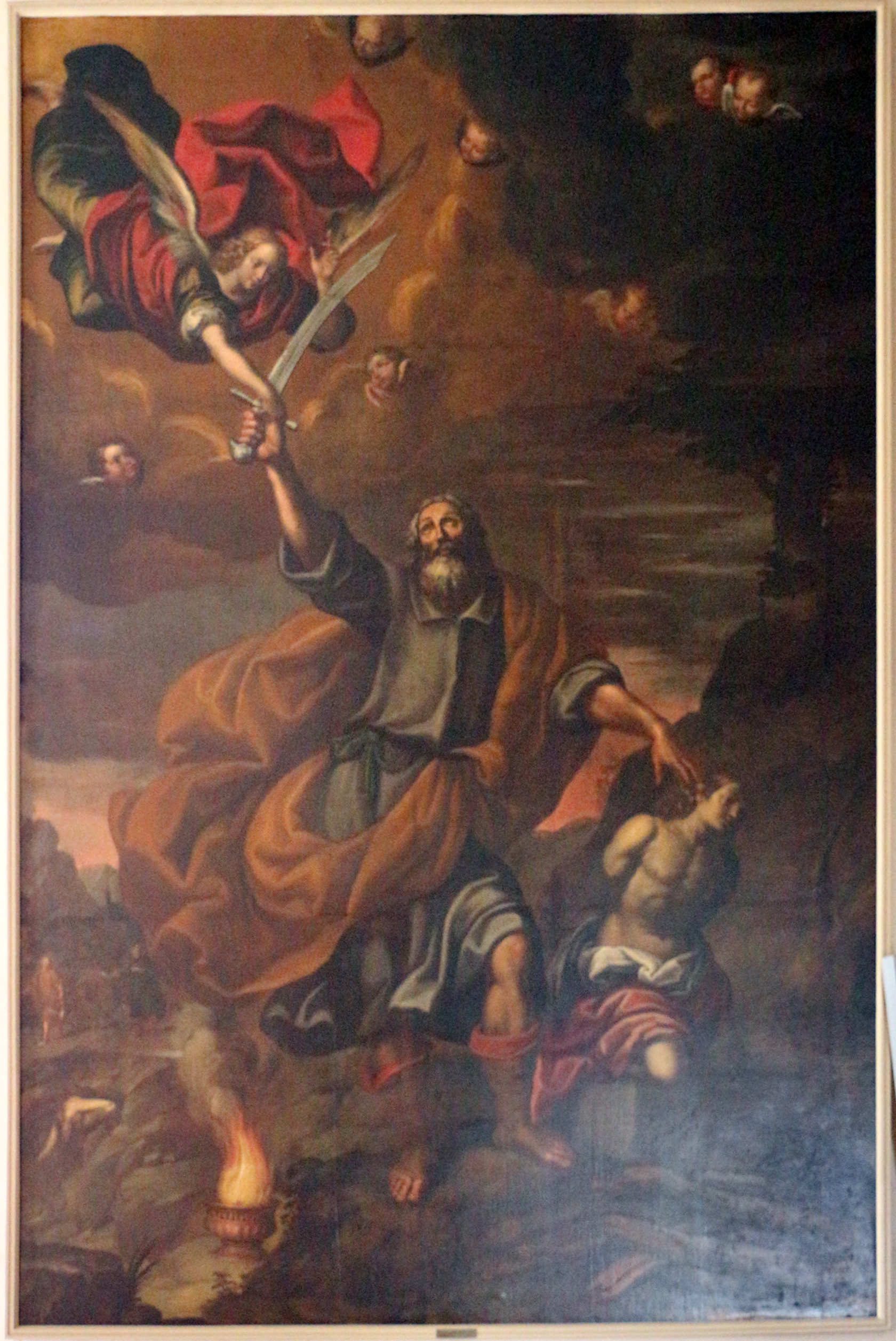
Sacrifice of Issac

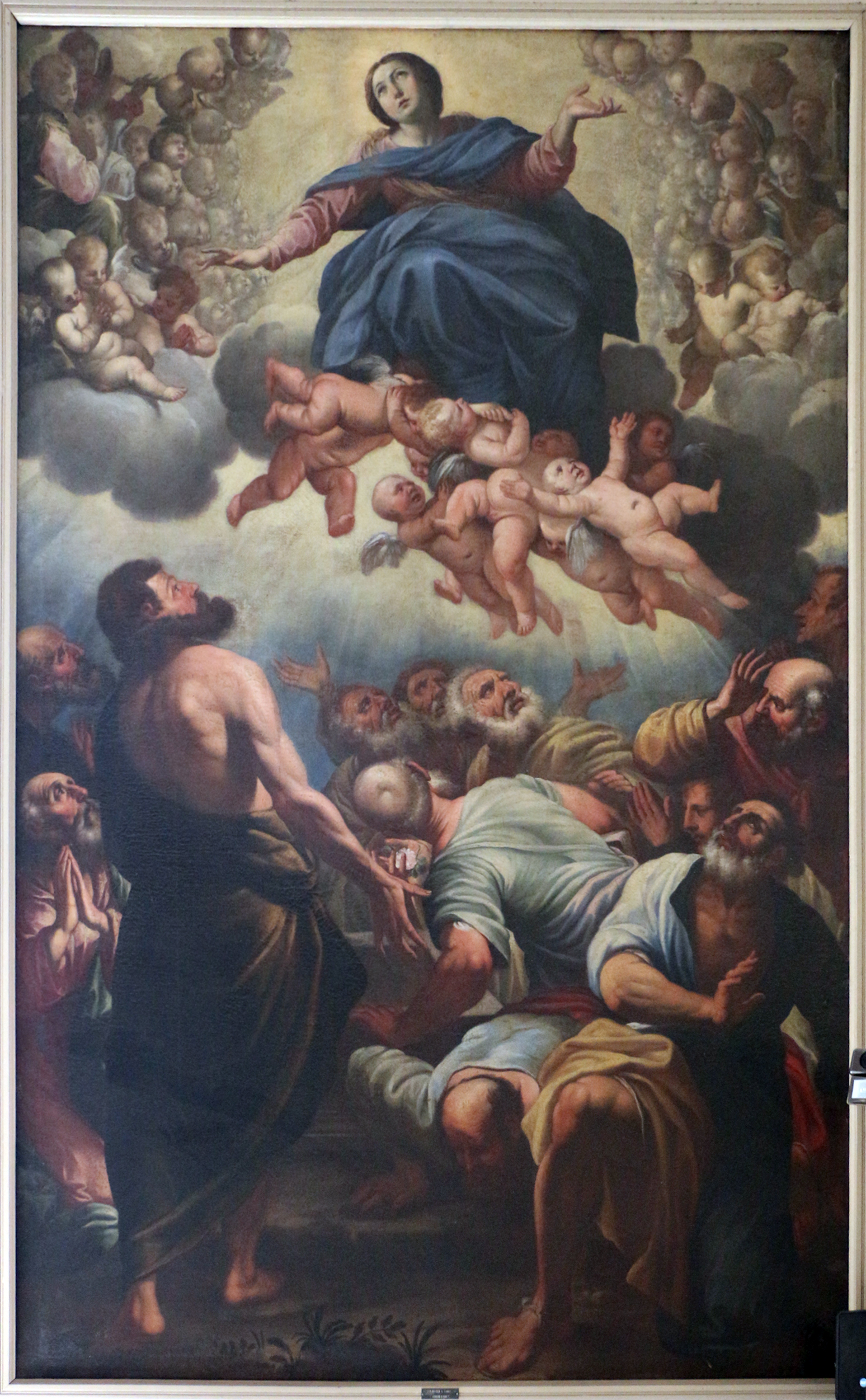
Assumption of the Virgin
