= Antonio Beltrami =

Italian painter (1724–1784)

- Born: 1724; Cremona
- Died: 1784 (aged 59–60)
- Occupation: painter
- Known for: late-Baroque and Neoclassic periods
- Notable work: canvas of Saints of the Franciscan order
- Relatives: Giovanni Battista (brother, engraver)

Antonio Beltrami (1724–1784) was an Italian painter active in the late-Baroque and Neoclassic periods. He was born in Cremona. He was a pupil of Francesco Boccaccino, who emerged from the school of Carlo Maratta. His older brother, Giovanni Battista was an engraver.

Antonio painted at age 16 for the church of the Observant Minorites of San'Angelo in Cremona a canvas of Saints of the Franciscan order. He traveled to the royal court in Vienna to paint portraits and decorate maps.
