= Robecco sul Naviglio =

Robecco sul Naviglio Robecch sul Niviri (Lombard)
- Comune
- Comune di Robecco sul Naviglio
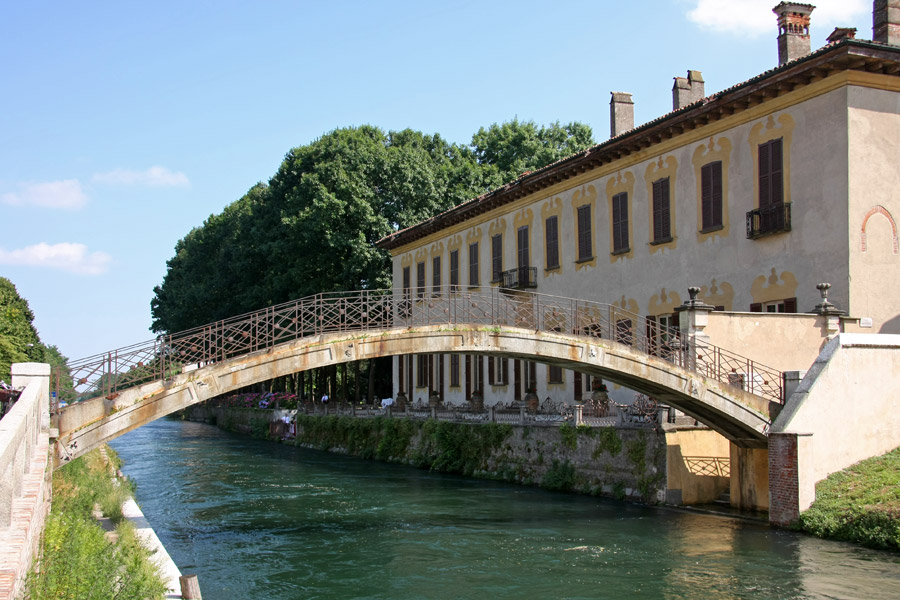

- Coat of arms

- Location within Italy Location within Lombardy
- Coordinates: 45°26′N 8°53′E
- Country: Italy
- Region: Lombardy
- Metropolitan city: Milan (MI)
- Frazioni: Casterno, Cascinazza, Castellazzo de' Barzi, Carpenzago

Government
  - Mayor: Fortunata Barni

Area
  - Total: 19.79 km^{2} (7.64 sq mi)
- Elevation: 120 m (390 ft)

Population (31 December 2020)
  - Total: 6,716
  - Density: 339.4/km^{2} (878.9/sq mi)
- Demonym: Robecchesi
- Time zone: UTC+1 (CET)
  - Summer (DST): UTC+2 (CEST)
- Postal code: 20087
- Dialing code: 02
- Patron saint: St. John the Baptist
- Saint day: First Sunday in September
- Website: Official website

Robecco sul Naviglio (Milanese: Robecch sul Niviri [ruˈbɛk syl niˈʋiːri]) is a comune (municipality) in the Metropolitan City of Milan in the Italian region Lombardy, located about 20 kilometres (12 mi) west of Milan.

== Twin towns ==
- Fosses-la-Ville, Belgium
