= Domenico Cunego =

Italian printmaker

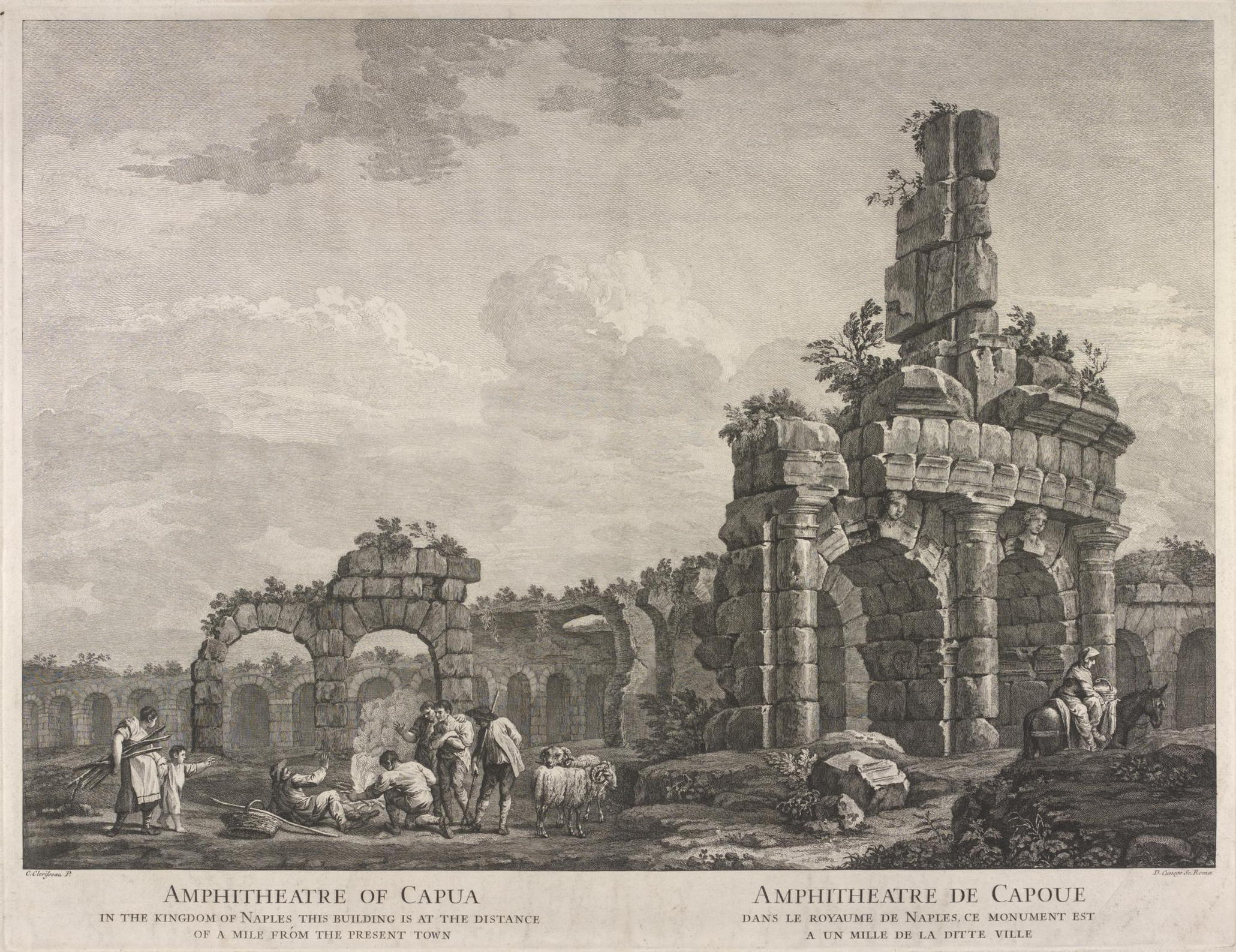
- Etching of the Amphitheatre of Capua, c. 1794
- Born: 1727; Verona, Republic of Venice
- Died: 8 January 1803 (aged 75–76); Rome, Papal States
- Education: Francesco Ferrari
- Known for: Printmaking
- Movement: Neoclassicism

Domenico Cunego (1727 – 8 January 1803) was an Italian printmaker. The engravings he made depicting Michelangelo's Sistine Chapel ceiling, published in Gavin Hamilton's Schola Italica Picturae (1773), were an important source for the artists of his time.

== Biography ==
=== Early life ===
Domenico Cunego was born in Verona in 1727, He was the pupil of an otherwise unknown painter by the name of Francesco Ferrari. When he was 18, and after executing several paintings, all of which are now lost or untraceable, he turned to engraving, an art in which he may have been self-taught (Gori Gandellini). Between 1752 and 1760 he collaborated with Dionigi Valesi on the illustrations for a three-volume catalogue of the coin collection of Giacomo Muselli, published in Verona (1752, 1756, 1760). Also from the 1750s are several Views of Verona after drawings by T. Majeroni and the St. Thomas of Villanova (1757) after Antonio Balestra. This Veronese painter was frequently a source of inspiration for Cunego, who often reproduced works by his contemporaries, for example Francesco Solimena and Felice Boscaratti (1721–1807).

=== Career ===
In October 1760 Cunego came into contact with James Adam, younger brother of Robert Adam, who was visiting Verona. Together with Adam and his travelling companions, Charles-Louis Clérisseau, Antonio Zucchi and the Veronese draughtsman Giuseppe Sacco (1735–98), Cunego visited Florence and Siena, and in February 1761 he arrived in Rome. He remained in the service of Adam for about two years, during which time he engraved two plates for Robert Adam’s Ruins of the Palace of the Emperor Diocletian at Spalatro in Dalmatia (London, 1764), as well as 14 views of towns in the region of Campania after drawings by Clérisseau, printed about 1763.

Adam returned to London in 1763, but Cunego preferred to remain working independently in Rome. He remained on good terms with his former patron, however, and with the world of English publishing in general. Between 1764 and 1778 he executed many engravings after Gavin Hamilton’s paintings; most important are several pictures based on the Iliad. Cunego was commissioned in 1769 to produce several plates for the Collection of Prints Engraved after the Most Capital Paintings in England, published in London by John Boydell, and 22 plates for the Schola Italica picturae by Gavin Hamilton, a collection of engravings of 16th- and 17th-century Italian paintings (Rome, 1773). He also produced plates for David Allan's Origin of Portraiture.

During the same period Cunego also made a large number of engravings after the work of famous artists of the past such as Giorgione, Titian, Reni, Domenichino, Guercino and (in 1780) after Michelangelo’s Last Judgement (Rome, Vatican, Sistine Chapel). He produced plates of portraits, particularly those of popes: Clement XIII (after Piranesi), Clement XIV and Pius VI (after Giovanni Domenico Porta).

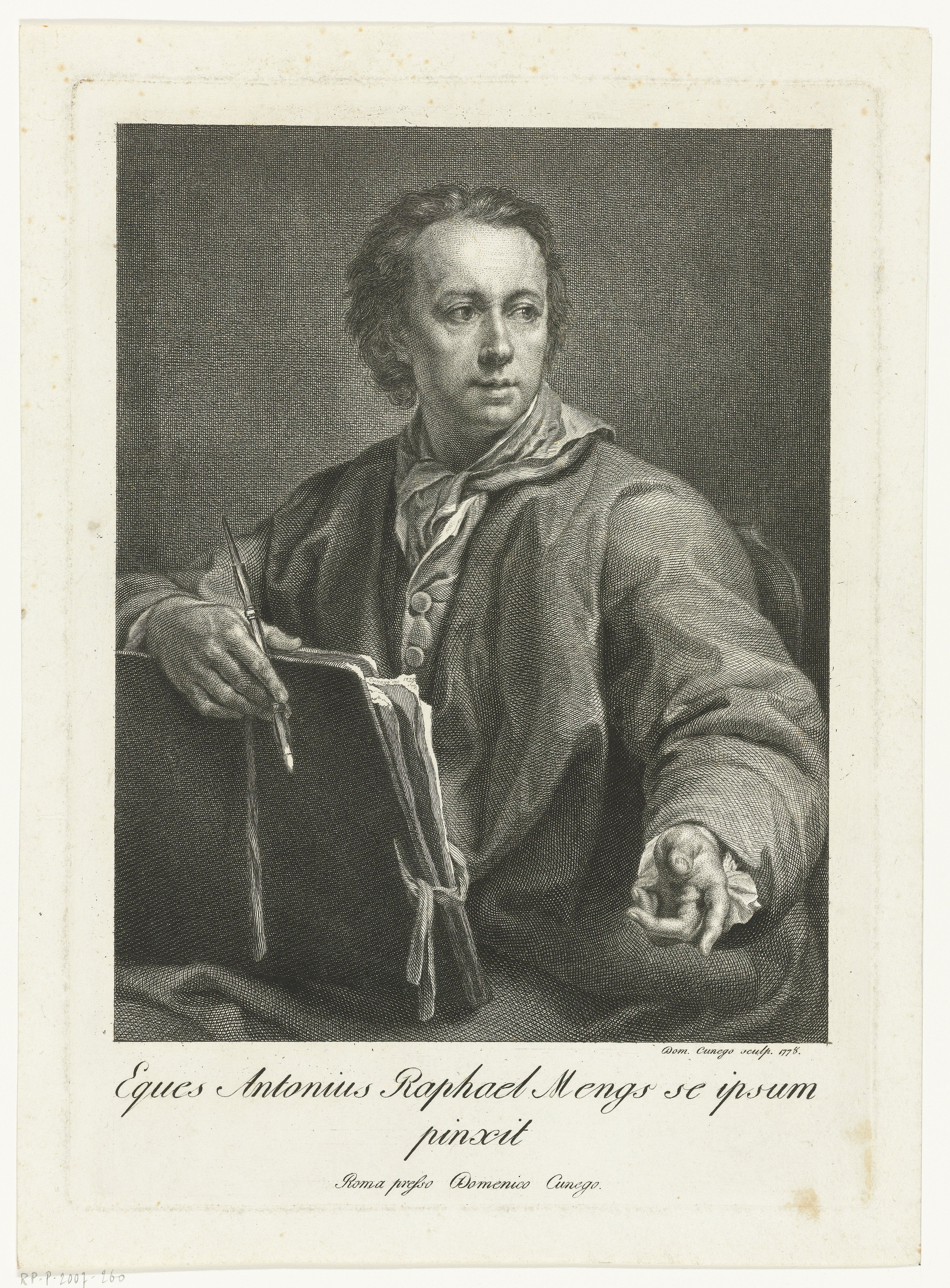
Engraved portrait of Anton Raphael Mengs by Domenico Cunego

By this time Cunego was famous in Rome and well established in Neoclassical circles. He was the favourite engraver of Anton Raphael Mengs, many of whose works he reproduced in engravings and etchings. Mengs’s tracings were the basis for Cunego’s 40 engravings of the heads of figures from Raphael’s School of Athens (Rome, Vatican, Stanza della Segnatura). In 1785 Cunego travelled to Berlin, where he was invited to manage the copperplate printing works of someone named Pascal; he returned to Rome, however, four years later.

=== Later works ===
In Germany Cunego experimented with engraving in the manière noire (mezzotint), which became the predominant mode of expression in his later Roman works. A number of plates date from the 1790s, notably 27 Views of Rome as well as some devotional engravings. His last engraved work may have been the Tomb of Bishop de Fatatis (1800), after a drawing by Ciaffaroni. He continued to run his own school until his death and numbered among his pupils Gian Carlo Colombo, Camillo Tinti and his sons by his first marriage Luigi Cunego (b. 1750, d. 1823) and Giuseppe Cunego (b. 1760). Cunego died in Rome on 8 January 1803.

== Works ==
- Illustrations for the 3-volume catalogue of Giacomo Muselli's coin collection, in collaboration with Dionigi Valesi (1752, 1756, 1760). Internet Archive
- Views of Verona after drawings by T. Majeroni (1750s)
- St. Thomas of Villanova (1757), after a painting by Antonio Balestra (a frequent source for Cunego)
- Some of the engravings for Ruins of the palace of the Emperor Diocletian at Spalato in Dalmatia. by Robert Adam, 1764

== Gallery ==
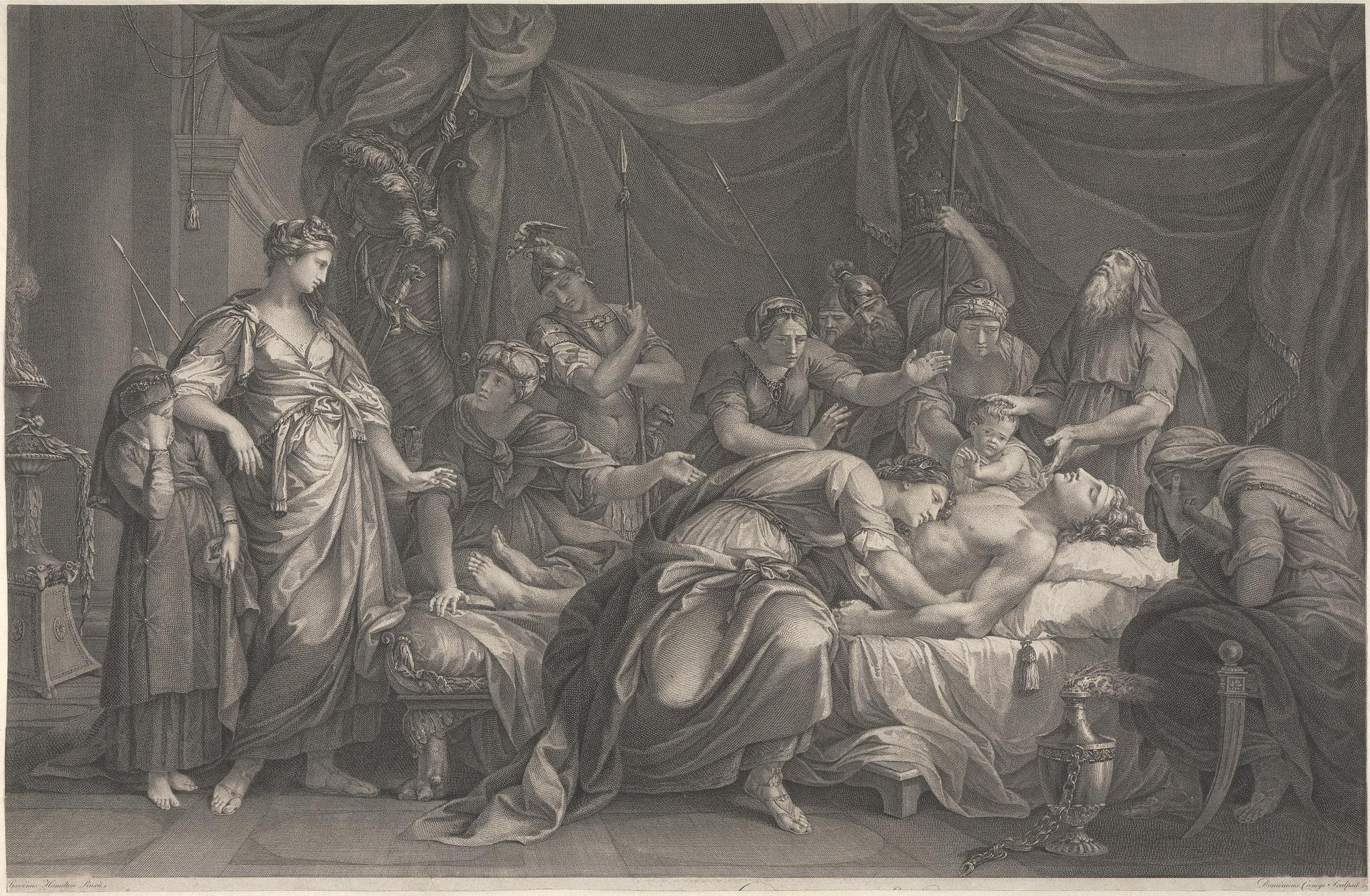
Andromache Bewailing the Death of Hector, 1764, Yale Center for British Art

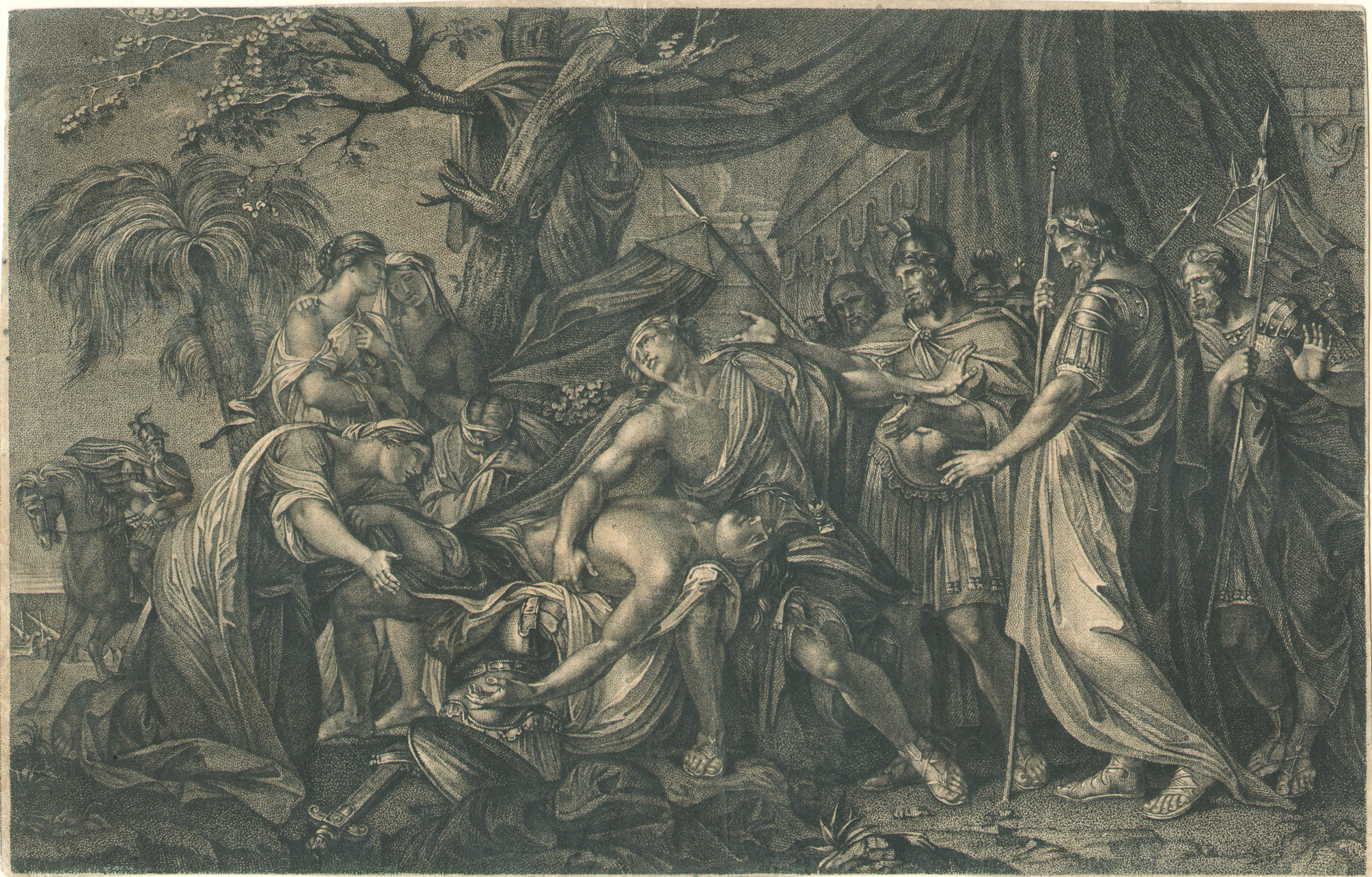
Achilles Laments the Death of Patroclus, 1764

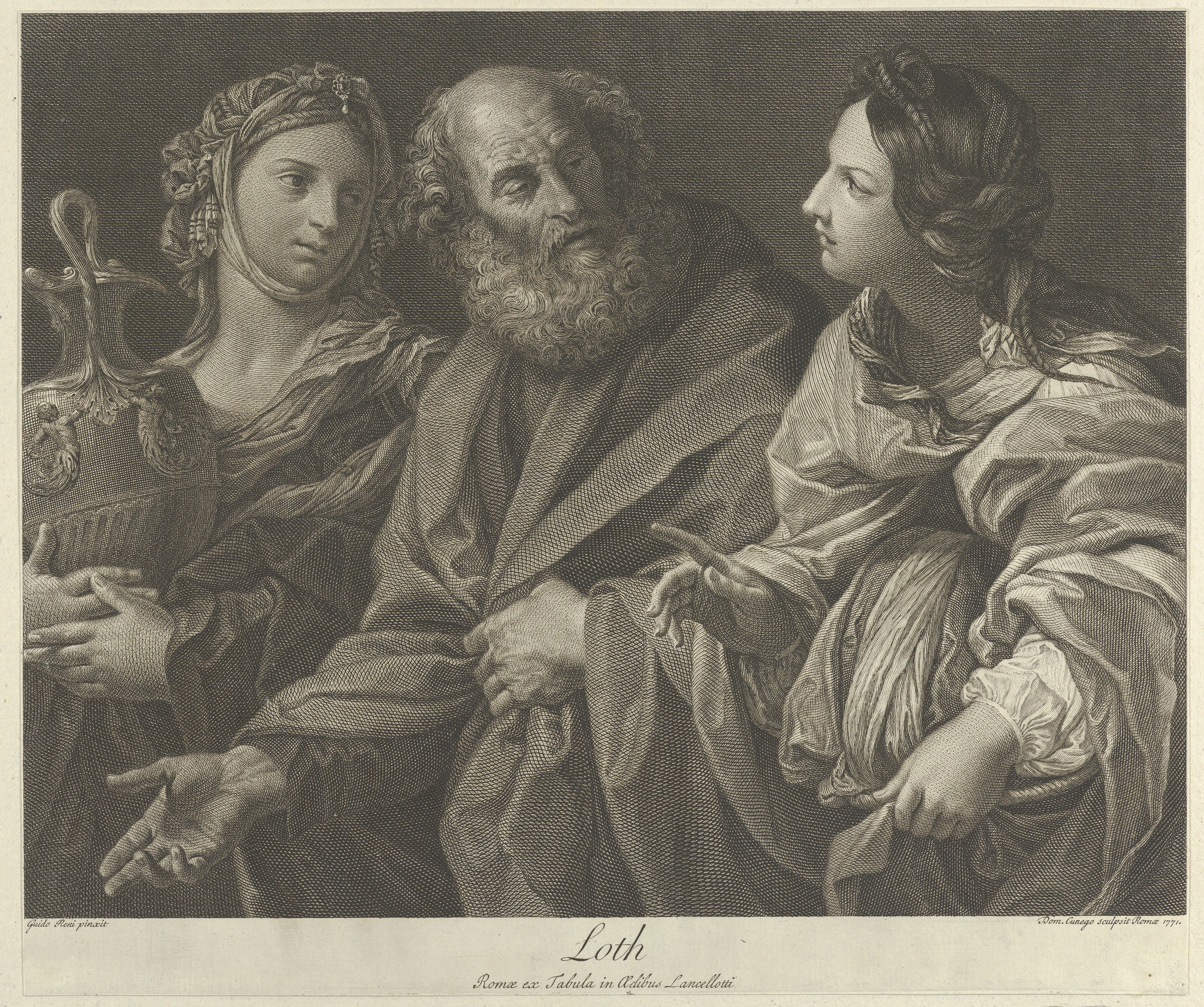
Lot flanked by his two daughters, Metropolitan Museum of Art

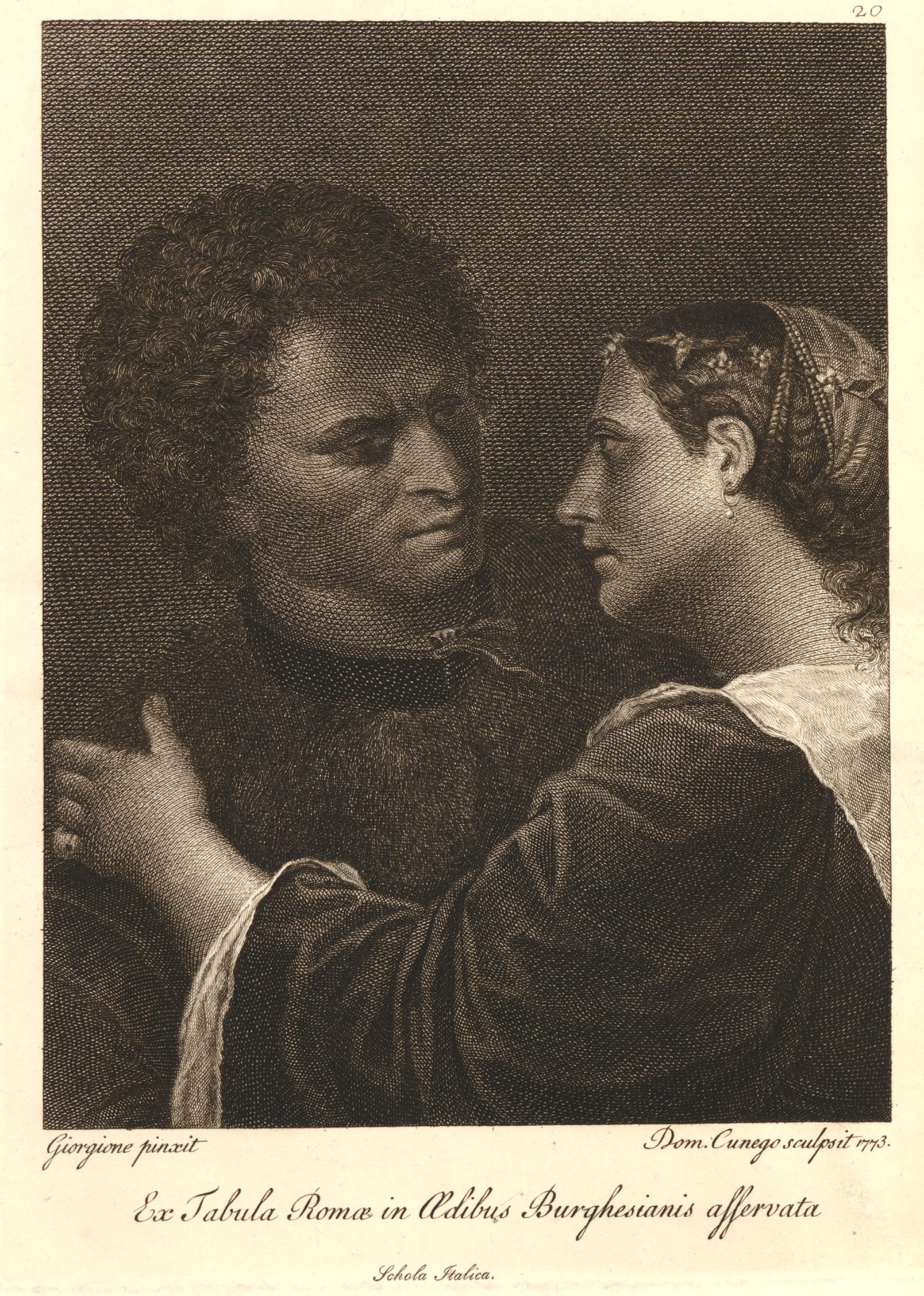
A man and woman embracing, plate from Schola Italica Picturae

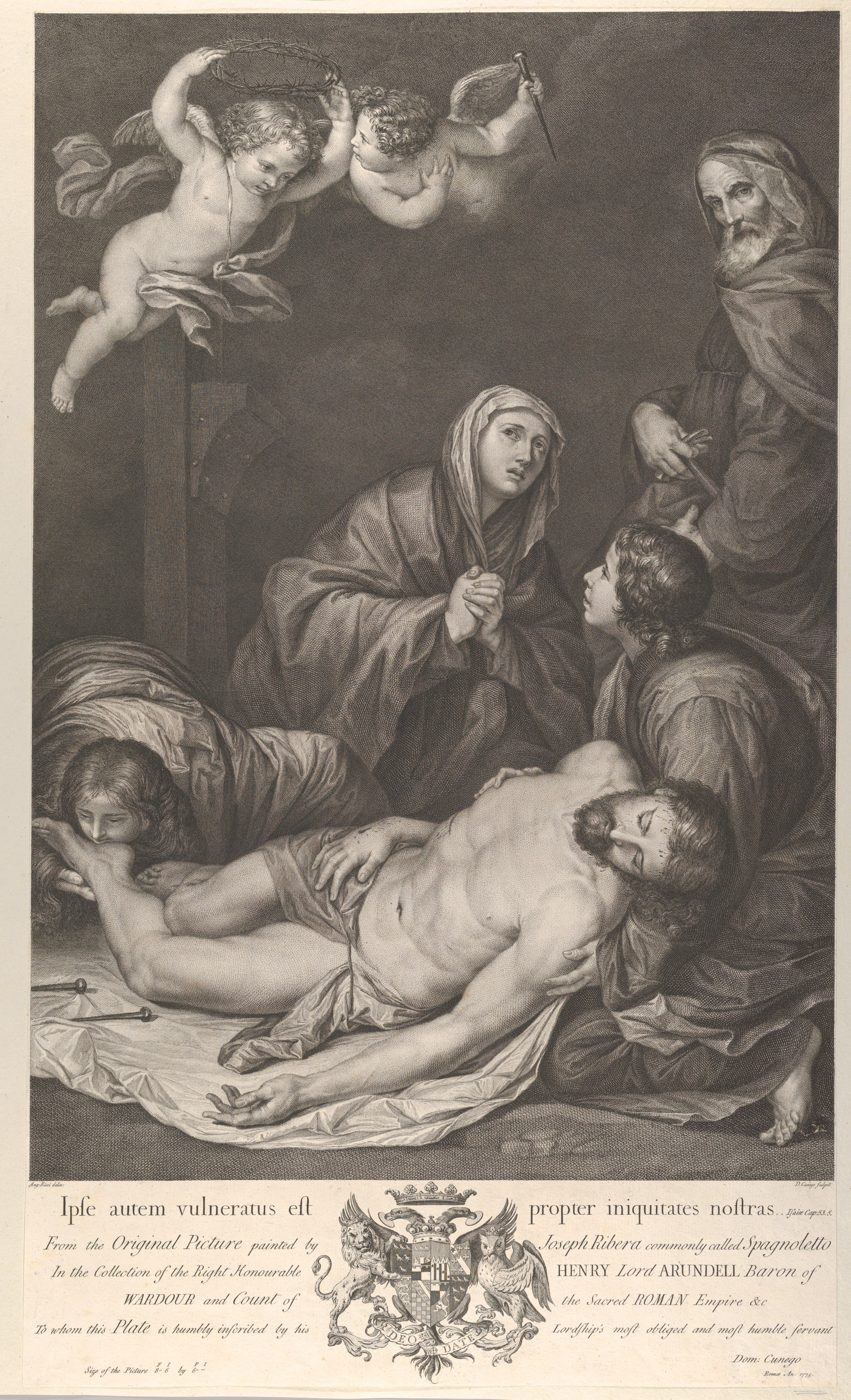
Entombment of Christ, 1775, Metropolitan Museum of Art

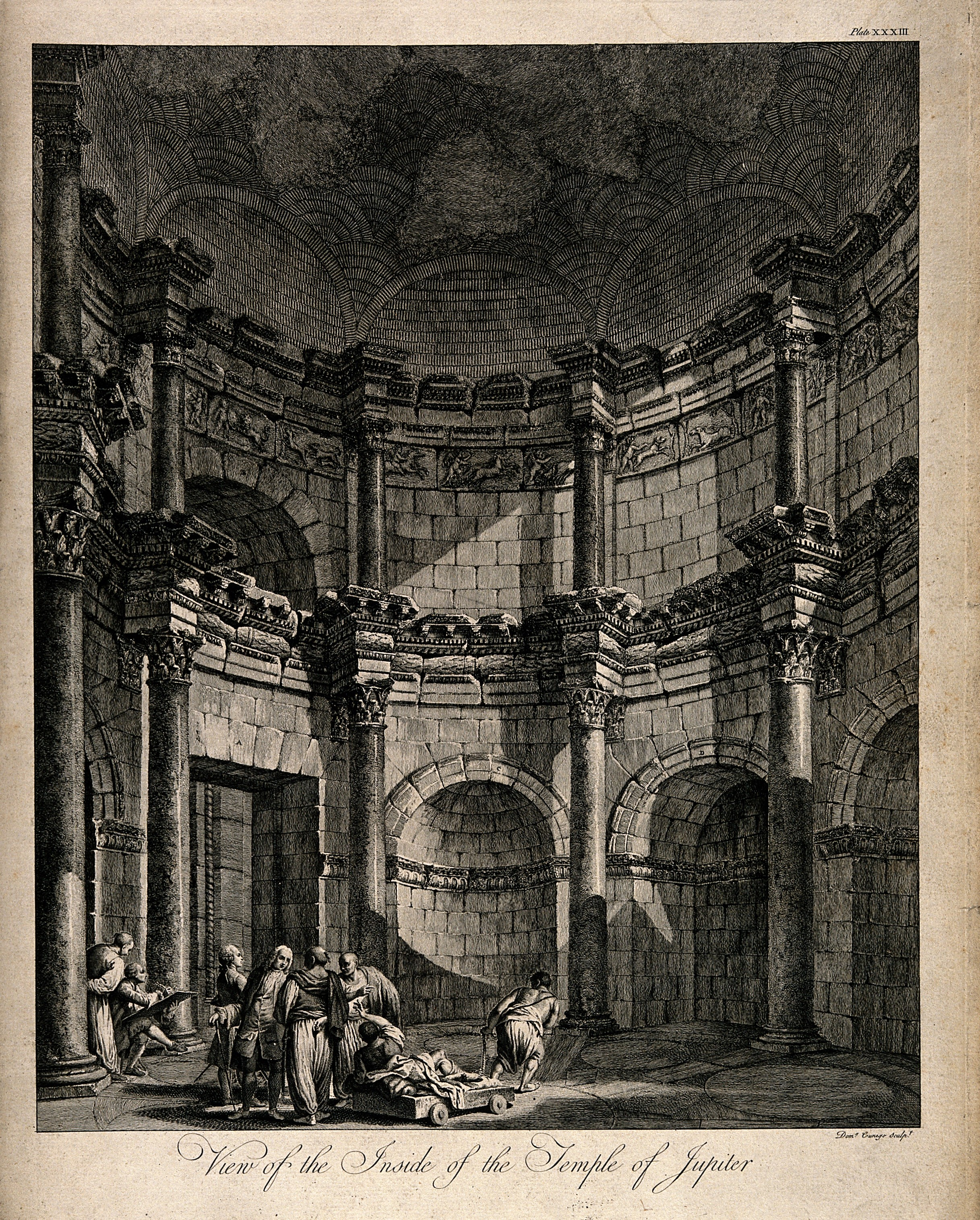
Temple of Jupiter, Spalato

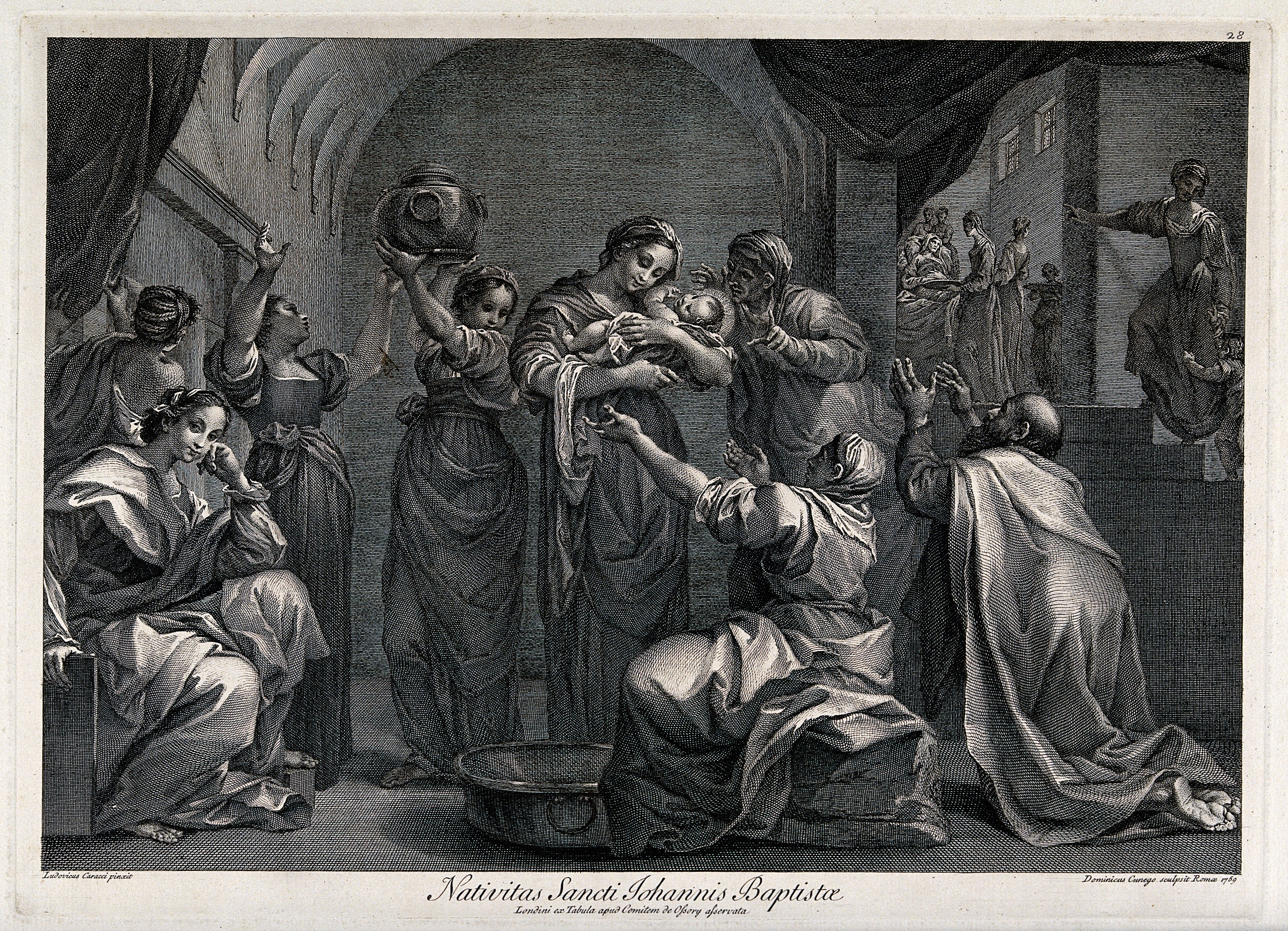
Saint John the Baptist

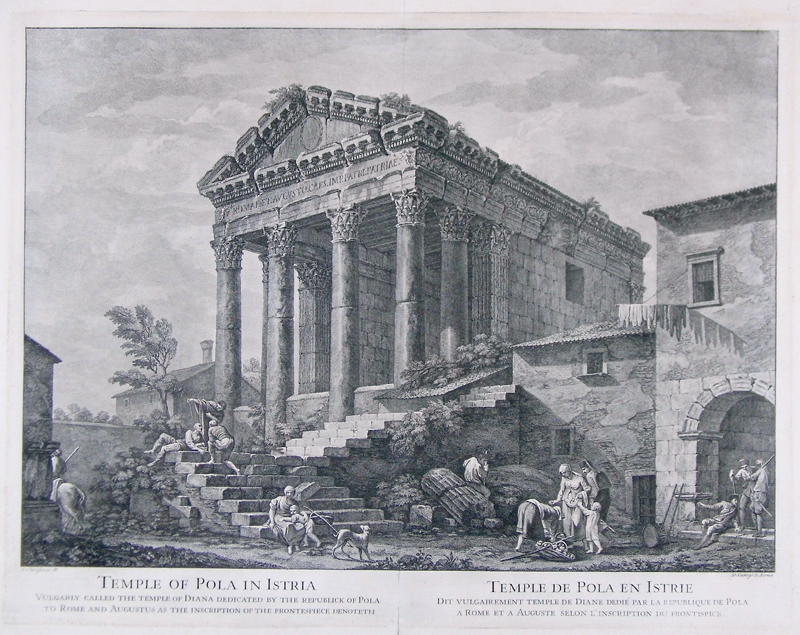
Temple of Pola in Istria, 1760–67

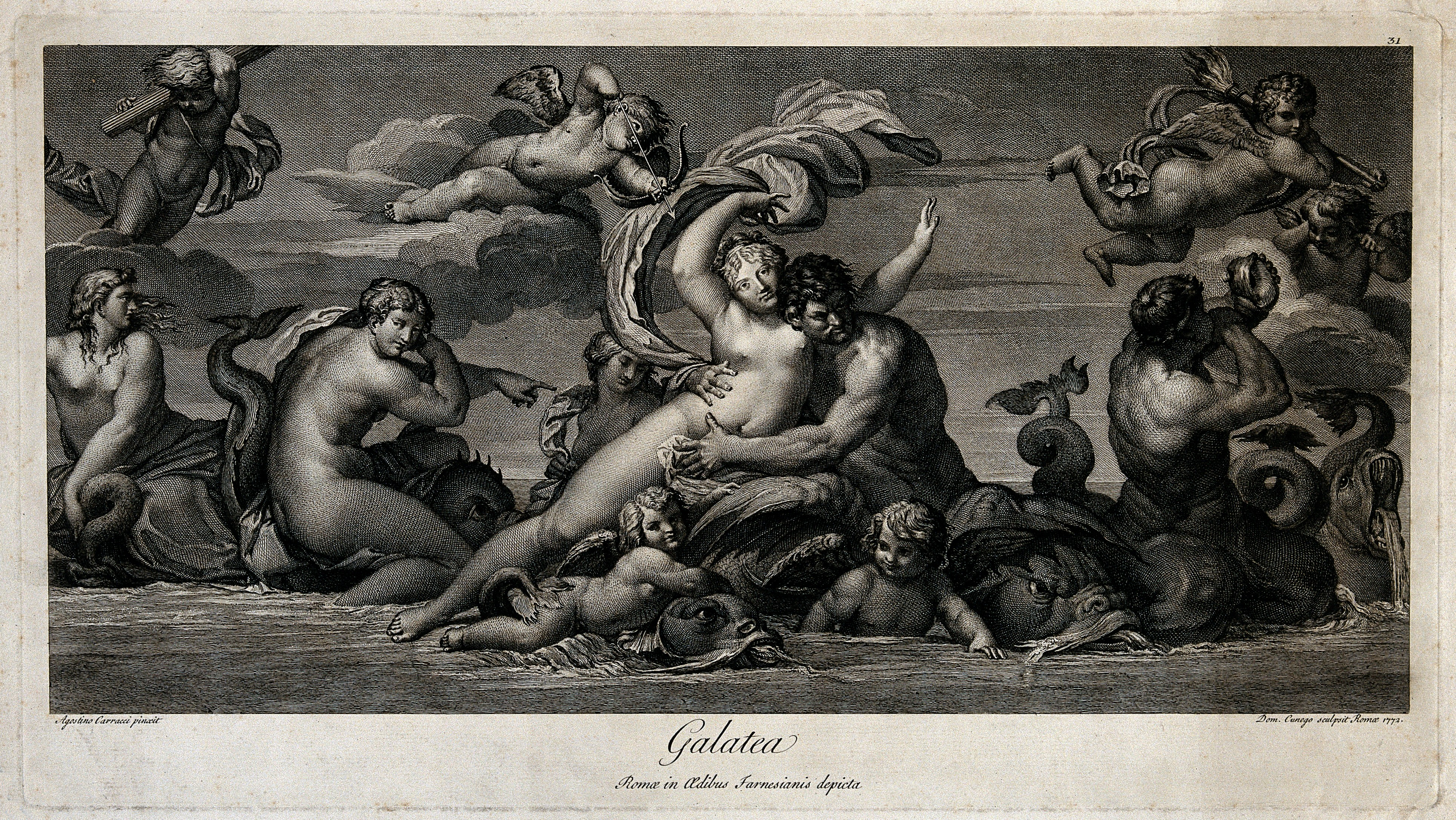
Galatea. Engraving by D. Cunego after Agostino Carracci

== Sources ==
- Bryan, Michael (1903). Bryan's dictionary of painters and engravers. Vol. 1: A-C. G. New York: Macmillan.
