= Felice Boscaratti =

Italian painter

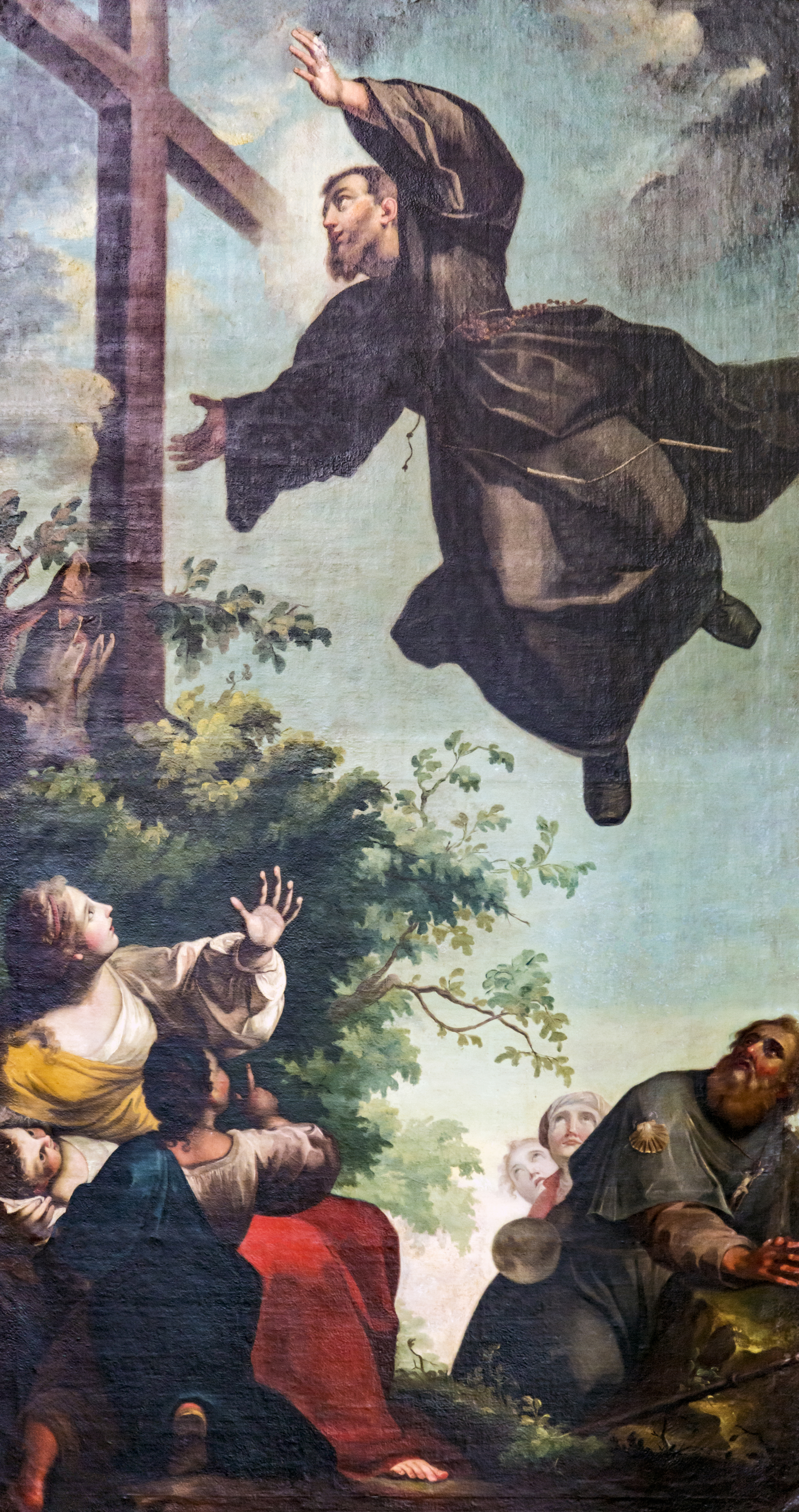
Saint Joseph of Cupertino in ectasy, church of San Lorenzo, Vicenza

Felice Boscaratti (1721 in Verona – 1807) was an Italian painter. A pupil of the Rotari, he soon became established as a painter and teacher. He moved to Vicenza but also worked in his birthplace of Verona - his works at the latter include Saints Ignazio and Bonaventura in the cappella Canossa a S. Bernardino. His works were reproduced by engravers such as Domenico Cunego.

== Sources ==
- Felice Boscaratti on artnet
- (in Italian) http://www.verona.com/it/Veronesi-Illustri/Felice-Boscaratti/
