= Valesi =

Valesi is an Italian surname. Notable people with the surname include:

- Anna Valesi (born 2002), Italian pair skater
- Dionigi Valesi (c. 1730–c. 1780), Italian printmaker
- Giovanni Valesi (1735–1816), German singer
