= Antonio Balestra =

Italian painter (1666–1740)

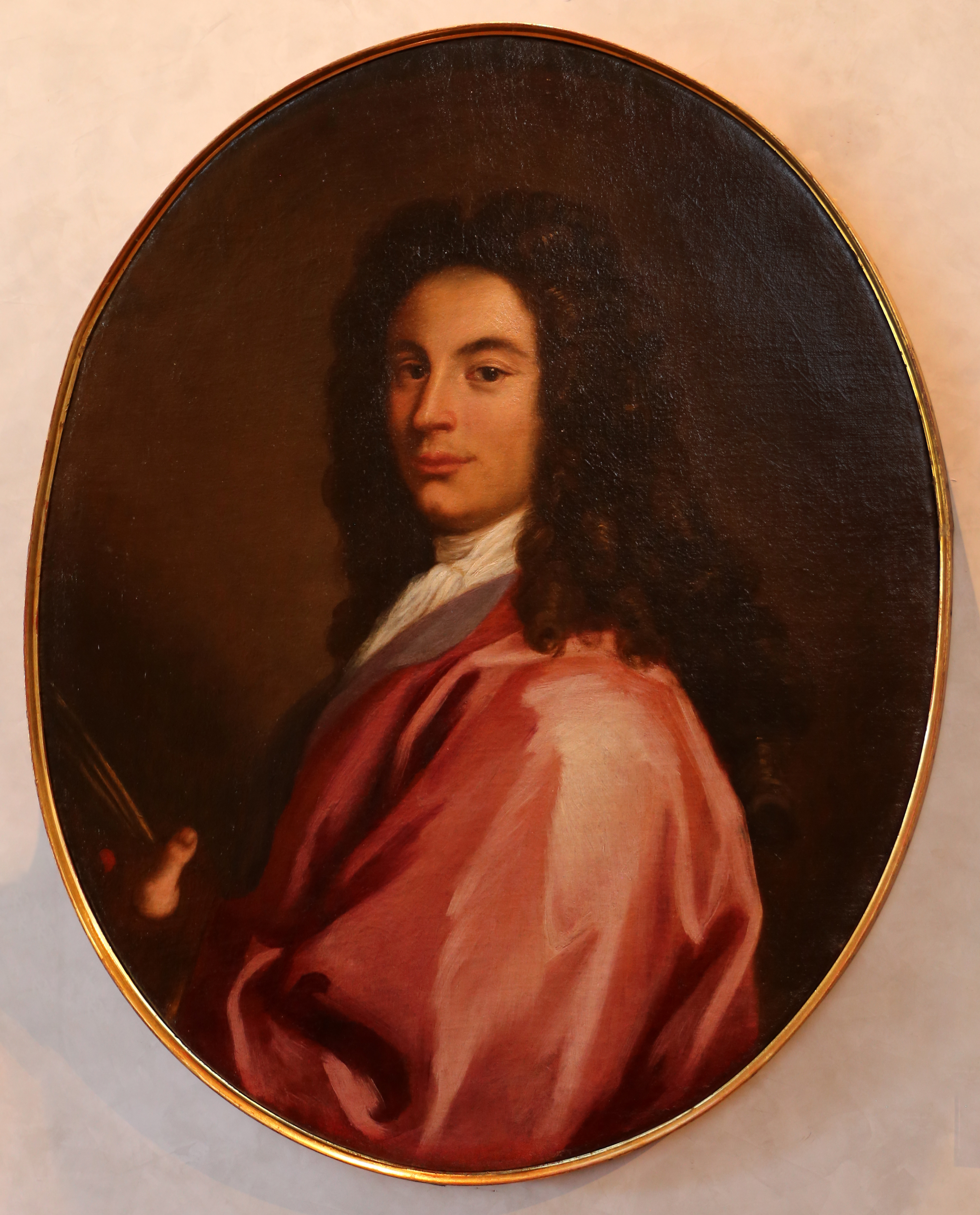
- Self-portrait, Castelvecchio Museum, Verona
- Born: 12 August 1666; Verona, Republic of Venice
- Died: 21 April 1740 (aged 73); Verona, Republic of Venice
- Education: Antonio Bellucci; Carlo Maratta
- Known for: Painting
- Movement: Late Baroque

Antonio Balestra (12 August 1666 – 21 April 1740) was an Italian painter of the Rococo period.

== Biography ==
Born in Verona, he first apprenticed there with Giovanni Zeffio. By 1690 he moved to Venice, where he worked for three years under Antonio Bellucci, then moved to Bologna and then to paint in Carlo Maratta's workshop in Rome. In 1694, he won a prize from the Accademia di San Luca. Balestra was intent on studying further the work of Titian and Paolo Veronese, and he was back in Venice by 1697; in that year he sent an altarpiece of the Annunciation to Santa Teresa degli Scalzi in Verona. The solidity of the forms, sculpturally modelled by intense chiaroscuro, is made yet bolder by Balestra’s use of olio cotto, a technique that has resulted in the darkening of many of his canvases and that has flattened out the volumes of large areas of drapery. The figures are arranged in a zigzagging diagonal across the surface of the canvas; this compositional device was developed by Balestra in his middle years and became characteristic of the 18th-century Venetian altarpiece. The Virgin, who reflects the elegance of those painted by Maratta, is clad in a frosty pink robe, a buff-coloured veil and a mantle of ultramarine that recalls Giovanni Battista Gaulli, whose work Balestra had seen in Rome. The red hue of the garment remained prominent in his palette; the blue-violet and pale wine hues are indebted to the Bolognese school.

Before returning to Verona in 1701, Balestra made a journey through the Emilia and Lombardy, visiting Bologna, Modena, Parma, Piacenza and Milan, where he admired the art of the Carracci but regarded Correggio as supreme. His Annunciation (1702; San Tomaso Becket, Verona) reinterprets, with a new grace and exquisite colour, his own Scalzi Annunciation and shows the influence of his years in Venice. In this work, colour rhythmically reinforces Rococo C- and S-curves, which wind upward. Ochre is still used in the ornate prie-dieu, the swirling lines of which reverberate in the fluttering gold mantle of the angel. Flesh tones are sleek ivory blushed with rose. The cold pink of the Virgin’s robe and the blue of her mantle, no longer the ultramarine of Gaulli but a deeper blue with icy highlights, point away from the Baroque.

Centaur Chiron Receiving the Infant Achilles, London, Hampton Court Palace, Royal Collection

From 1702 to 1710 Balestra was once more in Venice, and between 1710 and 1718 he travelled between Verona and Venice. He acquired noble Venetian patrons, but his fame also spread beyond Venice, and he painted five pictures for Stefano Conti and contributed to Raimondi Buonaccorsi’s Galleria dell'Eneide at Macerata. He refused invitations to the court of Johann Wilhelm, Elector Palatine, yet sent paintings to Düsseldorf; two allegories (1715; Pommersfelden, Schloss Weißenstein) were among a number of history paintings acquired by Lothar Franz von Schönborn, Elector of Mainz. Balestra’s Centaur Chiron Receiving the Infant Achilles and its pendant, Vulcan Giving Thetis Armour for Achilles (both c. 1715; London, Hampton Court Palace, Royal Collection), are characteristic of his mythological paintings of this period, with solid, clearly drawn figures, parallel to the plane, and light colours. The Martyrdom of Saints Cosmas and Damian (1718; Padua, Santa Giustina), a turbulent, theatrical work, suggests the influence of Luca Giordano and Francesco Solimena.

In 1718 Balestra settled in Verona. He complained that overwork had affected his health, yet he continued to paint. The lively play of diagonals and the vivid colour of the Miracle of Saint Dominic (1721; Verona, Castelvecchio Museum) epitomize his style in the 1720s. He fulfilled commissions for patrons in Innsbruck and England and in 1727 gained election to the Accademia di San Luca, Rome.

Balestra’s late period, which began about 1733, is typified by compositions that have moved away from the lively serpentine lines of the Rococo and reverted to Baroque groupings. The Virgin and Child with Saint Francis de Sales (1736; Santa Maria della Pace, Brescia) retains an upward movement yet lacks the grace of the Scalzi Annunciation. The beauty of Balestra’s late work depends on its exquisite chromatic rhythm, created from deep blues, scarlets and reds and interrupted only by a few subtle earth tones. His activity did not decline, and in 1735 he accepted commissions from Johann Matthias von der Schulenburg. Balestra’s most remarkable achievement in the 1730s was the painting of two facing frescoes, Achilles Slain by Paris and Helen Abducted by Paris (1738), for the great Salon of the family villa of Alessandro Pompei at Illasi, near Verona. The works strongly reflect the growing taste for Neoclassicism; figures are reduced to a minimum, landscape elements are simple and monumental, action is restrained and emotion is contained. Balestra retained his characteristic colours, but the tones are lighter and clearer than in earlier paintings.

Many of Balestra’s pictures were engraved by such artists as Johann Jakob Frey the Elder and Pietro Antonio Rotari. His correspondence with Niccolò Gabburri reveals his interest in engraving, and he himself made a number of prints. Such etchings as his Two Warriors reveal the influence of Salvator Rosa and Stefano della Bella. In his last years Balestra upheld the academic tradition, fearing that young painters would succumb to Venetian painterliness. Yet he had himself contributed to this movement, and Sebastiano Ricci and Giovanni Battista Tiepolo perfected the most innovative aspects of his art.

== Legacy and assessment ==
Balestra was an influential teacher and numbered among his pupils Pietro Rotari, Giambettino Cignaroli, Giuseppe Nogari, Carlo Salis and Pietro Longhi. His influence is recognizable in the work of several painters of the Venetian school, including Mattia Bortoloni, Angelo Trevisani and Giambattista Pittoni. In painting, Balestra was staid and reactionary. Wittkower quotes his distaste for the tendency of then-modern painters to deviate from enshrined standards of academic art:

All the present evil derives from the pernicious habit, generally accepted, of working from the imagination without having first learned how to draw after good models and compose in accordance with good maxims. No longer does one see young artists studying the antique; on the contrary, we have come to a point where such study is derided as useless and obnoxious.

== Works ==
=== Paintings ===
The Holy Spirit, Angels, and the Virgin Mary with Saints Mark, Stanislaus Kostka, Aloysius Gonzaga, and Francesco Borgia, National Gallery of Denmark, Copenhagen

- David and Goliath, Accademia Carrara, Bergamo
- The Holy Family, National Gallery Prague
- Portrait of Doge Alvise III, Doge's Palace, Venice
- Adoration of the Magi (1707), Jalinch Collection, Zagreb
- The Annunciation, San Tomaso Becket, Verona
- Madonna and Saints, Church of Santa Maria in Organo, Verona
- Saint Oswald, Church of San Stae, Venice
- Apollo and Midas, Palazzo Pizzini, Rovereto
- Vision of the Virgin, alongside St Joseph, granting the scapular to Blessed Simone Stock (around 1725) San Marco in San Girolamo, Vicenza
- San Luigi Gonzaga in preghiera davanti alla Vergine (1745), Basilica of San Luigi Gonzaga, Castiglione delle Stiviere
- The Prophet Isaiah, Castelvecchio Museum, Verona
- Saint Francis in Ecstasy, Castelvecchio Museum, Verona
- Madonna with Saints Andrew and Gregory (1734), San Gregorio Magno al Celio, Rome

=== Drawings ===
- The Sacrifice of Isaac, sanguine on blue paper, LACMA, Los Angeles County Fund (54 12.7)
- The Presentation of the Virgin Mary in the Temple, black chalk, pen, dark brown ink, and brown wash, National Gallery of Denmark, Copenhagen

== Gallery ==
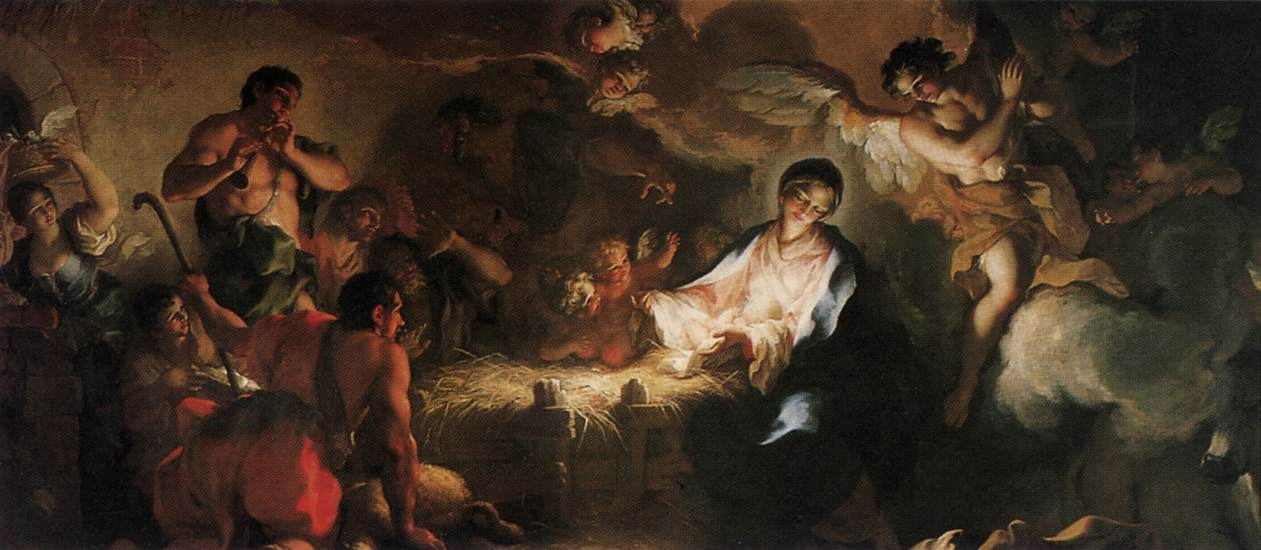
Adoration of Shepherds, 1707, San Zaccaria, Venice

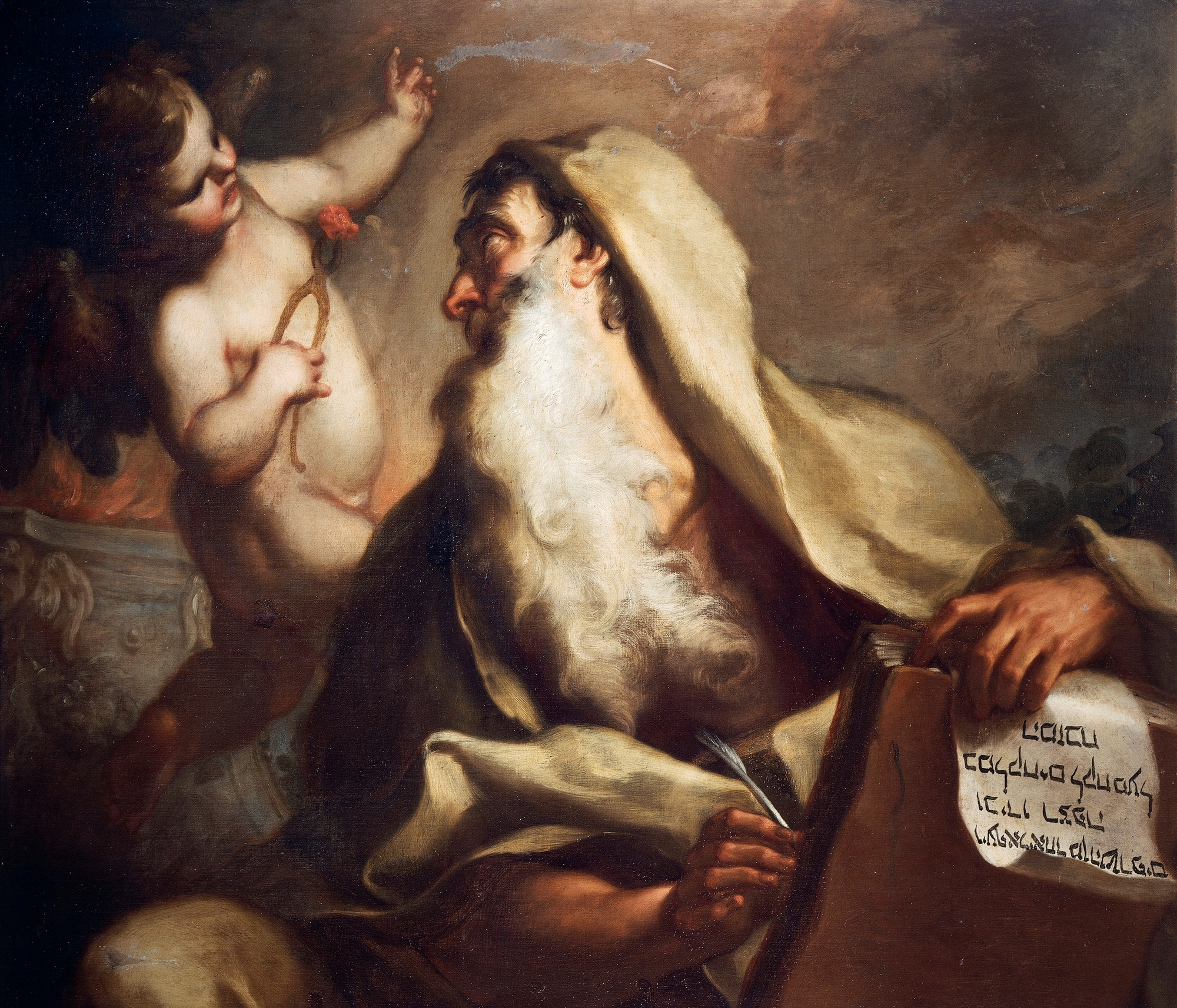
The Prophet Isaiah, Castelvecchio Museum, Verona

The Adoration of the Kings, Hospitalfield House, Arbroath, Angus, Scotland

Vulcan Giving Thetis Armour for Achilles, London, Hampton Court Palace, Royal Collection

Justice and Peace Embracing, Kelvingrove Art Gallery and Museum, Glasgow

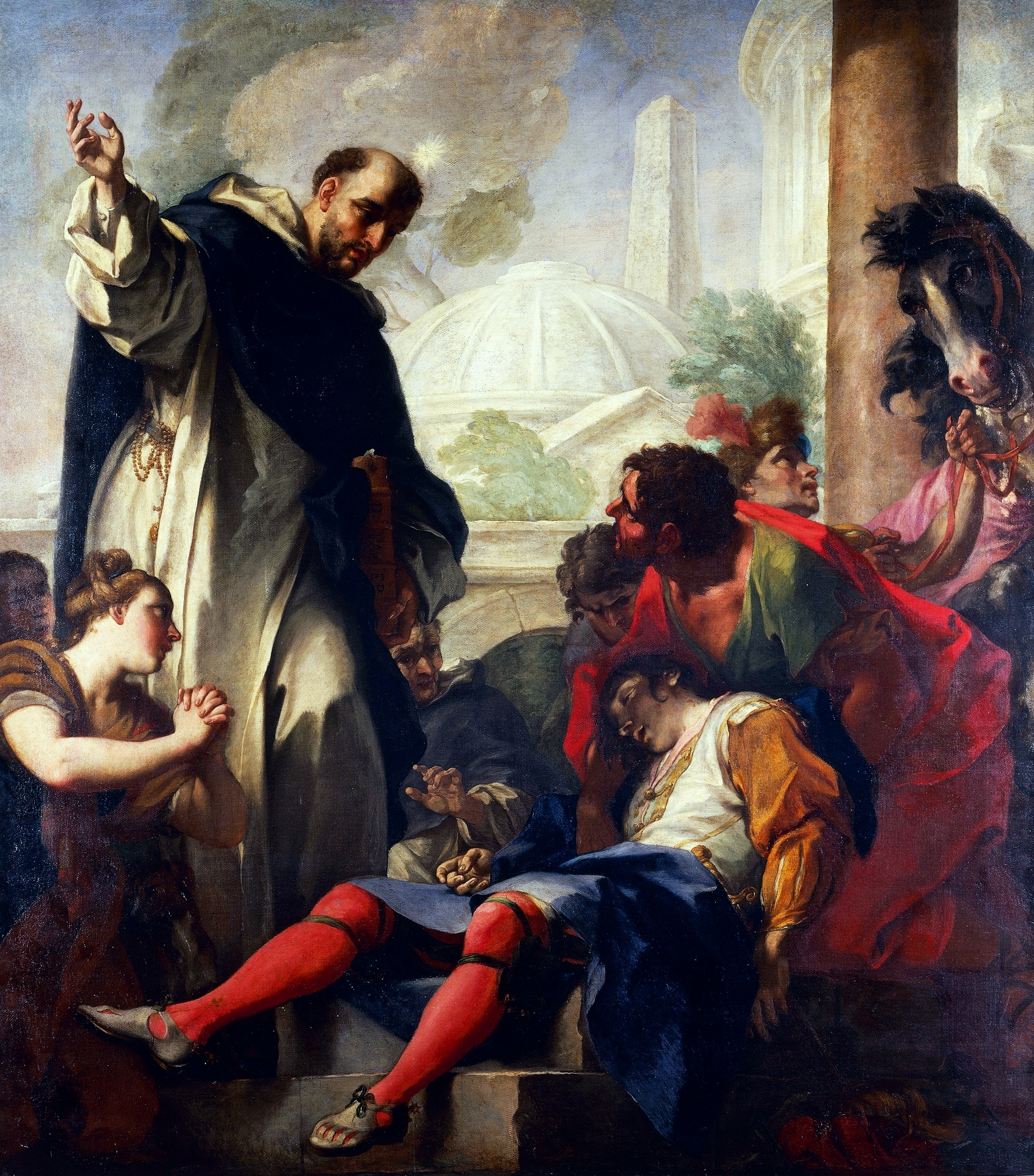
Miracle of Saint Dominic, Castelvecchio Museum, Verona

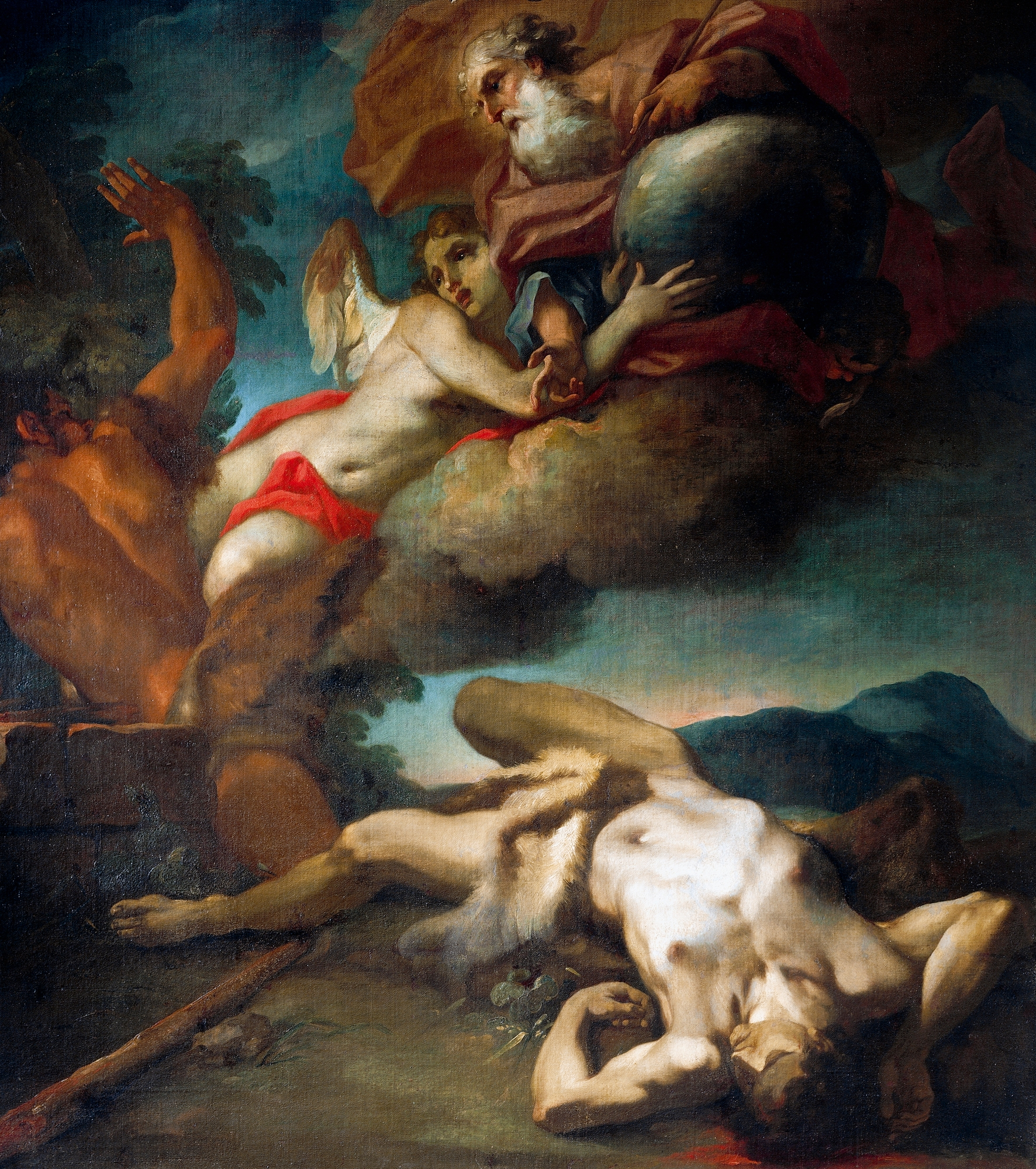
The Soul of Abel Ascends to Heaven, Castelvecchio Museum, Verona

Holy Family, Slovak National Gallery

== Sources ==
- Bernasconi, Cesare (1864). Studj sopra la storia della pittura italiana dei secoli XIV e XV e della scuola pittorica veronese dai medj tempi fino a tutto il secolo XVIII. Verona: Antonio Rossi.
- Bryan, Michael (1886). Robert Edmund Graves (ed.). Dictionary of Painters and Engravers, Biographical and Critical. London: George Bell and Sons. pp. 73–74.
- Wittkower, Rudolph (1980). Art and Architecture in Italy, 1600-1750. Penguin Books. pp. 461, 483–484.
- Fossaluzza, Giorgio (1997). "Antonio Arrigoni "pittore in istoria", tra Molinari, Ricci, Balestra e Pittoni". Saggi e memorie di storia dell'arte. 21: 157–216. JSTOR 43140008.
- Ruggeri, Ugo (1999). "Nuove opere documentate di Antonio Balestra". In G.M. Pilo (ed.). Pittura veneziana dal Quattrocento al Settecento: studi di storia dell'arte in onore di Egidio Martini. Venice: Arsenale. pp. 187–190. ISBN 978-8877432223.
