= Alessandro Marchesini =

Italian painter (1664–1738)

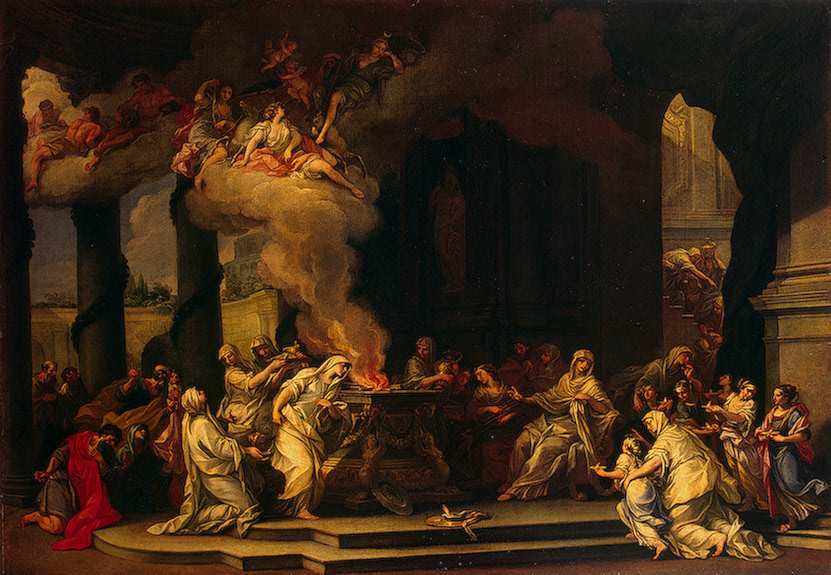
- Dedication of a New Vestal Virgin, Hermitage Museum, Saint Petersburg
- Born: April 30, 1664; Verona, Republic of Venice (now Italy)
- Died: 27 January 1738 (aged 73); Verona, Republic of Venice (now Italy)
- Known for: Painting
- Movement: Baroque; Rococo

Alessandro Marchesini (30 April 1664 – 27 January 1738) was an Italian painter and art merchant of the late-Baroque and Rococo, active in Northern Italy and Venice.

== Biography ==
Alessandro Marchesini was born in Verona. He first trained in Verona with Biagio Falcieri and then with Antonio Calza. He then moved to Bologna, to work in the studio of Carlo Cignani. He is described as gaining fame for his allegories with small figures. In 1700 Marchesini moved to Venice, where he painted two works for San Silvestro. He remained in Venice until 1737 and specialized in making small-scale copies of works by the Old Masters to decorate private houses, thereby imitating a wide variety of styles.

His most memorable independent works are the two paintings of Christ Blessing the Little Children (1708; Bologna, priv. col.), which attain the light elegance of the Emilian late Baroque. His later Triumph of Apollo (after 1720; Pommersfelden, Schloss Weißenstein) reveals, in its radiant colours and the airiness of its composition, his development of an international Rococo style. Marchesini was also active as an agent and adviser, notably to the Lucchese art collector Stefano Conti, who in 1725 acquired four paintings by Canaletto on Marchesini’s recommendation. Among his pupils is Carlo Salis.

Paintings by Alessandro Marchesini

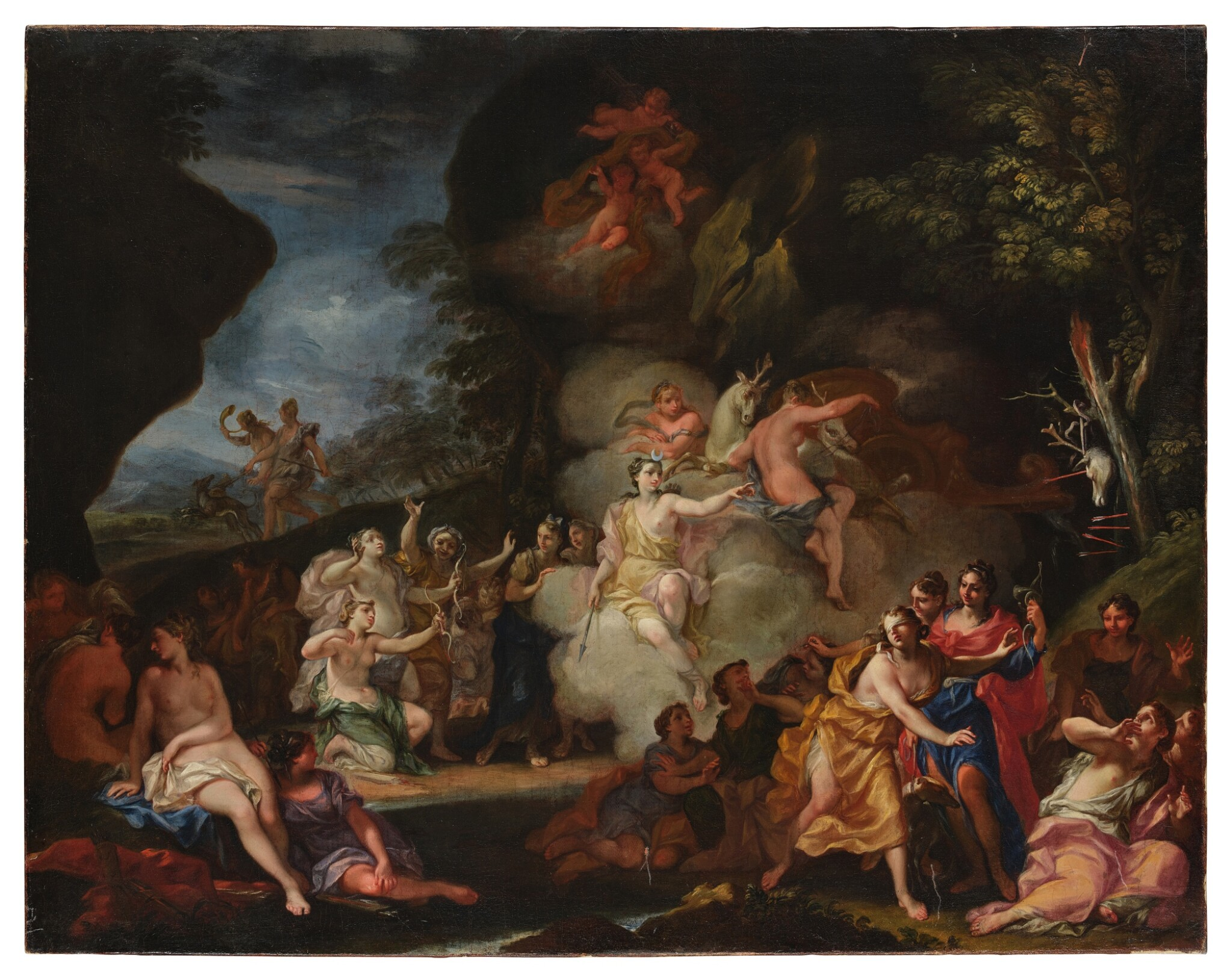
Bath of Diana, priv. col.

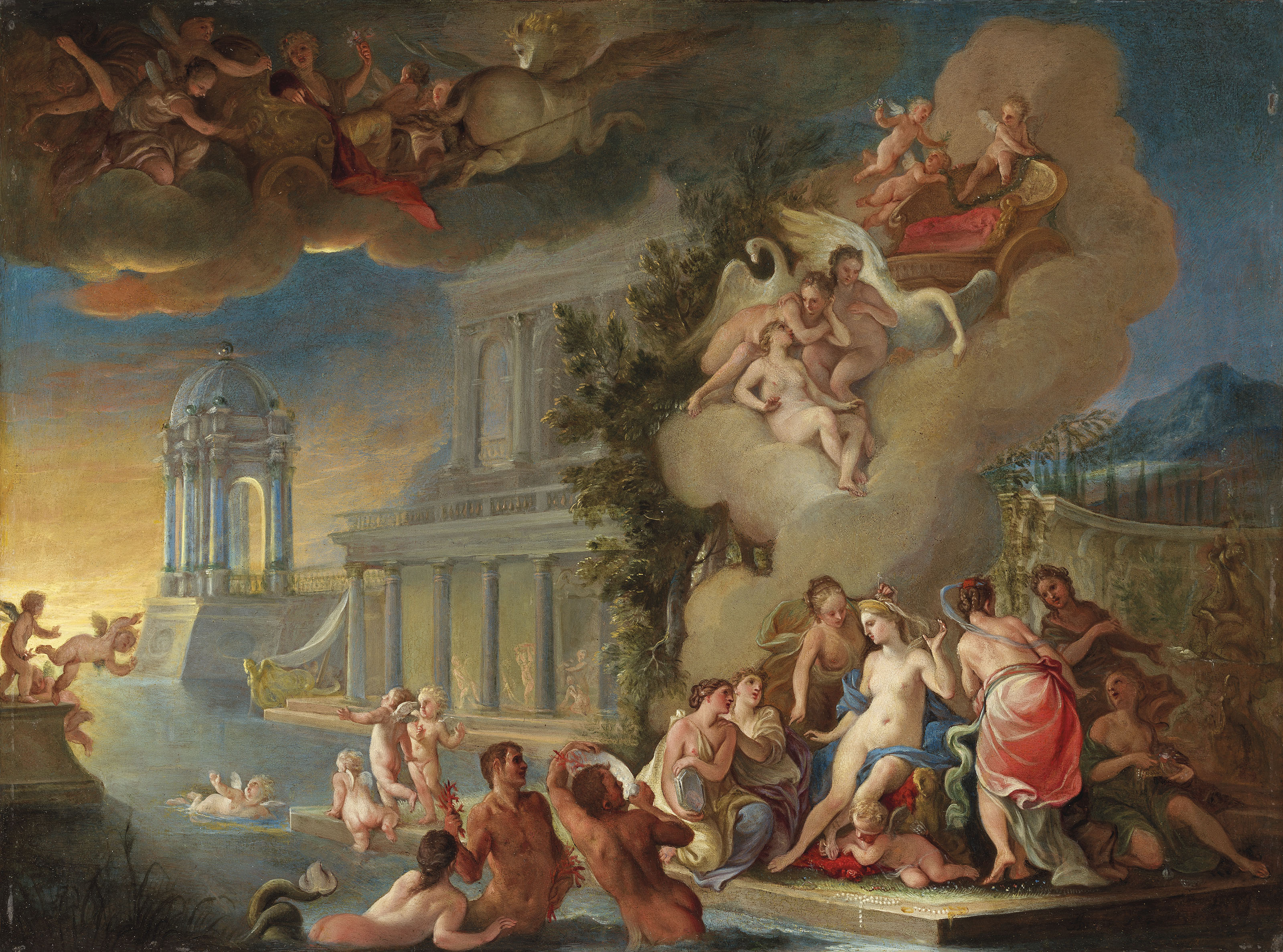
The Toilet of Venus, priv. col.

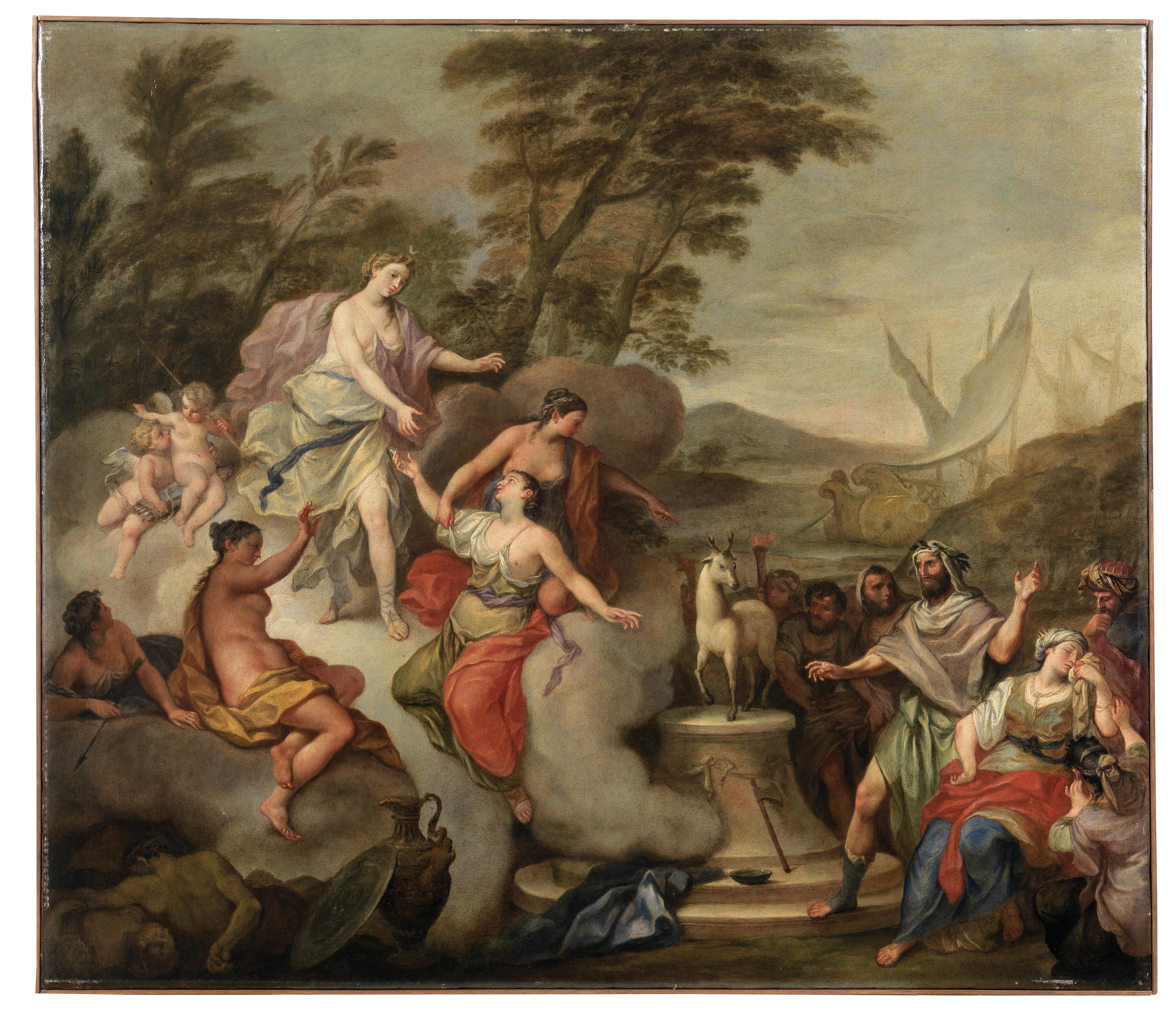
The Sacrifice of Iphigenia, priv. col.

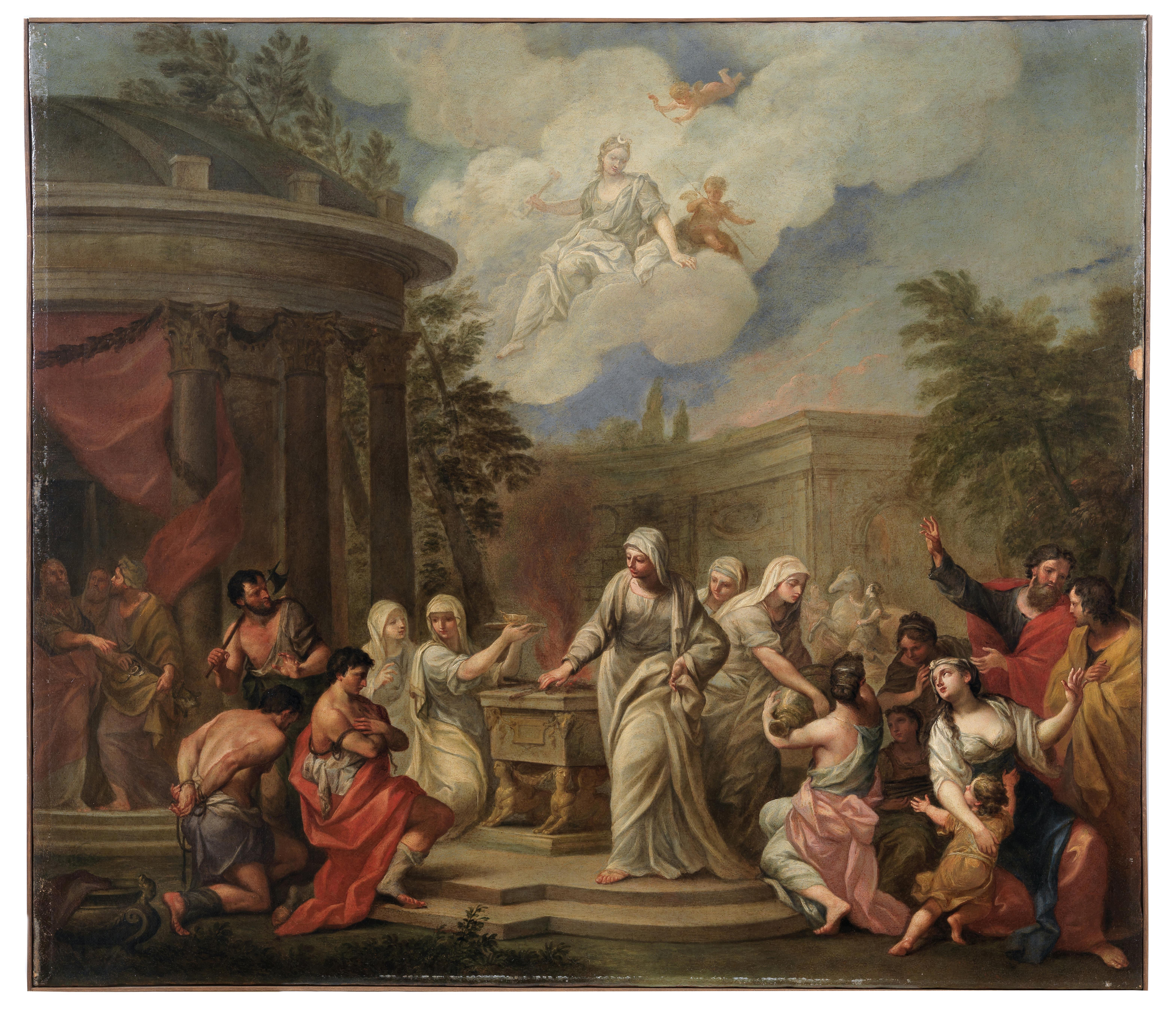
Iphigenia in Tauris, priv. col.

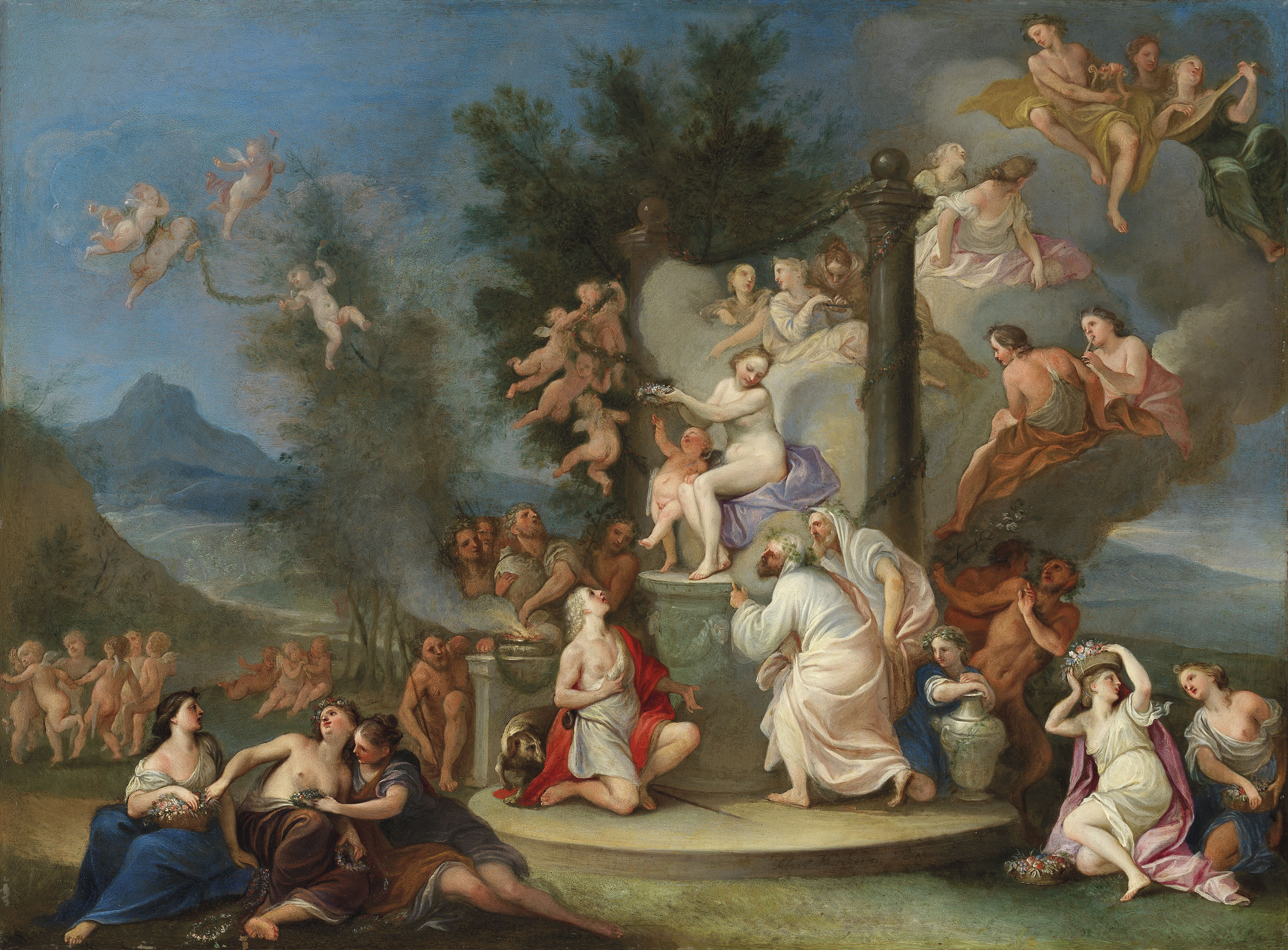
Diana and Endymion, priv. col.

== Sources ==
- Bernasconi, Cesare (1864). Studi sopra la storia della pittura italiana dei secoli XIV e XV e della scuola pittorica veronese dai medi tempi fino tutto il secolo XVIII. Verona: A. Rossi.
- Farquhar, Maria (1855). R.N. Wornum (ed.). Biographical catalogue of the principal Italian painters, by a lady. Woodfall & Kinder, Angel Court, Skinner Street, London. p. 96.
