= Carlo Salis =

Italian painter

Carlo Salis (1680–1763) was an Italian painter of the Baroque period. Born in Verona. He was initially a pupil of the painter Alessandro Marchesini, then went to work under Giovanni Gioseffo dal Sole and later with Antonio Balestra in Venice.
