= Dionigi Valesi =

Italian printmaker

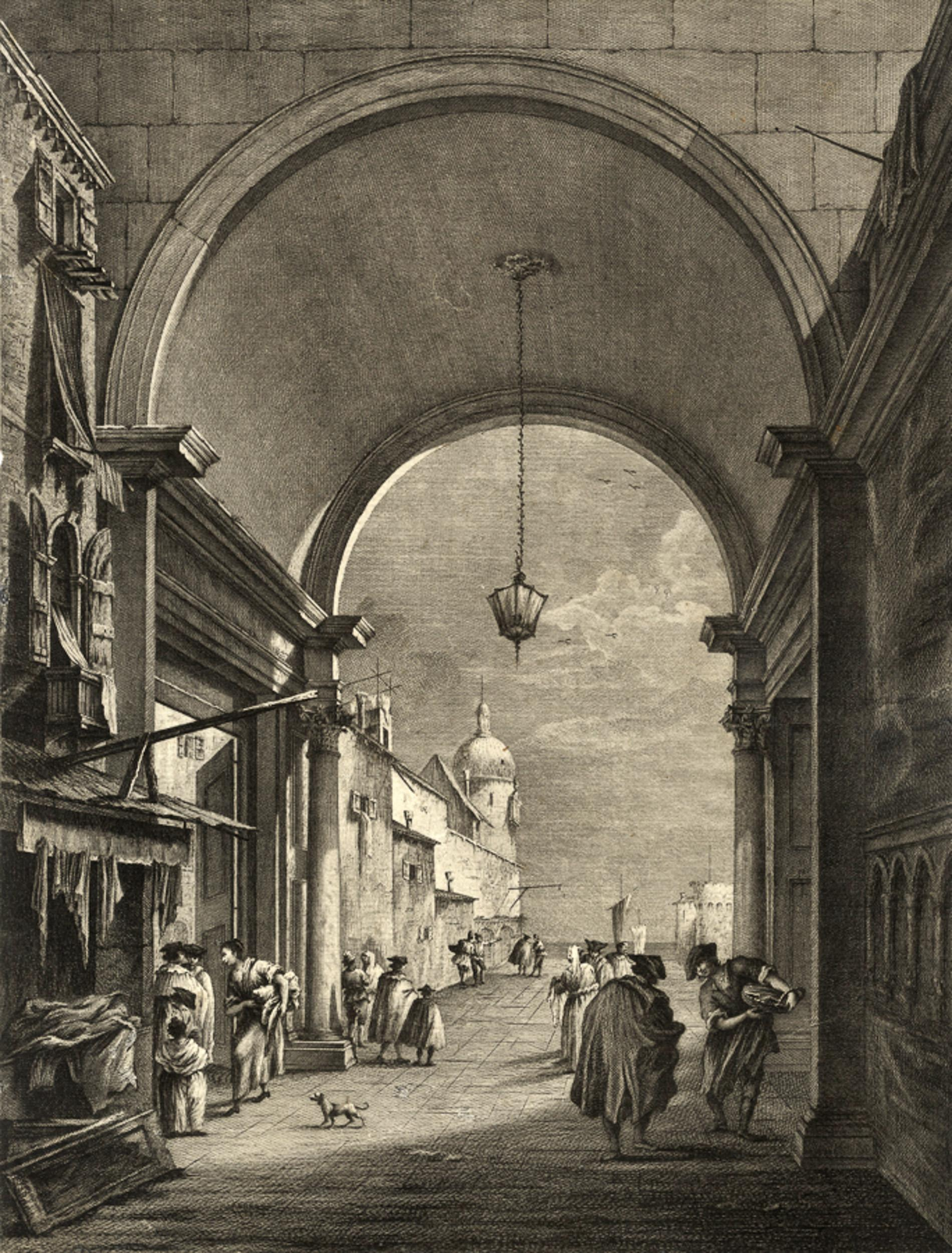
- Capriccio (after Gualdi), c. 1778
- Born: c. 1730; Parma, Duchy of Parma
- Died: c. 1780; Venice, Republic of Venice
- Known for: Printmaking
- Movement: Neoclassicism

Dionigi Valesi (c. 1730 – c. 1780) was an Italian printmaker active in Verona and Venice.

== Biography ==
Valesi was born in Parma. He worked in Verona and Venice, where he produced etchings and engravings of sacred and secular subjects after Veronese, Francesco Guardi, Francesco Battaglioli, Pietro Antonio Rotari and Adriano Cristofali, among others. His most renowned prints are three Venetian views: the Grand Canal at Riva di Biasio, the Island of San Giorgio Maggiore and an architectural capriccio. All three are derived from Guardi and were executed c. 1778 for the Venetian bookseller–publisher Marchiò Gabrieli. Valesi also engraved a Map of the City of Verona Showing the Flood of 2 December 1752, various portraits of notable Venetian citizens, and illustrations for books. He collaborated with other artists on a Road to Calvary, with a rich decorative border, which was published (c. 1778) by the Bassano branch of the Remondini printing and publishing firm. Valesi died in Venice around 1780.

== Works ==
- After Guardi, The Grand Canal at Riva di Biasio, The Island of S Giorgio Maggiore and an architectural capriccio (c.1778)
- Map of the City of Verona Showing the Flood of 2 December 1752

== Sources ==
- Art Encyclopedia. The Concise Grove Dictionary of Art., 2002
