= Stefano Conti =

Italian merchant

- Born: 17th century
- Died: 18th century
- Occupations: Merchant; art collector
- Agent: Alessandro Marchesini
- Known for: Patronage of contemporary Italian artists; extensive documented art collection

Stefano Conti was an Italian 18th century merchant from Lucca, known for his expansive collection and patronage of contemporary Italian artists. He began his collection at age 50 in 1705, and utilized Alessandro Marchesini as his agent in Venice.

While his collection is now dispersed, it is notable because all his purchases were recorded, including price and a description of the art-work by the artist. He also demanded that the subject of each painting be novel, and not a copy of an existing painting.

Among the artists he collected were Canaletto, Luca Carlevaris, Gregorio Lazzarini, Sebastiano Bombelli, and Antonio Franchi.
