= Pietro Rotari =

Italian painter (1707–1762)

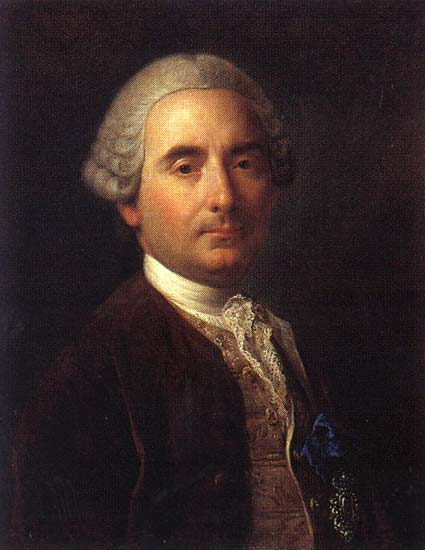
- Self-portrait, c. 1756
- Born: Pietro Antonio Rotari; 30 September 1707; Verona, Republic of Venice
- Died: 31 August 1762 (aged 55); Saint Petersburg, Russia

Pietro Antonio Rotari (30 September 1707 – 31 August 1762) was an Italian painter of the Baroque period. Born in Verona, he led a peripatetic career, and died in Saint Petersburg, where he had traveled to paint for the Russian court. His portraits, mostly of women, are renowned for being beautiful and realistic. Rotari's works were generally limited to royal portraits held by notables such as emperors and court ladies.

== Biography ==
He was initially a pupil of Antonio Balestra, but moved and lived in Venice from 1725 to 1727. He then joined the studio of Francesco Trevisani in Rome (1728–1732). Between 1731 and 1734, he worked with Francesco Solimena in Naples. He then returned then to Verona, where he started a studio. In 1750, he had moved to Vienna. In 1756, he was invited to Russia by the court of the Tsarina Elizabetta Petrovna. From there he moved to Dresden and to work with the court of Augustus III of Poland. He returned to St Petersburg to work with the court of Catherine II.

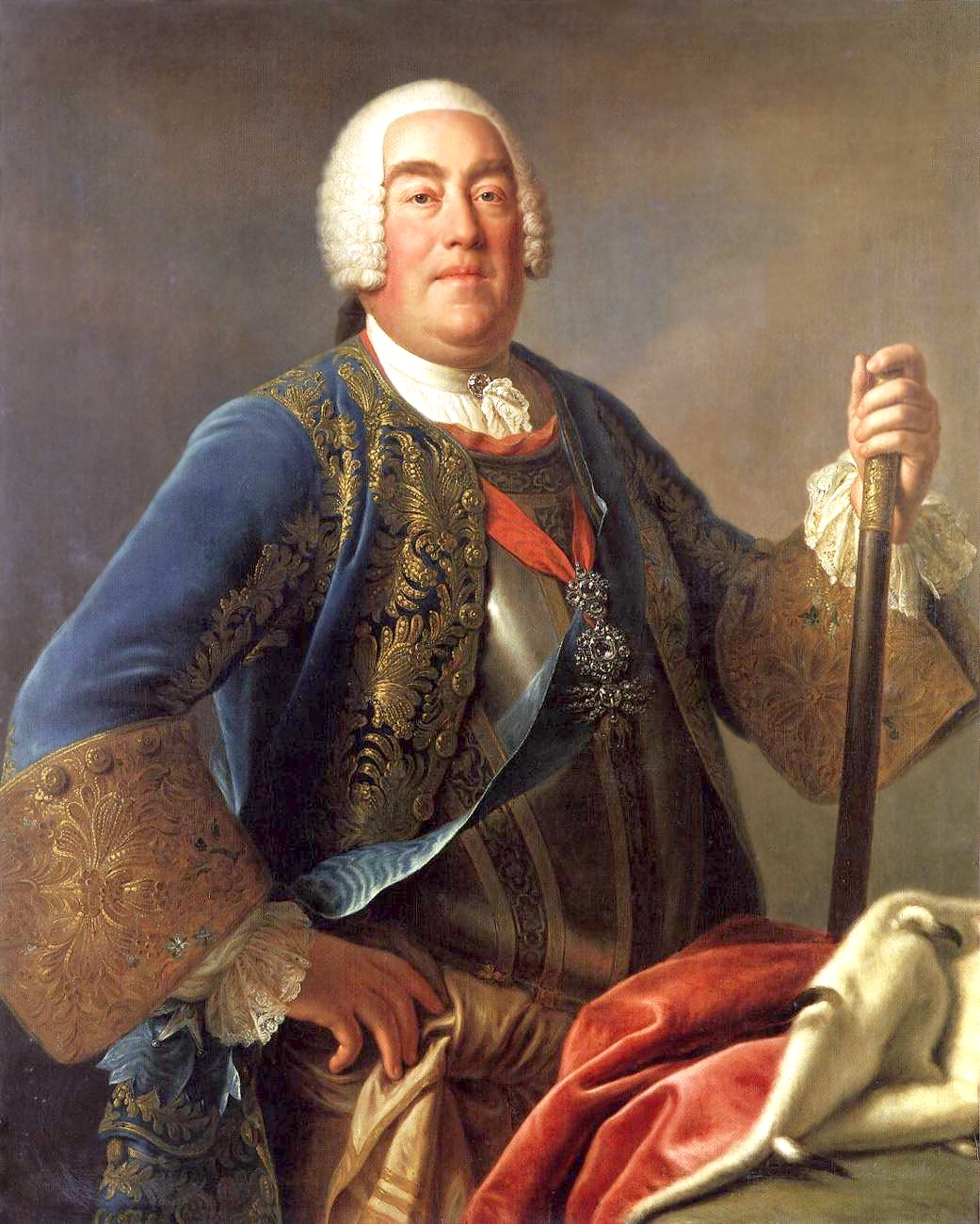
Portrait of King Augustus III of Poland, by Rotari, 1750s

He was much in demand as a portraitist, and painted royal families in Dresden and Saint Petersburg. He also painted the multi-figured altarpieces of the Four Martyrs (1745) for the church of the Ospedale di San Giacomo in Verona. He also painted an altarpiece of San Giorgio tempted to sacricifice to the Idols (1743) for the church of the same name in Reggio-Emilia, and an Annunciation (1738) for the main altar for the church of the Annunziata in Guastalla.

== Gallery ==
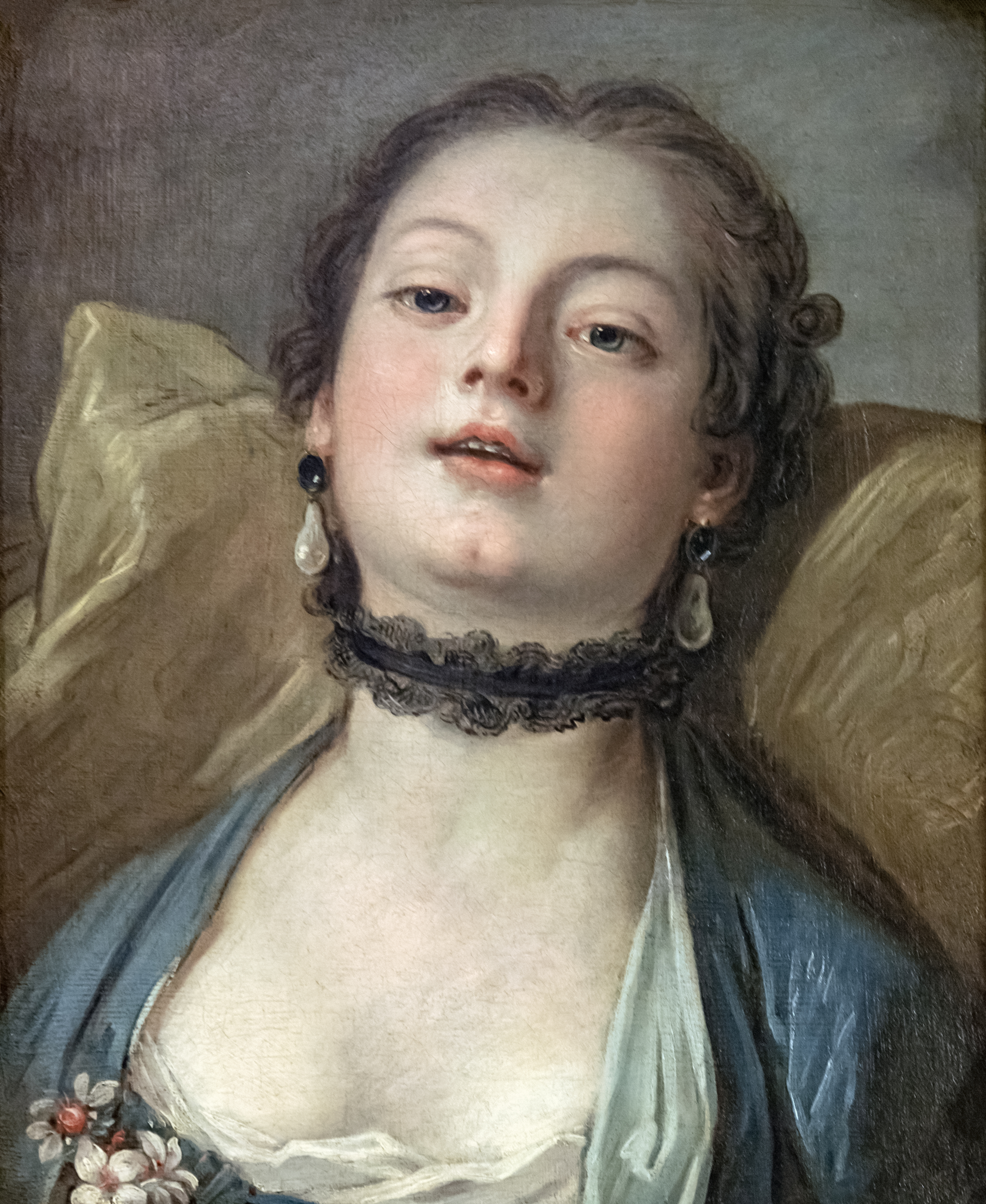
Portrait of a Woman Foundation Bemberg

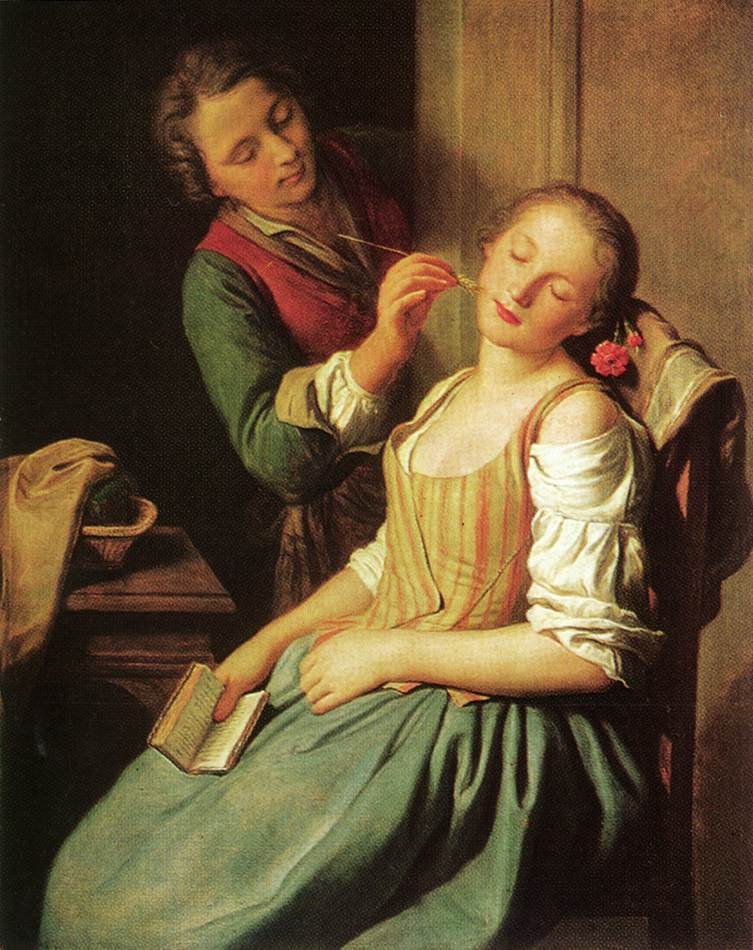
A Sleeping Woman

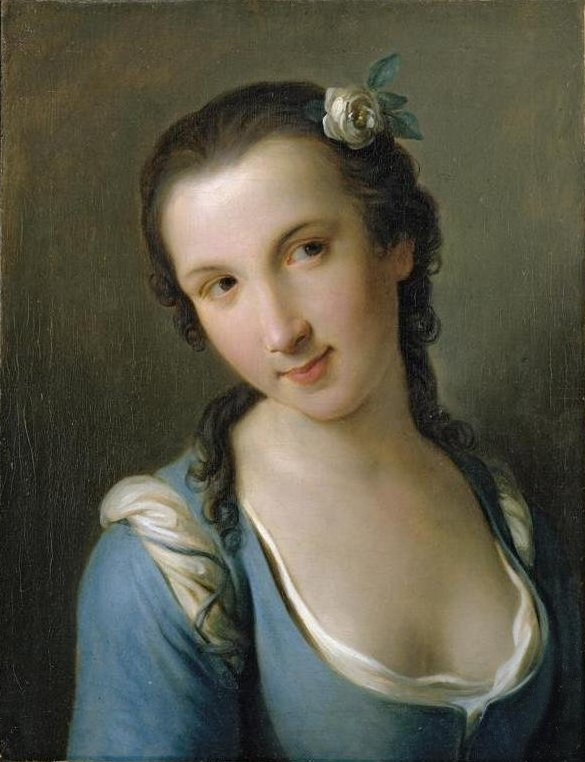
A Young Woman with Blue Dress

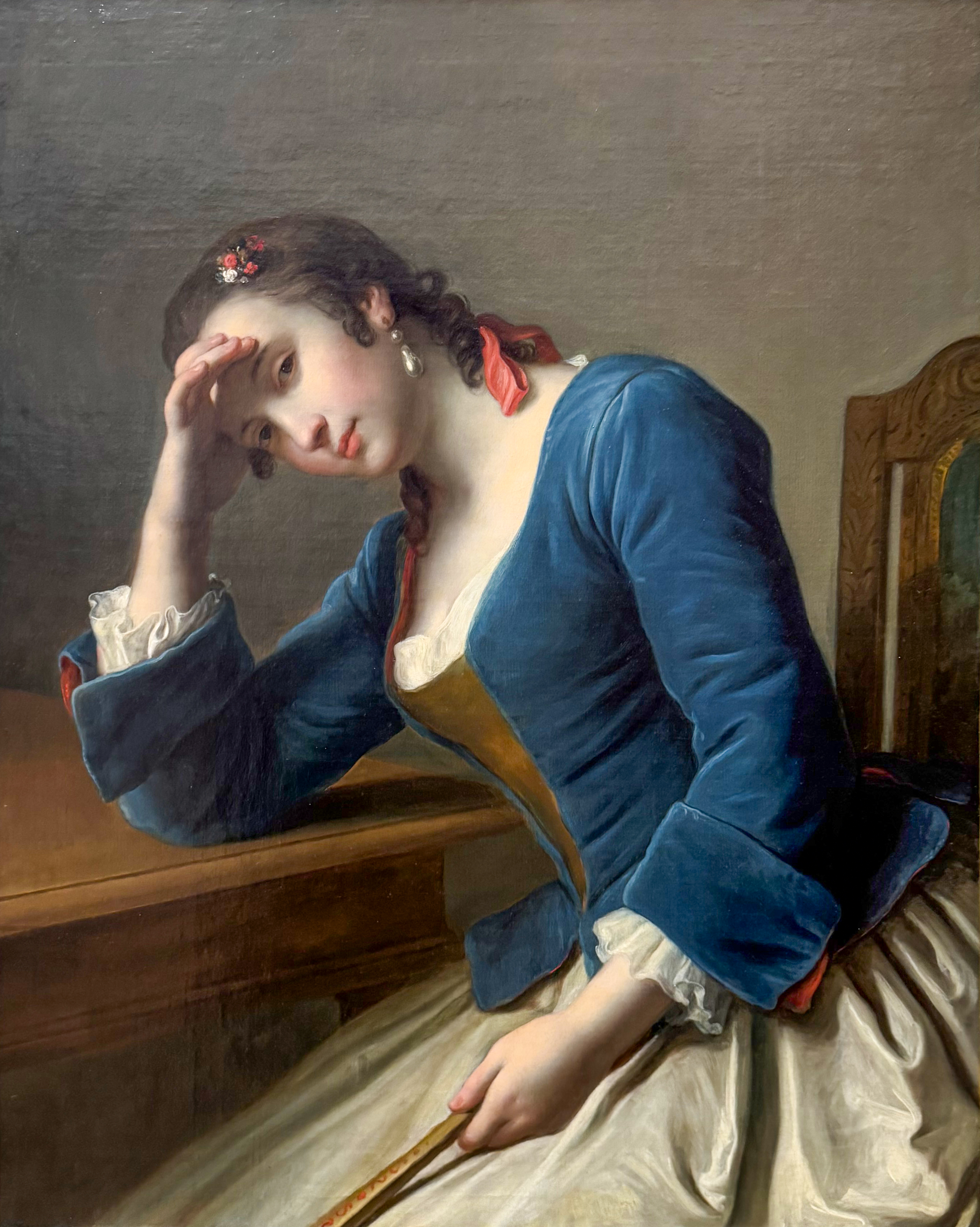
A Young Woman with a Fan

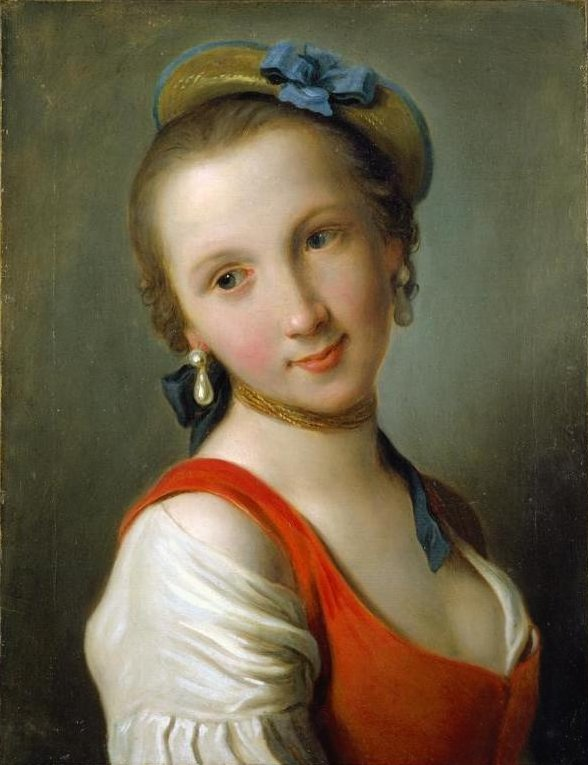
A Young Woman with Red Dress

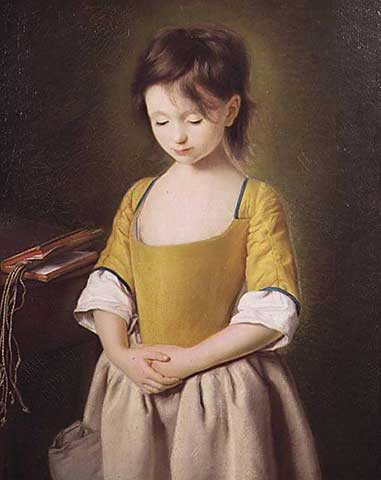
Portrait of a Young Girl

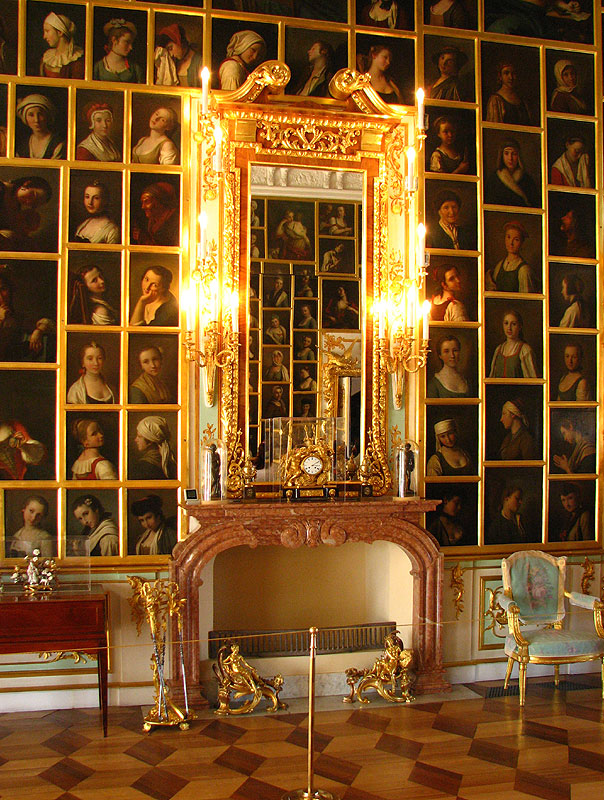
368 Portraits of girls at Rotari Hall in Peterhoff, Saint- Petersburg
