= Milanese Baroque =

Aspects of the Baroque style in Milan

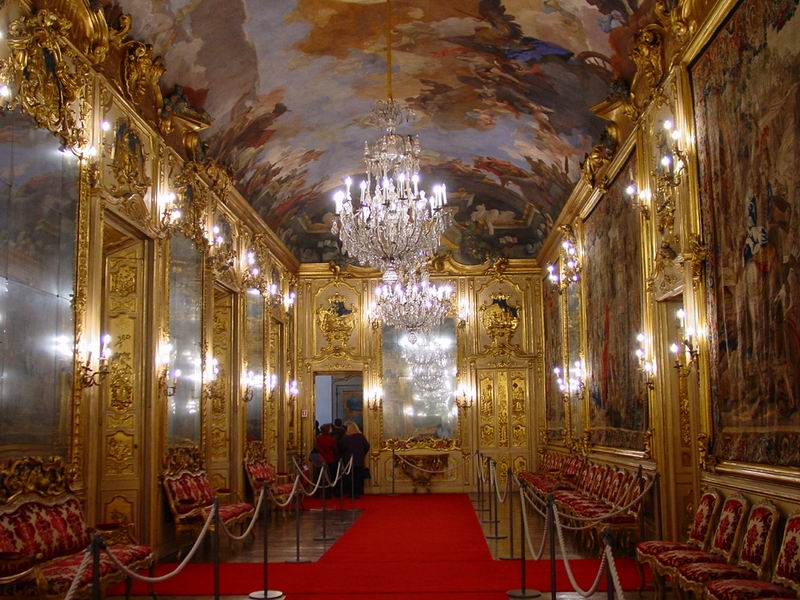
Tapestry gallery with frescoes by Tiepolo in Palazzo Clerici: one of the most significant interiors in Milan's Baroque landscape

Milanese Baroque refers to the dominant artistic style between the 17th century and the first half of the 18th century in the city. Due to the work of the Borromeo cardinals and its importance in the Italian domains, at first Spanish and then Austrian, Milan experienced a lively artistic season in which it assumed the role of the driving force behind Lombard Baroque.

== General features ==
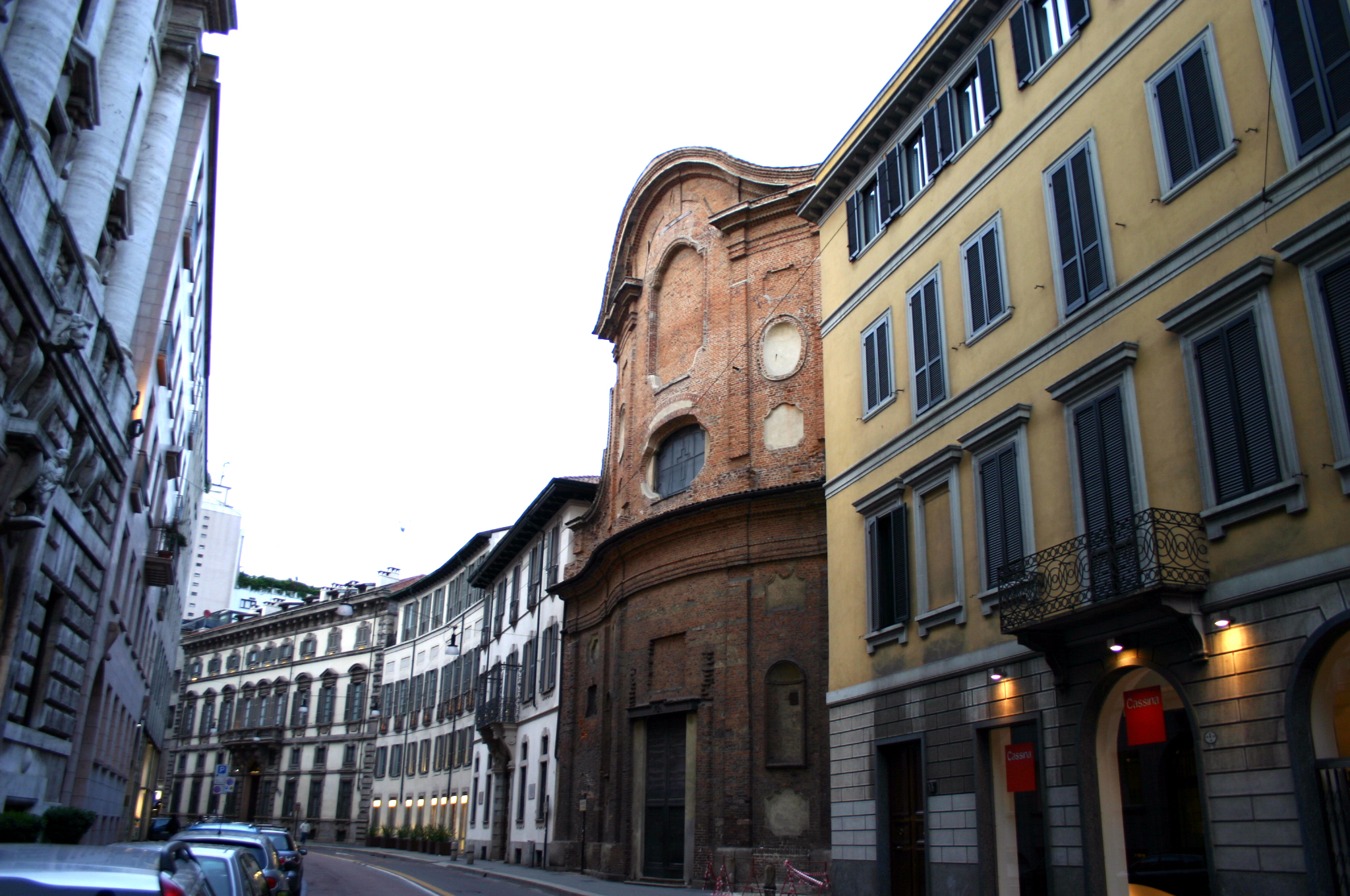
Via Durini in Milan: Palazzo Durini, Casa Toscanini and the church of Santa Maria della Sanità

The Milanese Baroque period can be divided into three parts: the early 17th century, the second 17th century and the 18th century. The first 17th century began with the appointment of Federico Borromeo as bishop of Milan in 1595 in continuity with the work of his cousin Charles: in this first phase the main exponents of Milanese painting were a trio, Giovan Battista Crespi, known as Cerano, Giulio Cesare Procaccini and Pier Francesco Mazzucchelli, known as Morazzone. In this first phase, the evolution of the new Baroque style followed with continuity the late Mannerist art that was widespread in Milan at the time of Charles Borromeo; in fact, the formation of the three painters took place on the models of Tuscan and Roman late Mannerism for Cerano and Morazzone, while Procaccini was formed on Emilian models. From an architectural point of view, religious commissions dominated the scene, as the Spanish rule was more concerned with works of military rather than civil utility; many pre-existing churches were completely rebuilt and decorated in a Baroque style, and just as many were built from scratch: while the Baroque style was introduced in Milan by Lorenzo Binago, there were two other main architects who shared the scene at the time, namely Fabio Mangone, with his more classical lines and for this reason often chosen for commissions by Federico Borromeo, and Francesco Maria Richini known simply as il Richini, with his lines more inspired by the early Roman Baroque. Beyond this dualism, Richini represents the leading figure of architect in 17th-century Milan, and to find such a prestigious figure in Milanese architecture one would have to wait until the advent of Giuseppe Piermarini.

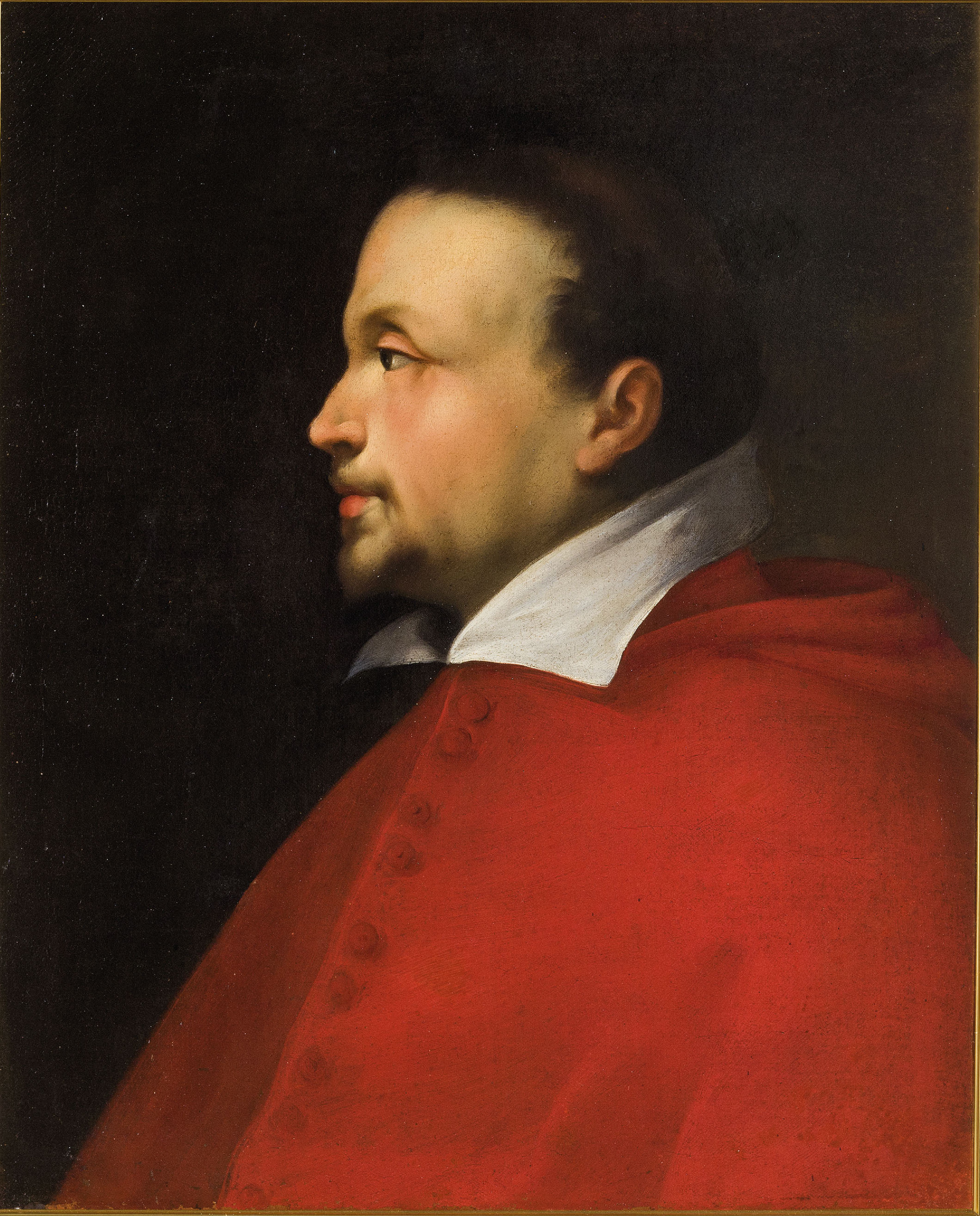
Giulio Cesare Procaccini – Portrait of Federico Borromeo (c. 1610–1625), priv. col.

The second phase of the Baroque, which began approximately after the early 1730s, started after a brief interlude filled with significant events: firstly, the main interpreters of the movement died between 1625 (Giulio Cesare Procaccini) and 1632 (Cerano), to which was added the death of Cardinal Federico Borromeo, one of the major figures of 17th century Lombardy, and above all the Great Plague of Milan, which halved the city's population, killing among the thousands of victims the promising young Milanese painter Daniele Crespi, which among other things led to the closure of the Accademia Ambrosiana, founded in 1621 by Federico Borromeo to train young artists for the Milanese school, where he hired the greatest interpreters of the early Baroque, above all Cerano and Fabio Mangone, as teachers.

Painting in the second half of the 17th century was thus completely renovated in its interpreters, with the work of the brothers Giuseppe and Carlo Francesco Nuvolone, Francesco Cairo, Giovan Battista Discepoli and others; a fundamental role was played both by the Accademia Ambrosiana, which gave a certain continuity of style and then reopened a few years later, and by the work of artists from the rest of Italy from the Emilian, Genoese and Venetian schools. Architecture, with the death of Fabio Magone, saw the work of Francesco Richini, who remained almost unrivalled in his Milanese production, joined by minor interpreters such as Gerolamo Quadrio and Carlo Buzzi. Thanks to the latter, the achievements of this period made a complete break with Mannerist influences, moving towards a markedly Baroque approach, with influences from the Emilian, Genoese and Roman schools. The last quarter of the century saw the opening of the second Accademia Ambrosiana, reopened in 1669 under the direction of Antonio Busca, a pupil of Carlo Francesco Nuvolone, and Dionigi Bussola, who together with the newly founded Accademia Milanese di San Luca, linked to the Roman academy of the same name, contributed to the return of a classicist current linked to the Bolognese and Roman schools.

The 18th century represents the last Baroque phase; the style did not blossom openly into Rococo due to the normative action of the Milanese College of Engineers-Architects and there was a change of trend: religious commissions no longer played the main role in Milan's artistic scene, but gave way to the ville di delizia in the Milanese countryside and the return of the large private urban building sites: the liveliness of the construction sites led to a greater number of outstanding performers, including Giovanni Battista Quadrio, Carlo Federico Pietrasanta, Bartolomeo Bolla, Carlo Giuseppe Merlo and Francesco Croce, to which was added the Roman Giovanni Ruggeri, who was very active throughout Lombardy. In painting, the works of Giambattista Tiepolo stand out for history painting and Alessandro Magnasco for genre painting, both of whom were not from Lombardy: this phase marked a change in the preferences of patrons, who preferred artists from a non-Lombard school, above all the Veneto school, considered more prestigious at the time. In the late 18th century there was a period in which the lines of the Baroque were mitigated by the impending neoclassicism, until the Milanese Baroque season came to an end with the painter Francesco Londonio, at whose death in 1783 the city of Milan was already in the midst of the Age of Enlightenment, in the height of the Neoclassical season.

== The early 17th century ==
The first part of the 17th century represents the transitional period between Mannerism and the first stages of the Baroque, although there is no lack of already mature examples of Baroque style at the time. For this particular period, in which the legacy of Charles Borromeo was still strong and in which the interests of the Spanish government focused more on military and strategic aspects, religious art and architecture led the transition to the new Baroque style.

=== The Ambrosiana ===
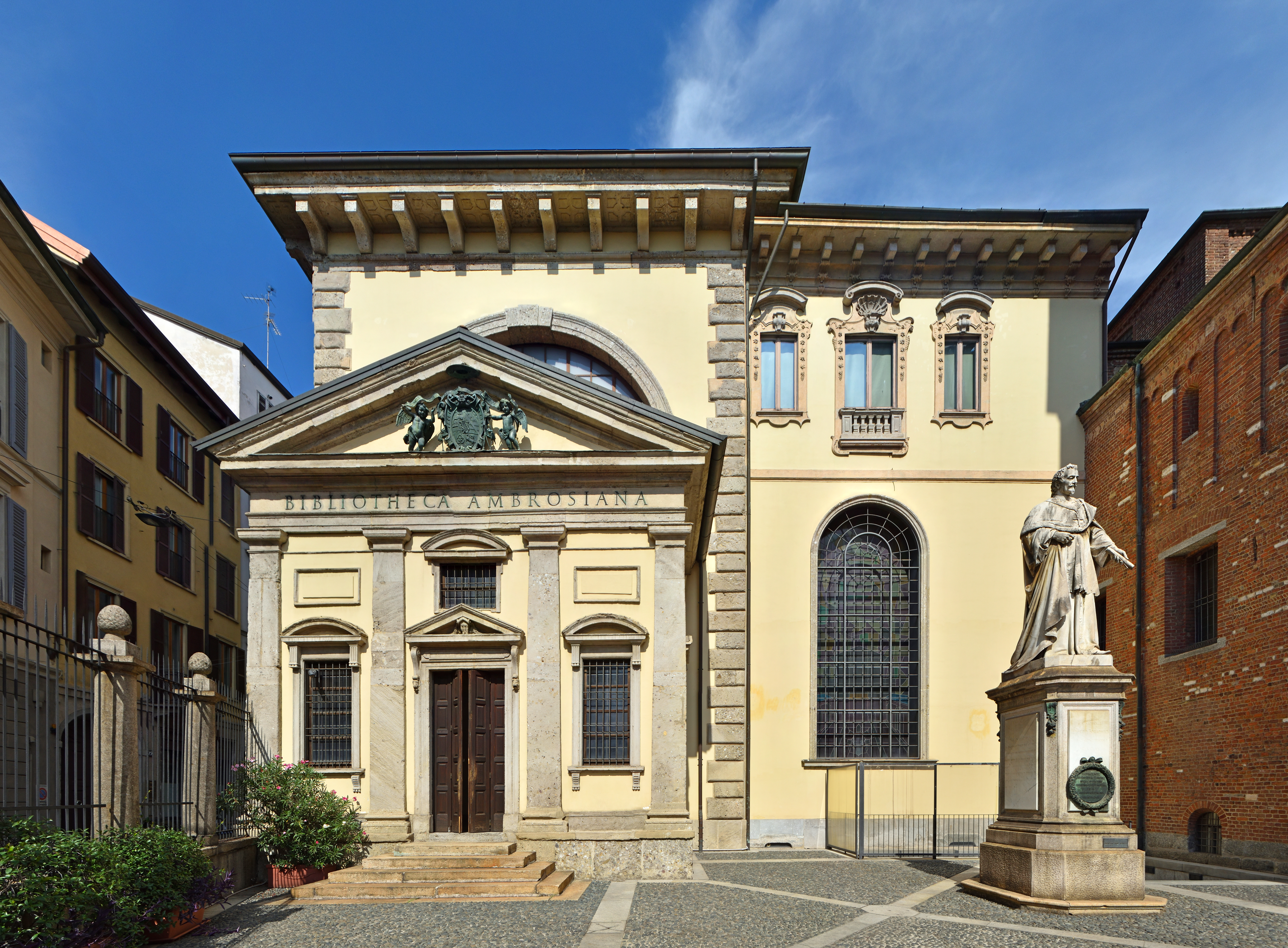
Ambrosiana Vestibule

Federico Borromeo was one of the main promoters of Lombard culture and art in the years of his cardinalate: the cardinal's Roman education had a great influence on this, during which he came into contact with the best artists of the time, becoming a passionate art lover and collector. From his interest arose the idea of creating a cultural centre for the city to train artists and men of letters according to the canons of the Counter-Reformation, to whom paintings and texts would be made available, as well as teachers, in order to promote art and culture within the city.

Work on the complex began in 1603: after purchasing and demolishing a residential building in the area of Piazza San Sepolcro, the plans for the Palazzo dell'Ambrosiana were assigned to the architect Lelio Buzzi, who started work the same year; the work, which lasted among various modifications until 1630, passed to Alessandro Tesauro and finally to Fabio Mangone. The façade was completed in 1609: the entrance towards the centre consists of a vestibule divided by three bays of Doric pilasters that end on the architrave, in which the inscription BIBLIOTHECA AMBROGIANA is engraved; the Borromeo coat of arms is sculpted on a triangular tympanum that crowns the vestibule. Many of Borromeo's contemporaries commented positively on the classical solution of the structure, which was even defined ‘a temple of the muses’ by the theologian Luigi Rossi, praised for the ‘Roman-style vestibule’ and the ‘ancient-style architraved peristyle’ by Giovanni Magenta or compared to the architecture of imperial Rome for its ‘solidity and majesty’ by Girolamo Borsieri.

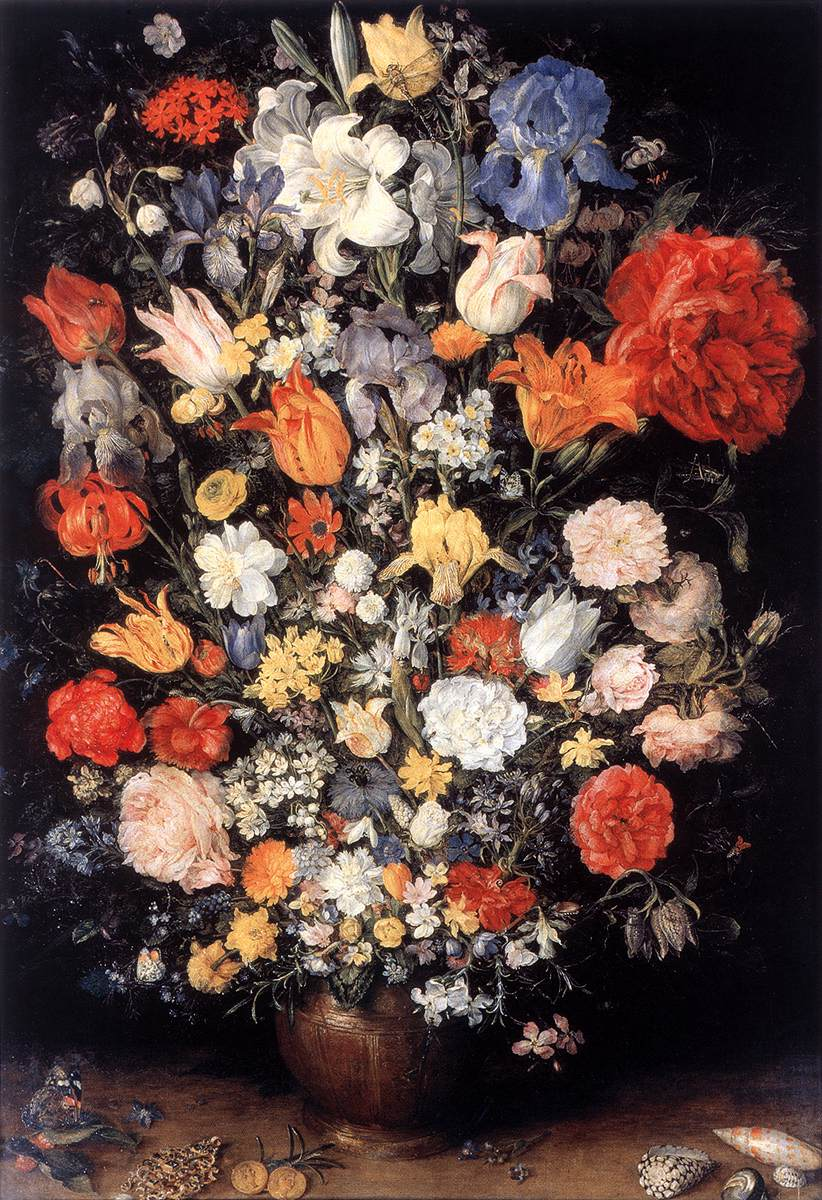
Jan Brueghel - Vase of flowers with jewellery, coins and shells (1606), Pinacoteca Ambrosiana

The first structure was the library in 1609; at the time of its opening it counted fifteen thousand manuscripts and thirty thousand printed works, many of which had previously belonged to Cardinal Borromeo's vast private collection, which included items from Europe and Asia: it was one of the first public libraries in Europe, and the library activity was complemented by a printing works and a school for the study of classical and oriental languages; this was the first step towards the creation of the Ambrosiana's vast cultural and museum centre.

The second structure to make its appearance was the Museo Ambrosiano, forerunner of today's Pinacoteca Ambrosiana, in 1618, created from Cardinal Borromeo's private collection of paintings, prints, sculptures and drawings of various kinds: the initial collection comprised 172 works, almost half of which had stories from the Christian tradition or devotional themes as their subject. This fact should not come as a surprise since it was in agreement with Borromeo's Tridentine doctrine, which attributed a fundamental role to art in the diffusion of the Catholic religion. However, more curious was the cardinal's passion for paintings of a natural character such as still lifes and landscapes, mostly by foreign artists, in whose category could be included less than 30% of the works. Currently owned by the art gallery, the vast collection of 17th-century Lombard painting, which includes canvases by Giulio Cesare Procaccini, Giuseppe Vermiglio, il Morazzone and Carlo Francesco Nuvolone, and the section of Flemish painting with works by Paul Bril and Jan Brueghel the Elder, are of particular note.

The third and last institution to make its appearance was the Accademia Ambrosiana in 1620, a school of fine arts for the training of young artists: although the last, it was the most important of the three, and in fact the library and the art gallery were made to be of special use to its students. The role of the academy was immediately clear; Federico Borromeo wrote in its statute: ‘The present Academy of Painting, Sculpture and Architecture was founded for no other reason than to help artists create works for divine worship better than those currently being made’: its objective was the creation of a school of sacred art, especially of painting, that would instruct the faithful and promote the doctrines of the reformed Catholic Church, particularly described in Borromeo's De pictura sacra.

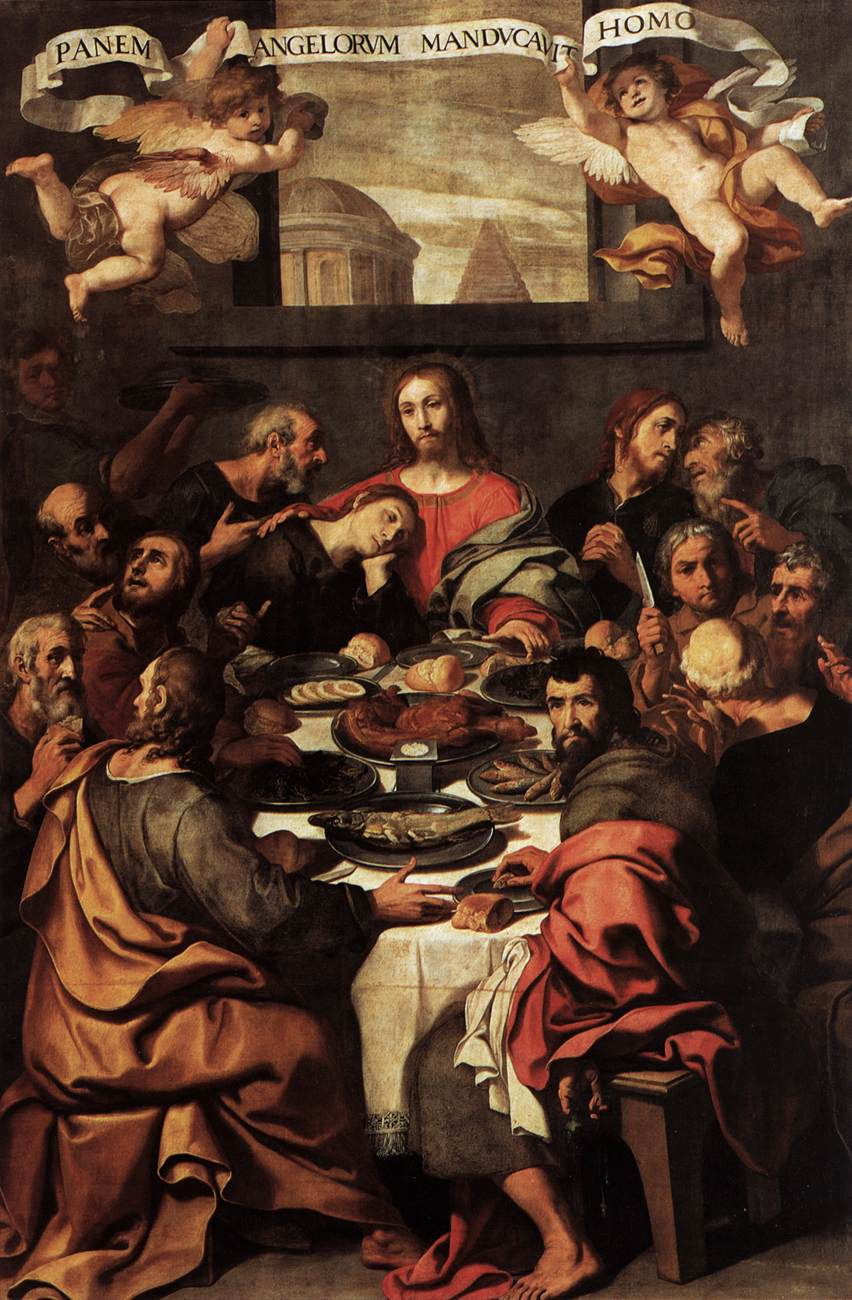
Daniele Crespi – The Last Supper (1625), Pinacoteca di Brera

The late foundation of the academy is due to the fact that in the early 17th century, the Accademia dell'Aurora of the painter Giovanni Battista Galliani was already active in Milan, which however closed in 1611 due to a scandal involving him; whereupon Cardinal Borromeo, having acquired the necessary space to enlarge the Ambrosiana building, began to apply himself to the creation of the new academy, studying the regulations and programmes of the best schools of fine arts of the time, including the Accademia dei Carracci in Bologna, the Accademia del Disegno in Florence and the Roman Academy of San Luca. Once founded, the students' usual programme was to reproduce, under the supervision of the masters, parts of works of various themes from original paintings, drawings and sculptures using different types of techniques and materials: the finished works would then be discussed collectively, and the best ones awarded prizes. While this method was widespread in most academies, the importance given to the study of original works from the academy's gallery, made available to students in far greater numbers, and often of better quality, than in contemporary schools, where it was customary to use copies, prints or works made by the students themselves, was innovative. Among the masters of the three disciplines, the most prominent were Cerano for painting, Gian Andrea Biffi for sculpture and Fabio Mangone for architecture, while there were collaborations with Camillo Procaccini and Morazzone; among the students it is worth mentioning Melchiorre Gherardini, Francesco Morone, Ercole Procaccini the Younger and Daniele Crespi, probably the most gifted of the academy's students.

The academy's life was short, and by the early 1730s the institution could be said to have come to an end, due to the plague, which led to the death of many pupils and teachers, and above all the death of Cardinal Borromeo, although the academy did not officially close. The academy's achievements are controversial: while there is no doubt that it contributed to the training of many young artists, some of great stature such as Crespi, and above all to spreading the canons of Counter-Reformation art, many believe that the academy's overtly religious orientation was its main limitation. The academy enjoyed a brief period of activity in the second half of the 17th century, only to decline again and finally close its doors in 1776.

=== Church of St. Joseph ===
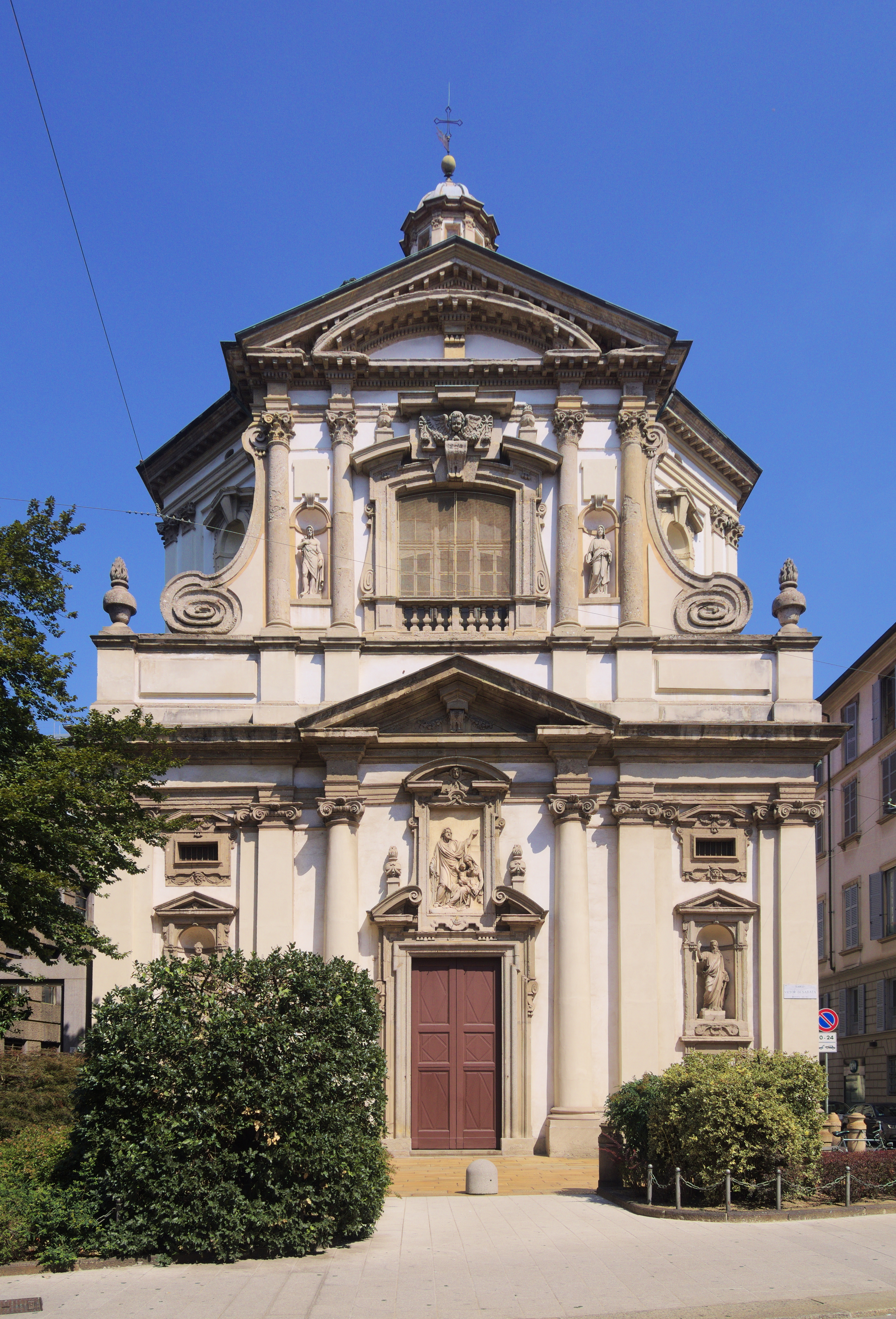
Church of St. Joseph

The church of St. Joseph is considered as one of the most representative buildings of the early Lombard Baroque, as well as one of Richini's masterpieces: the church represents the point of detachment from mannerist architecture, and also served as a prototype for Baroque churches in the use of the longitudinal plan, especially in northern Italy and sometimes in central Europe. The project was entrusted after several transitions to Richini in 1607, who for the first time presented himself as the sole designer of an important building: the reason for the project's innovation is the use of space, i.e. an evolution of the solution used in the church of Sant'Alessandro in Zebedia by Lorenzo Binago, his master. The plan, longitudinal, is formed by the fusion of two spaces with a central plan: the first is octagonal in shape, obtained as a square with rounded corners, on which there are two columns of a giant order supporting small balconies; the second space, which houses the presbytery, is slightly smaller and is square in shape, flanked by two side chapels; the two spaces are joined by an arch that spatially belongs to both spaces, creating a sort of union between the two. For the solution of the giant columns on the corners, Richini was inspired by Pellegrino Tibaldi's church of San Fedele: the evolution consists in the use of a dome roof instead of a ribbed roof, with which he aligned himself with the new trends of the Roman Baroque, while moving in continuity with the Lombard tradition, for which the architect chose an octagonal tiburium.

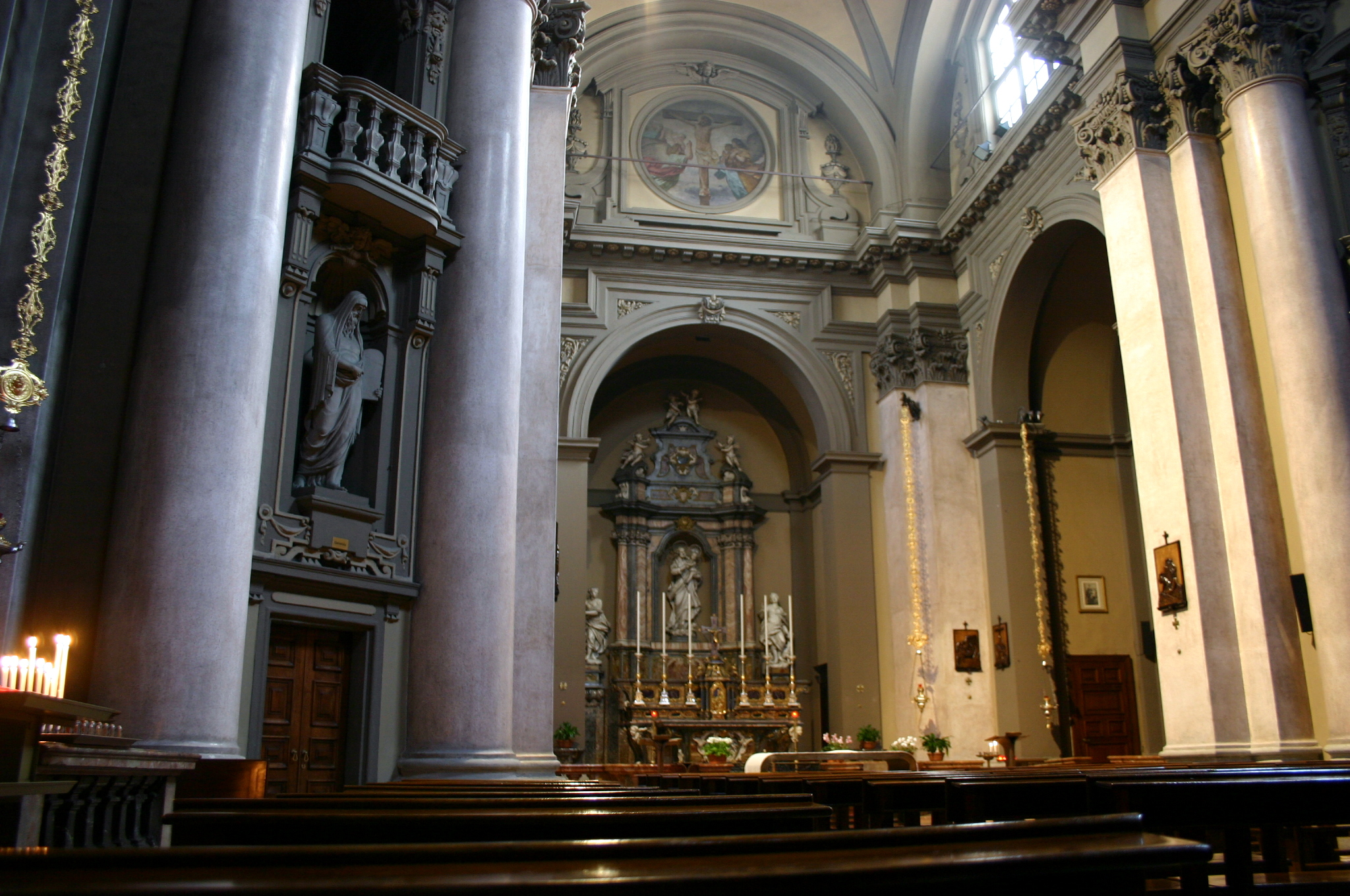
Interior of the church of St. Joseph

The façade is divided into two orders, both marked by lesenes and columns; the lower order is centred on the church's only portal, while on the sides are two niches containing statues; the upper order is connected to the base by two volutes, and ends at the top with a pediment obtained by superimposing a triangular and a curved solution, while the upper order is centred on a large window with elaborate decorations. Again, the façade, clearly inspired by Carlo Maderno's church of Santa Susanna at the Baths of Diocletian, is in line with the emerging Roman Baroque trends. Although the façade at that time was only a prelude to the building and therefore not subject to the same studies as the interior, it constituted one of the most widely used models for Baroque church façades in the years to follow. In the interior, the two main spaces do not assume preponderant proportions and shapes with respect to each other, because Richini not only designed them of similar size, but also took care to provide equal lighting; he also anticipated the dynamism of Baroque art, again with accurate studies on light and with the flooring in the octagonal space with black and white marble slabs arranged concentrically. The church's four altars date back to after the building's inauguration in 1616, the first in chronological order is dedicated to the Death of St. Joseph (1625) and features an altarpiece of the episode painted by Giulio Cesare Procaccini, while the altarpiece of the Marriage of the Virgin by Cerano dates back to 1630, while the frescoes of St. Joseph by Giuseppe Vermiglio, frequently mentioned in 18th-century guides, have been lost.

The other two altars, next to the presbytery, date back to the second half of the 17th century in Milan, and feature the altarpiece of the Preaching of the Baptist, attributed by the majority of critics to Giovanni Stefano Danedi, known as Montalto, while the last altarpiece by Andrea Lanzani dates back to 1675, depicting the Mystery of the Flight into Egypt; in these two altarpieces, compared to the rest of the church, one can see a style that is already markedly Baroque, if not of the early 18th century. Also recorded in the late seventeenth century were the cabinetry works of Giuseppe Garavaglia, son of the more famous Carlo, which, however, were largely lost over the years, of which only the chancel and organ facade remain.

=== Other religious architecture ===
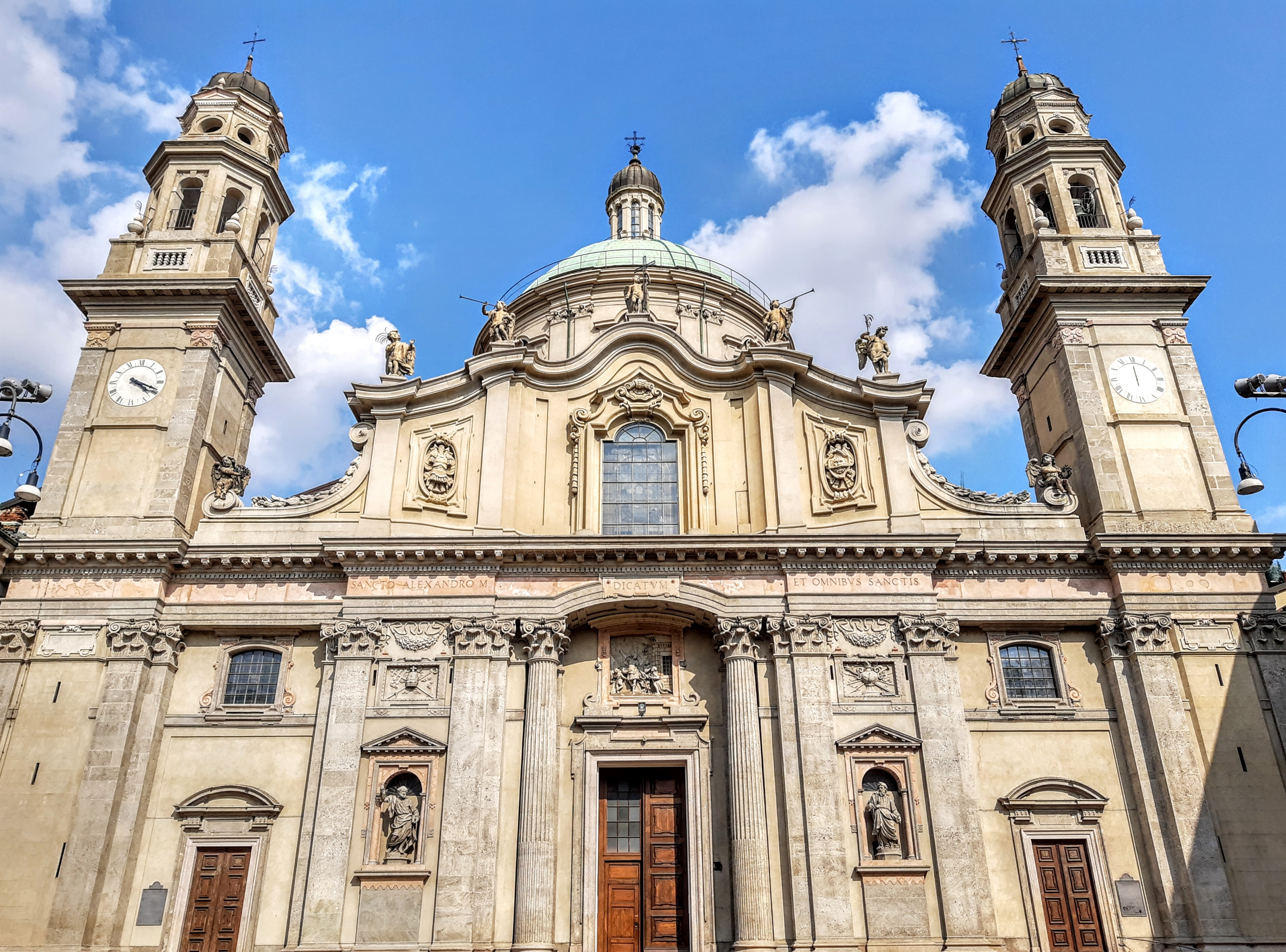
Church of Sant'Alessandro

One of the first Milanese churches in the Baroque style was the church of Sant'Alessandro in Zebedia, whose plans by Lorenzo Binago were approved in 1601: the building sites were finally concluded in 1710 with the construction of the left bell tower. Despite the long protraction of the works, it is thought that in 1611 the works must have been at an already advanced stage, and in fact in that year the feast of St. Charles was celebrated in the building: one of the reasons for the delays in the construction was the signs of subsidence of the dome when the works were completed in 1627, which was then demolished and rebuilt. The church has a combined central and longitudinal plan, that is, the main body assumes a rectangular shape, while the interior has a Greek-cross structure, with the remaining spaces organized into four chapels which are topped by as many small domes and the major dome placed over the center of the Greek-cross plan; the regularity of the rectangular plan is broken by the apse placed at the back of the church.
The facade was built in two different periods: the lower order was completed in 1623 and organized into three portals interspersed with pilasters, the major one in the center of which is introduced by two Corinthian columns supporting a false arch, in which there is a relief of St. Alexander pointing to the church's design by Stefano Sampietri; also on the lower order are the niches containing the statues of St. Peter and St. Paul, also by Sampietri. The upper order was completed in the 18th century to a design by Marcello Zucca, and consists of a mixtilinear pediment, on which statues of putti are arranged.

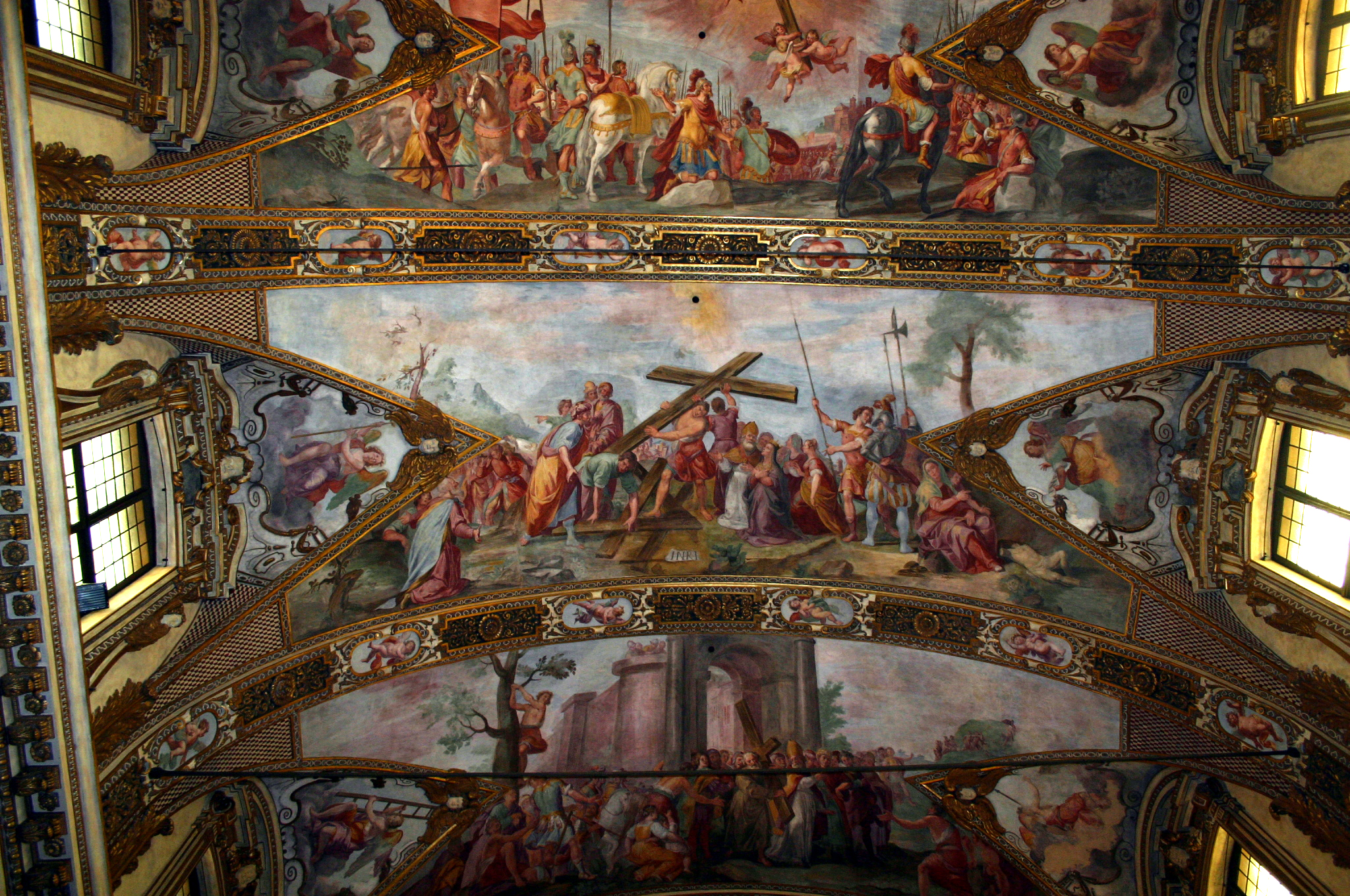
Carlone frescoes in Sant'Antonio Abate

The interior of the church, defined as a “museum of the figurative arts of seventeenth-century Lombardy,” features a nave completely frescoed by different artists according to the theme of some biblical episodes; the dome fresco represents the Glory of All Saints (1696) and was created by Filippo Abbiati and Federico Bianchi, as well as the apse and chancel, which are frescoed on the theme of Episodes from the life of St. Alexander. All four chapels are richly frescoed and decorated, including Camillo Procaccini's painting of the Assumption of Mary and the Navità altarpiece, and Fiammenghini's frescoes of Angels, Moncalvo's Adoration of the Magi, and finally Daniele Crespi's Beheading of the Baptist on canvas. Of note, on the subject of applied arts, are the confessionals and the pulpit made of inlaid wood or marble.

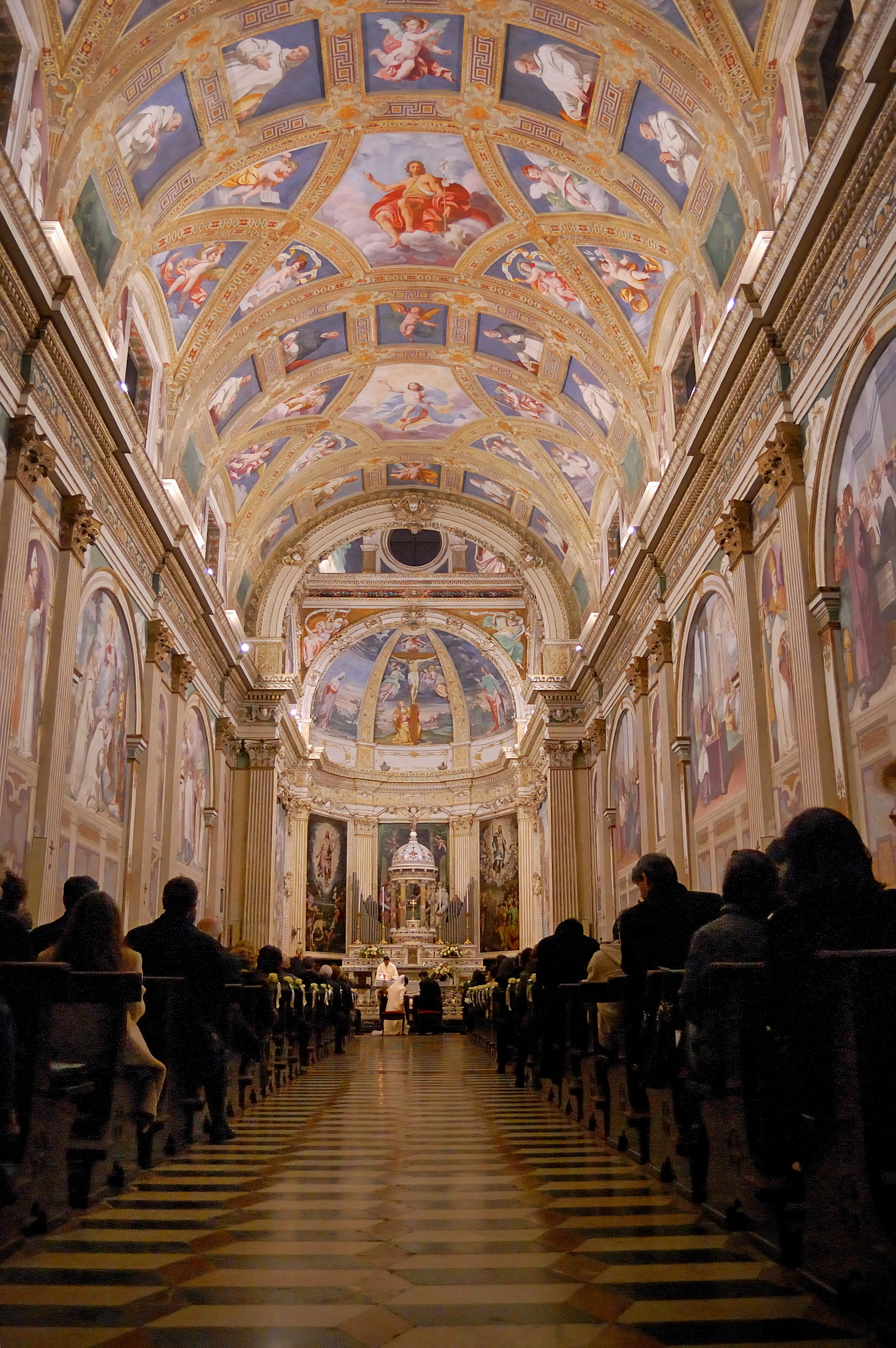
Nave of the Garegnano Charterhouse, frescoed by Crespi

Also in the historic center, although the church of Sant'Antonio Abate underwent a complete facade makeover in the Neoclassical period, the interior is still among the best decorative examples of Lombard Baroque. The construction of the church was determined in 1582 and entrusted to Dionigi Campazzo, the plan is in the shape of a Latin cross, and the nave and the counter-façade are frescoed with the cycle of Stories of the True Cross by Giovanni Carlone, later completed by his brother Giovanni Battista upon Giovanni's death from the plague. On the sides of the nave are the chapels: the chapel of St. Andrew Avellino houses the altarpiece of the Fainting of Blessed Andrew Avellino by Francesco Cairo and is frescoed by Ercole Procaccini the Younger and Filippo Abbiati; also on the right, the chapel of the Virgin of Suffrage made by Carlo Buzzi houses the sculptural group of the Dead Christ by Giuseppe Rusnati. On the transept, canvases by Morazzone, Annibale and Ludovico Carracci can be seen, while the vault is frescoed by Tanzio da Varallo. On the left side, the third chapel is adorned with three canvases by Giulio Cesare Procaccini, while the second, designed by Gerolamo Quadrio, contains another sculptural cycle by Rusnati, and the Ecstasy of Saint Gaetano on canvas by Cerano.

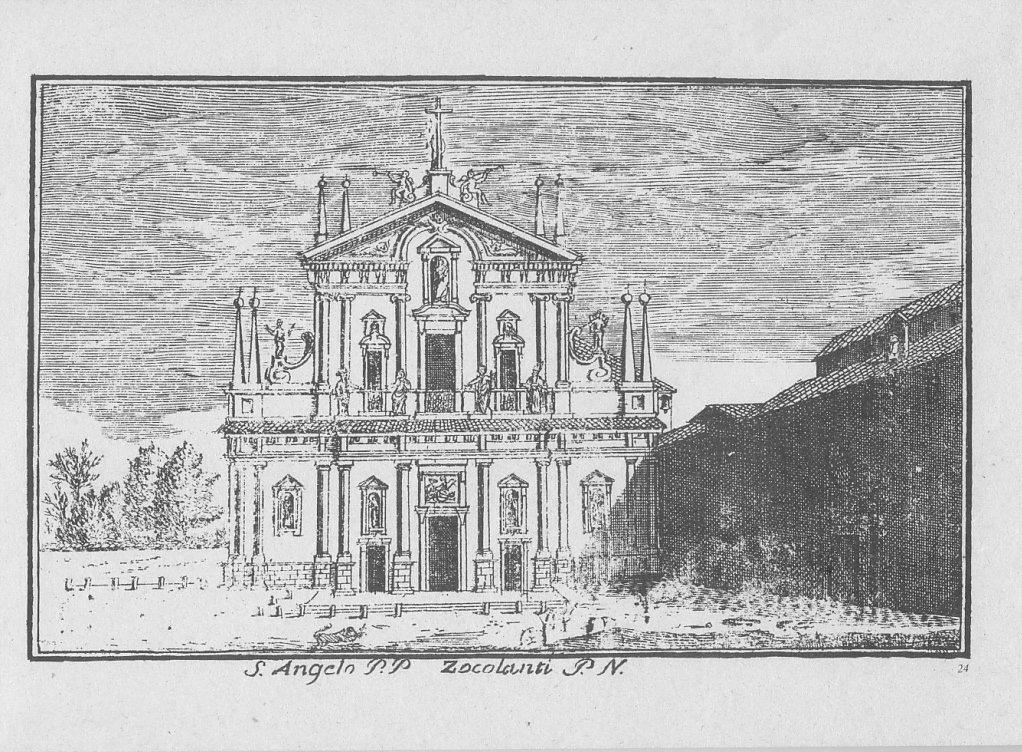
Marcantonio Dal Re – Views of Milan, Sant'Angelo, owned by the Franciscan friars (1697–1766)

On Via della Moscova is the church of Sant'Angelo, built in the late Mannerist period and completed in 1630. The facade is divided into two orders, the lower one marked by four columns crowned by as many statues, and the upper one decorated by three large windows and crowned by a tympanum; the most significant Baroque interventions, however, can be seen inside. In the side chapels are the paintings of the Ecstasy of St. Charles Borromeo by Morazzone, the Marriage of the Virgin by Camillo Procaccini, and the frescoes depicting Stories of Samson in the first left chapel completely decorated by Panfilo Nuvolone, father of Carlo Francesco. On the walls of the chancel and choir are painted the four Stories of the Virgin by Simone Barabino and Camillo Procaccini's Assumption; finally, the sacristy is of considerable interest, containing Giulio Cesare Procaccini's lunette of the Dead Christ Mourned by Angels, considered one of his best works.

Also from the early seventeenth century are the church of Santa Maria Podone designed by Fabio Mangone and the church of San Sisto. At the time outside the city walls, now in the suburbs, is the Garegnano Charterhouse: although part of the church was built in the Mannerist period, much of the interior, built in the early 17th century, represents one of the most successful examples of Milanese Baroque. The façade was completed in 1608; inside, the vault of the nave was frescoed by Daniele Crespi with the Sacrifice of Abraham, Magdalene in Ecstasy, inspired by Giovanni Lanfranco's frescoes of the Camerino degli Eremiti in Palazzo Farnese, St. John the Baptist, more in keeping with classicist models from Emilia, and Christ in Glory, depicted according to the canons of the Counter-Reformation, to which are added various figures of Carthusian monks; the counter façade is painted with the Stories of Saint Bruno also by Crespi: these depictions are considered among the artist's best works. Also in the church are the altarpieces of the Apparition of Christ to Saint Catherine of Siena by Camillo Procaccini, and Saint Bruno between Saint Hugh of Grenoble and Saint Charles Borromeo by Genovesino.

=== Painting ===
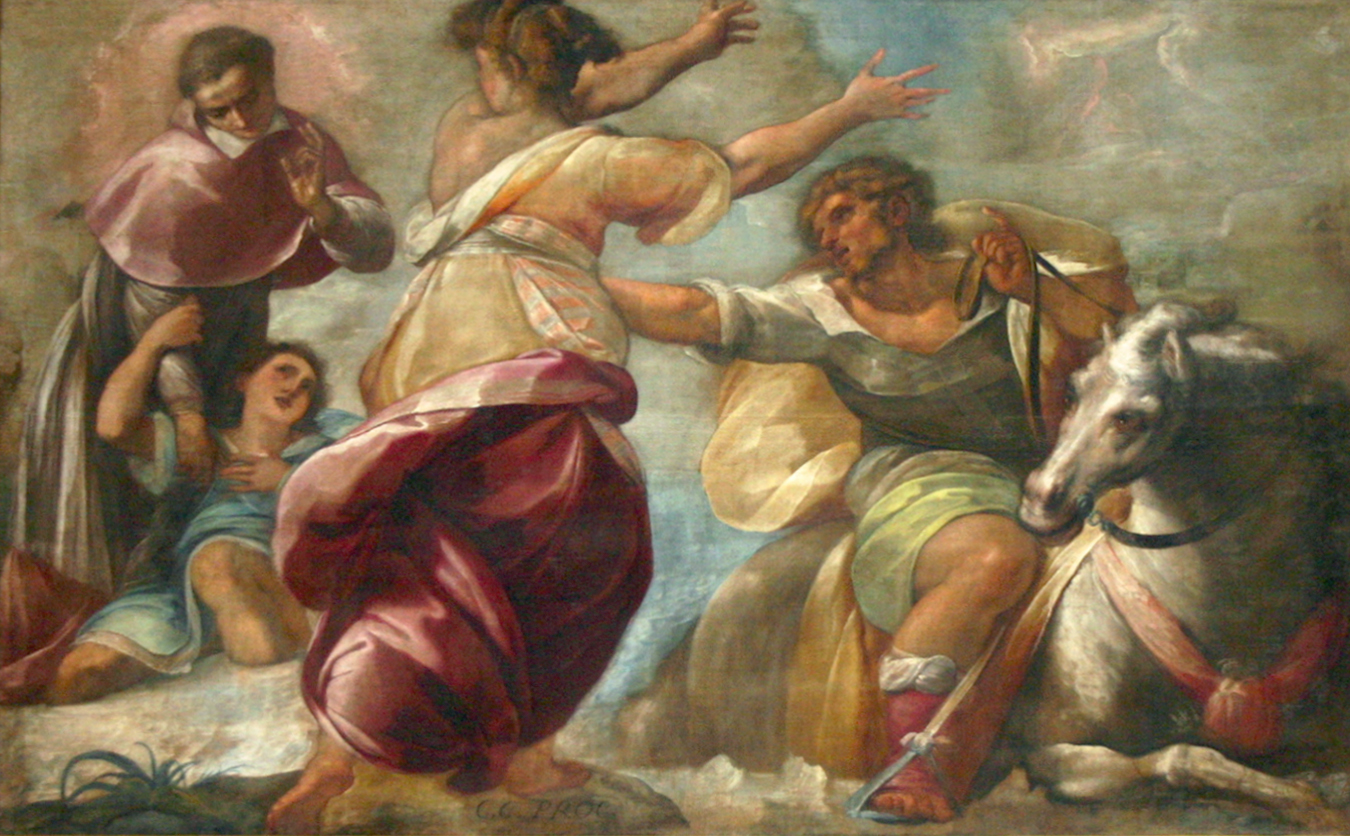
Giulio Cesare Procaccini – Miracle of the child Giovanni Tirone (1610), Milan Cathedral

The protagonists of early Milanese Baroque painting are, as already specified, Cerano, Giulio Cesare Procaccini and Morazzone. These three figures were the main authors of the Quadroni of Saint Charles, one of the most important cycles of paintings of the early Milanese Baroque.

The Quadroni of St. Charles consist of two pictorial cycles that recount episodes from the life of St. Charles Borromeo, among the main figures of the Council of Trent and the Counter-Reformation: these cycles were commissioned in close relation to the proposed canonization of Cardinal Borromeo: they were intended to show through an iconographic path the exemplarity of the life of Charles Borromeo. The first cycle, made between 1602 and 1604, included twenty canvases, to which some were added later, ranging from descriptions of the cardinal's public activities, such as the spread of Counter-Reformation doctrines and visits to the plague victims, to private life, such as episodes of charity and penance; the paintings feature the work of the aforementioned Cerano and Morazzone, who were joined by Paolo Camillo Landriani, known as the Duchino, Giovanni Battista della Rovere, known as the Fiammenghino, and other lesser artists such as Carlo Antonio Procaccini, cousin of the more famous Giulio Cesare, and Domenico Pellegrini. The second cycle of the Quadroni dates back to 1610, after the canonization had taken place, and has as its theme the miracles of the saint: it consists of twenty-four tempera paintings; Cerano, Giulio Cesare Procaccini and Duchino made six each, while the others were made by lesser masters, such as Giorgio Noyes and Carlo Buzzi: some additional canvases would be commissioned towards the end of the seventeenth century.

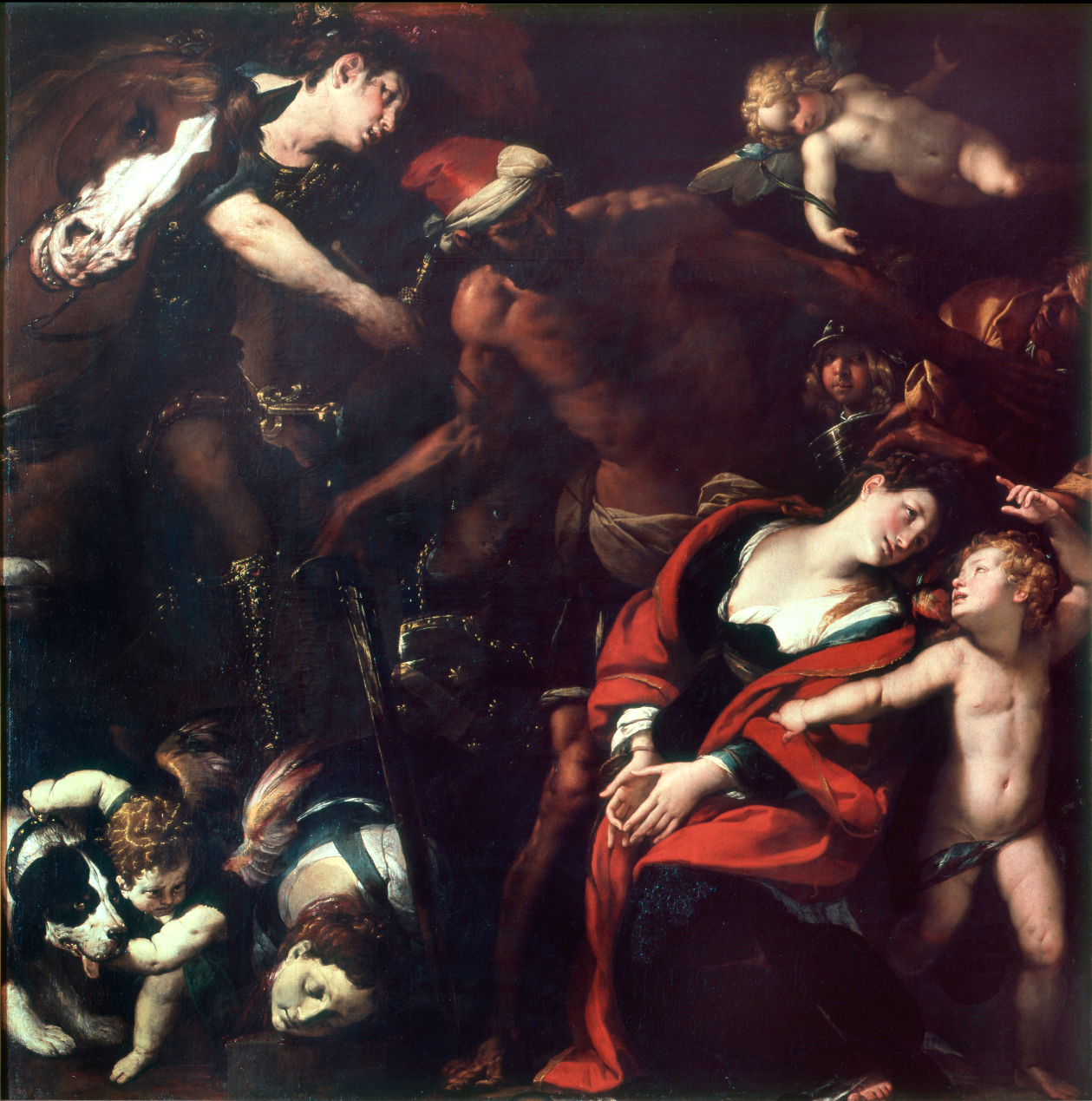
Il Cerano, Giulio Cesare Procaccini, Il Morazzone – The painting by three hands (1625), Pinacoteca di Brera

Although the Quadroni of St. Charles as a whole are one of the most representative pictorial cycles of early Milanese Baroque art, critics are often divided on the uniformity of the quality of the executions: while Cerano's works are praised by critics for the excellent result, Duchino and Fiammenghino fail to achieve the same consensus, and the works of Carlo Antonio Procaccini and Domenico Pellegrini are rarely considered to be of the same quality as those of the previous artists.

A masterpiece of seventeenth-century Lombard painting, on the other hand, is the painting Martyrdom of Saints Rufina and Secunda, better known as the Painting of the Three Hands, as it was produced in a collaboration between Cerano, Giulio Cesare Procaccini and Morazzone, i.e., the major painters of the time. The painting depicts the martyrdom of two young sisters in the age of imperial Rome and can be ideally divided into the three parts in which the painters worked: in the center the executioner holding a broadsword, his assistants and the angel with the palm of martyrdom is the work of Morazzone; Procaccini took care on the right of Saint Rufina and the angel bringing her comfort; Cerano is credited with the left part featuring the horseman, the already decapitated Saint Secunda and the angel holding a dog about to jump on the saint's head. Analyzing the careers and styles of the individual artists, the patron, Scipione Toso, entrusted each of the parts of the painting according to the themes and styles most suitable to the painters: while Cerano was particularly adept at giving a dramatic tone to the work, Procaccini was able to adequately represent Christian hope, while Morazzone distinguished himself by a more energetic and dynamic character of his representation.

Finally, the above-mentioned artists took part in the limited trend of portraiture: the most famous collection of the period is that of the benefactors of the Ospedale Maggiore, in which Daniele Crespi and Tanzio da Varallo stand out with their portraits of Pozzobonelli and Francesco Pagano.

=== Civil architecture ===
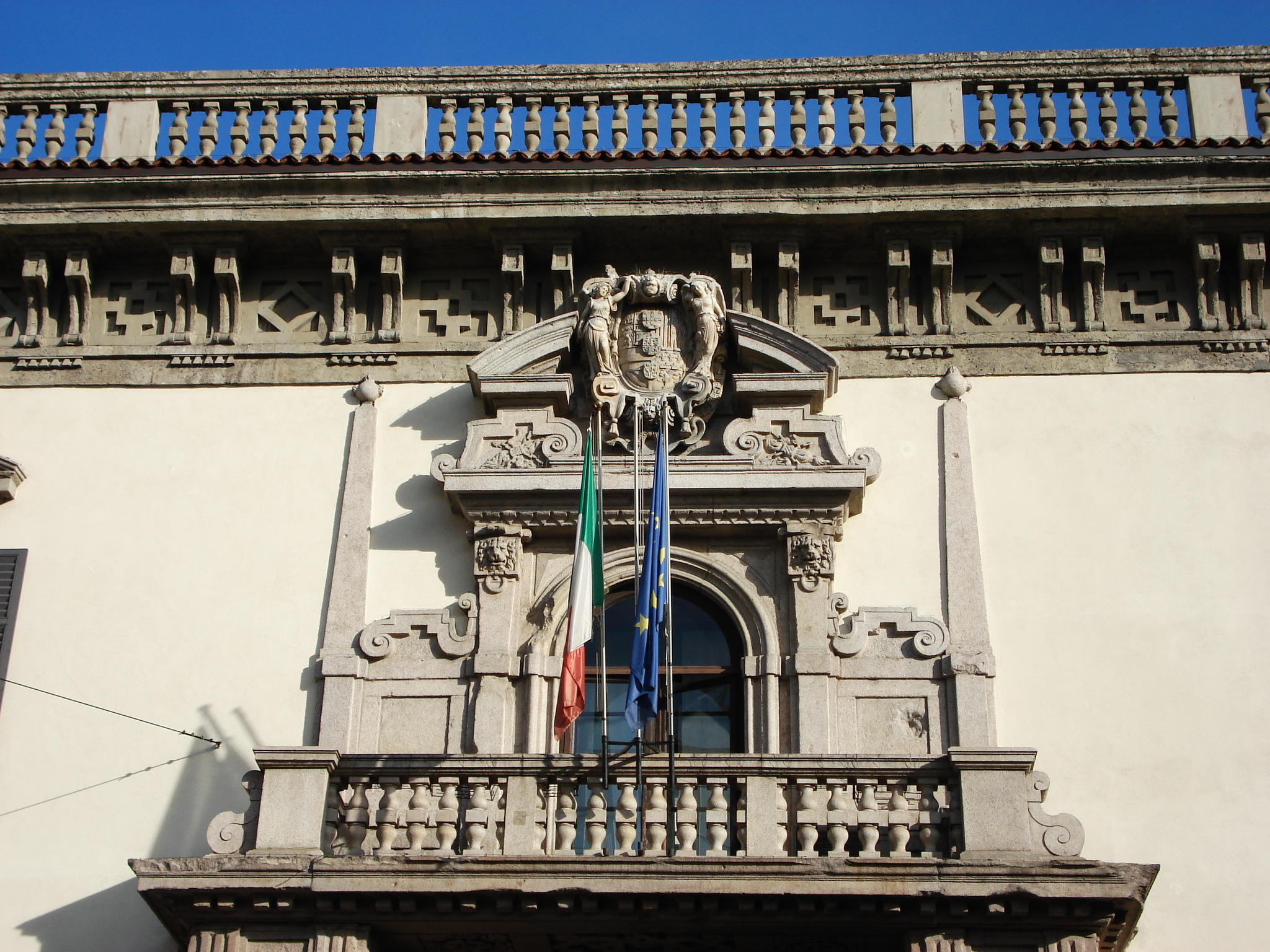
Detail of the Palace of the Captain of Justice

In the early seventeenth century, religious commissions far outnumbered civil ones: in significantly smaller numbers than religious buildings and sacred art, civil palaces were also built, often still linked to religious commissions.

The greatest example of civil architecture of the period is the Palazzo del Senato, commissioned in 1608 by Federico Borromeo to house the Collegio Elvetico: the project was originally assigned to Fabio Mangone, and resumed twenty years later by Richini. A particular feature of the palace is the central part of the concave facade, designed by Richini, which breaks away from the more sober Milanese style, approaching a more ornate Roman Baroque. Inside are two courtyards with classical forms by Mangone, defined by a double order of architraved loggias.

Started by order of Francesco Sforza, the construction site for Filarete's Ospedale Maggiore, which had been at a standstill for many years, reopened in 1624 thanks to a large bequest from a private individual: the renovation projects were once again entrusted to Richini and Fabio Mangone, who were responsible for the central part of the façade and the large Baroque portal with tympanum, flanked by niches with statues, and the reworking of the main courtyard with a double order of arched loggias with marble and terracotta decorations; artists such as Camillo Procaccini and Cerano also took part in the work and in the designs for the works.

Finally, mention should be made of the Palace of the Captain of Justice, which was begun in the 16th century and underwent a great deal of remodeling and enlargement over the years: of the 17th-century interventions, the facade, with its elaborate portal, and the ashlar loggia courtyard remain.

== The Second Half of the 17th Century ==
=== Religious architecture ===
Compared to the early seventeenth century, religious building sites no longer had the same liveliness as in Federico Borromeo's period, although they still represented the major commissions of the period; however, the decoration of interiors of existing churches rather than the construction of new buildings was more favored.

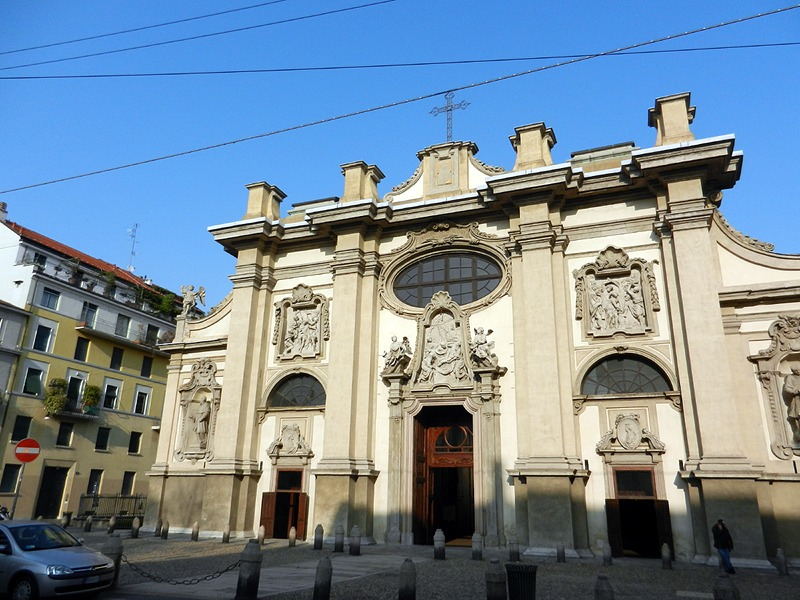
Facade of the church of Santa Maria della Passione

The building site of the church of Santa Maria della Passione was started in the 16th century, decreasing in intensity over the years, only to regain vibrancy in the 17th century, so the church results in a mixture of Baroque and Lombard Renaissance art. The façade of the church, which dates back to 1692 and was designed by Giuseppe Rusnati, is marked by four pilasters: on the extreme sides are two typically Baroque niches, while the other three spaces marked by the pilasters are decorated with high reliefs depicting the Flagellation, the Coronation of Thorns and the Deposition; of particular note is the similarity with the church of Sant'Alessandro in Zebedia of the putti placed on the sides of the façade. The decorations inside date largely from the early seventeenth century. In the nave at the base of the dome is the cycle of the Stories of the Passion by Daniele Crespi; in the right aisle, the third chapel houses Giulio Cesare Procaccini's canvas depicting Christ at the Pillar, while the fifth chapel has the canvases of Esther and Ahasuerus and Our Lady of the Rosary between St. Dominic and St. Catherine of Siena by Giuseppe Nuvolone. The left aisle houses Camillo Procaccini's canvases, dated 1610, of St. Francis Receiving the Stigmata and Christ in the Garden of Olives, as well as the Funeral of Thomas Becket, the work of Giuseppe Vermiglio, also on canvas (1625); the fourth chapel features the Madonna and Saints by Duchino, and the Flagellation and Christ in the Garden of Olives by Enea Salmeggia known as Talpino; finally, in the first chapel is the famous painting of the Fasting of Saint Charles by Daniele Crespi, which, carefully respecting the artistic dictates indicated by Charles Borromeo, is intended to represent in its essentiality the moral and religious loftiness of the saint.

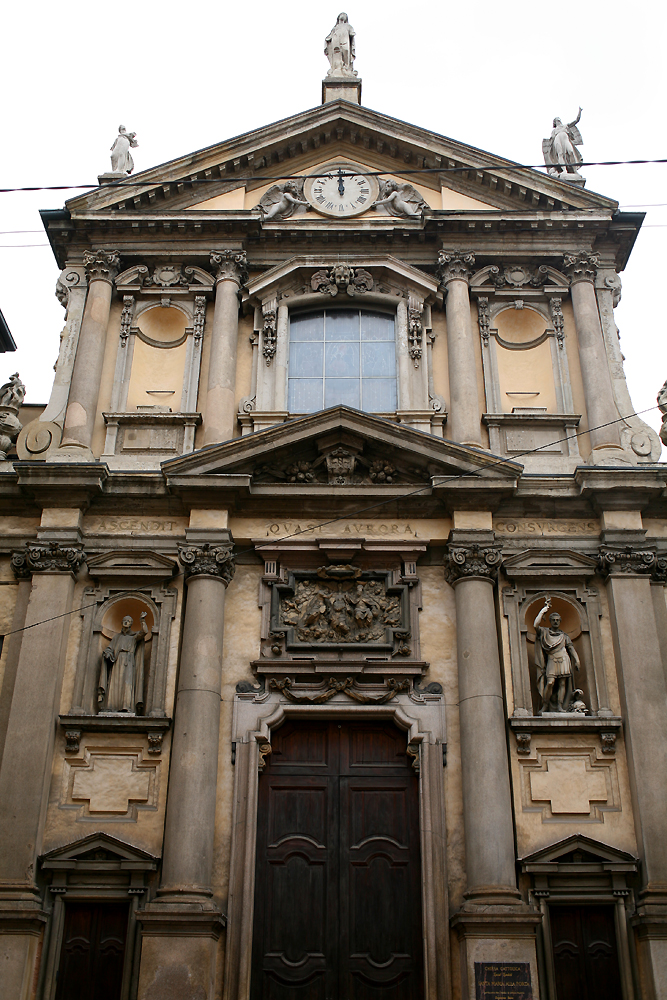
Facade of the church of Santa Maria alla Porta

The other major accomplishment of the period was the church of Santa Maria alla Porta, completely rebuilt on the old church dating back to the 12th century: the project was initially drawn up by Francesco Maria Richini starting in 1652, and then passed on upon the architect's death in 1658 to Francesco Borromini, who finished the project, in particular responsible for the main portal. The rather slender façade is divided into two orders, Ionic and Corinthian respectively, joined by volutes and ending with a tympanum on which are statues of the Virgin and two Angels; on the façade at the sides are niches, while the central part is more decorated, with the architraved major portal surmounted by a relief by Carlo Simonetta of the Coronation of the Virgin from 1670; the upper order is then decorated with a large late Baroque window. The interior consists of a single nave with side chapels introduced by Serlian windows, ending with the presbytery which contains a dome with lantern attributed to Gerolamo Quadrio; on the drum are niches with sculptures of angels by Giuseppe Vismara and Carlo Simonetta dating from 1662. Notable among the four chapels is the first on the right side, designed by Giuseppe Quadrio, with the works Gloria and Angels also by Simonetta: it constitutes one of the best examples of sculpture of the second Lombard 17th century.

Also from the period is the church of San Nicolao, rebuilt starting in 1660 following the demolition of a pre-existing church by Gerolamo Quadrio and Giovan Battista Paggi. The church is rather sober both inside and out, yet it contains one of the few examples of Neapolitan painting in the city, namely a canvas of St. Nicholas by Massimo Stanzione, donated at the time of the church's consecration by the King of Spain's advisor Matteo Rosales. The exterior of the church of Santa Maria della Vittoria has been completely remodeled, especially the twentieth-century facade; the interior, however, is notable for the canvas of St. Peter freed from prison by Giovanni Ghisolfi and the marble Angels by Antonio Raggi both located near the right altar, while on the left altar are the canvas of St. Charles communicating with the plague victims by Giacinto Brandi and two other marble Angels by Dionigi Bussola.

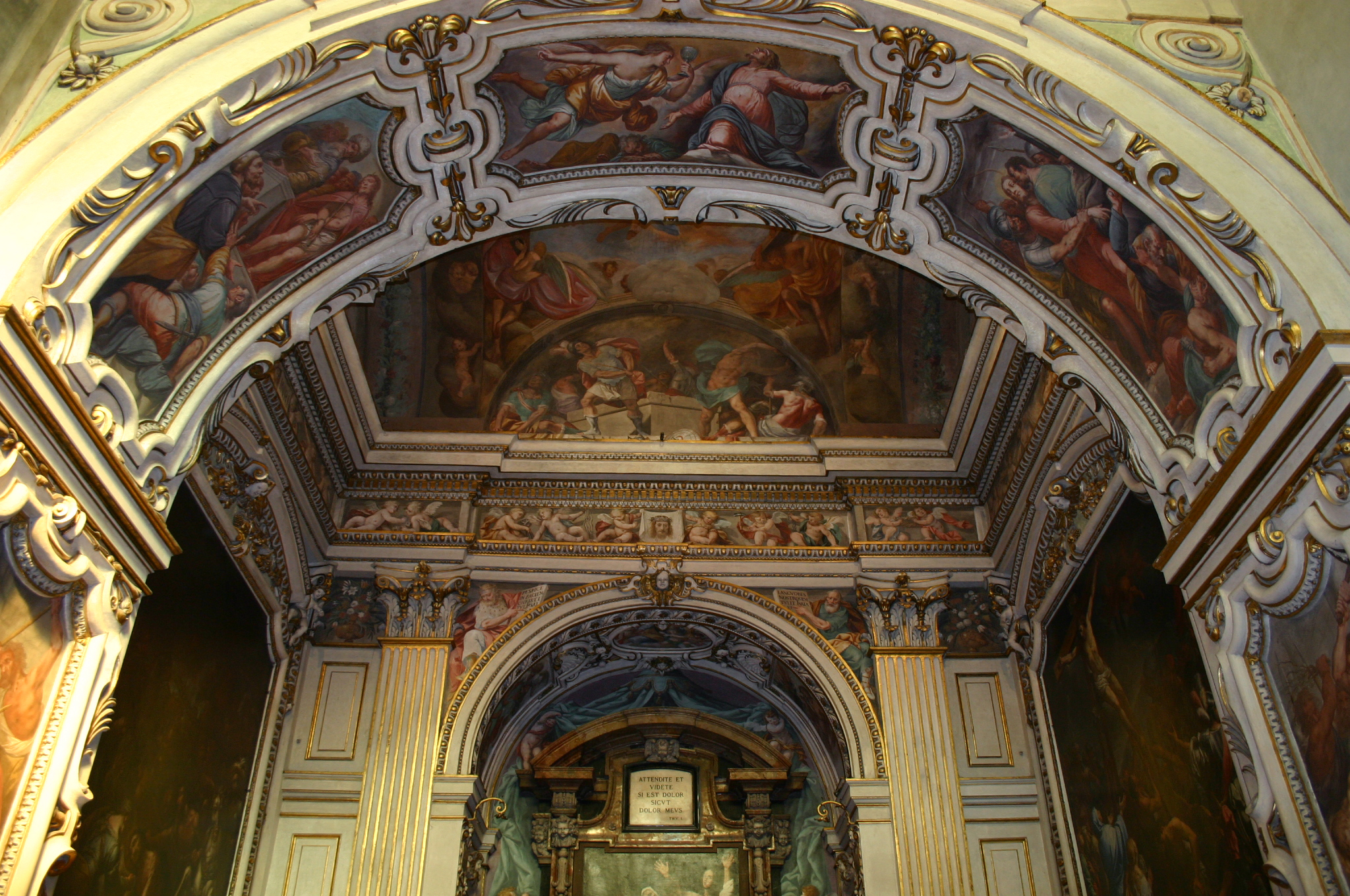
Chapel of Piety of the Church of St. Mark

Of particular note is the remodeling of the interior of St. Mark's Church, modified from 1690, in which the current pillars were built, the previous barrel vault of the nave was replaced by a truss roof, and the dome was built: the plan is in the shape of a Latin cross and is divided into three naves, at the sides of which are the numerous chapels dating from various periods. In the right transept is the fresco Alexander V institutes the order of the Augustinians of the Fiammenghini, while in the chapel of St. Augustine are canvases by Federico Bianchi and Paolo Pagani; in the side walls of the chancel are canvases of stories of St. Augustine by Cerano and Camillo Procaccini, as well as frescoes by Genovesino and the altarpiece of St. Augustine by Ercole Procaccini the Elder. In the left transept are the works of later authors: in the Chapel of the Pietà, on either side of which are canvases by Antonio Busca and Ercole Procaccini the Younger, who is also responsible for the History of the Passion frescoes on the entrance arch; inside are stuccos and frescoes by Montalto, while on the wall opposite the chapel are frescoes of the Adoration of the Sacred Band and St. Augustine Washing the Feet of Christ in Pilgrim's Clothing by Legnanino. In the left aisle is a Christ Appears to St. Jerome Translating the Holy Scriptures by Legnanino, Madonna and Saints Peter and Anthony by Camillo Procaccini and a Transfiguration by Giulio Cesare Procaccini.

Finally, of note are some restorations by Gerolamo Quadrio in the church of Santa Maria del Carmine between 1673 and 1676 and Carlo Garavaglia's walnut choir from 1645 depicting Episodes from the life of St. Bernard at the Abbey of Chiaravalle.

=== Civil architecture ===
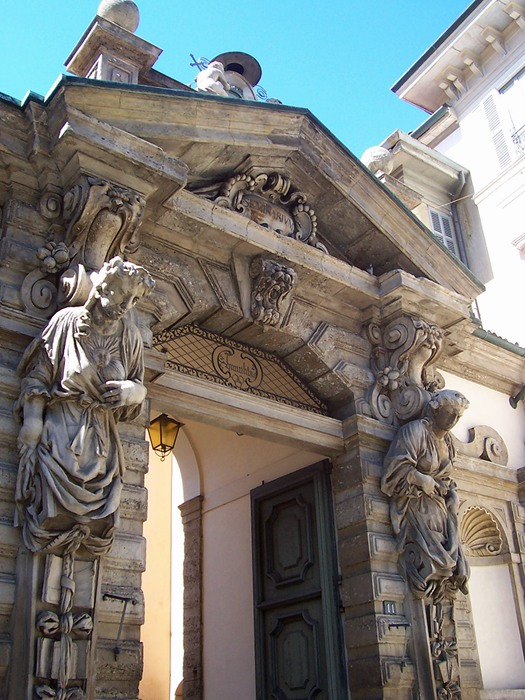
Portal of the Archiepiscopal Seminary

Although the second half of the seventeenth century in Milan saw an increasing interest in civil architecture compared to the first half of the century, the dominance of religious art did not diminish, especially considering that many palaces had a religious commission.

Religious commissions include the Archiepiscopal Seminary, in particular the entrance, a perfect example of a Baroque portal, which was designed by Richini in 1652: consisting of smooth ashlar and crowned by a trapezoidal architrave, it has two caryatids representing Hope and Charity on its sides. For the use of the Barnabites' schools, on the other hand, the Collegio di Sant'Alessandro was built, based on a design by Lorenzo Binago and built between 1663 and 1684; the façade of late Baroque setting, sometimes attributed to Borromini, is divided into two orders: on the ground floor the portal with curvilinear architrave decorated on the sides with two curled cartouches is of immediate impact, while on the upper floor the windows have medallions depicting allegories related to culture in the mixtilinear gables. Minor changes were made in the Archbishop's Palace by Andrea Biffi, who finished his modifications in the inner courtyard in 1680.

A few minutes' walk from the Archbishop's Palace stands Palazzo Durini: commissioned in 1645 by merchant-banker Giovan Battista Durini, the project was assigned to Richini; the palace is one of the greatest examples of seventeenth-century building in the city. The facade, as was an established tradition in the city, is rather sober and linear when compared to the Baroque styles of other cities in Italy and is centered on a monumental ashlar entrance portal that supports an equally monumental balcony on the piano nobile, where large windows decorated with alternating triangular and curvilinear tympanums are decorated with supports at the base in the form of a mascaron, a pattern that is echoed in the cornice. The interiors are also worthy of note: from the grand red marble staircase that leads to the main floor, one enters the antechamber decorated with trompe l'oeil and, after passing through a series of rooms decorated with painted medallions, one reaches the Hall of Honour, frescoed with the Triumph of Eros by the Lombard school; also on the main floor, one can admire the carved wooden ceilings from the demolished Arnaboldi Palace.

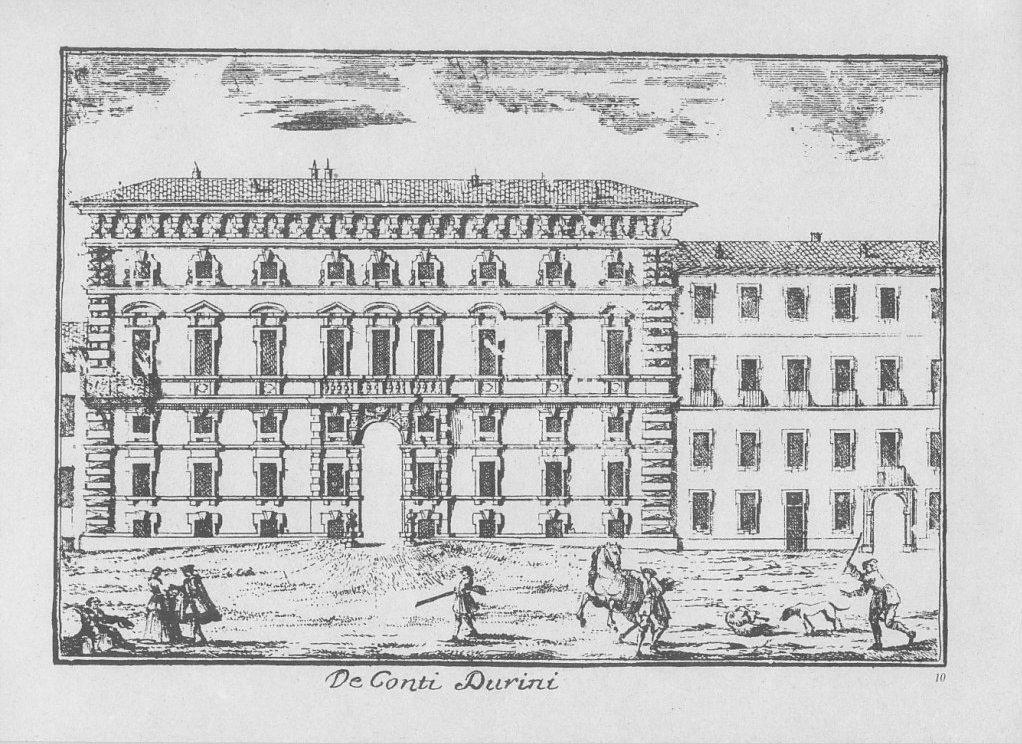
Marcantonio Dal Re – Views of Milan, Durini Palace (1745)

Completed in the fourth decade of the seventeenth century, Palazzo Annoni was once again built to a design by Filippo Maria Richini; the façade, adorned on the ground floor with an ashlar plinth, is centered on the entrance door inserted between two jutting columns of Ionic order that support the balcony on the piano nobile; on the upper floor, large windows with alternating triangular or curvilinear pediments feature balustrades; finally, the façade is bordered by ashlar lesenes. The inner courtyard, built by repeating the exterior decoration, is reached through the original wrought-iron gate. The palace in the 18th century was home to a rich library and the Annoni's private art gallery, which included, among other things, paintings by Rubens, Gaudenzio Ferrari and Antoon van Dyck, confiscated by the Austrians in 1848.

Opposite Palazzo Annoni is Palazzo Acerbi, dating from the early seventeenth century, yet heavily renovated during the years of the great plague: the facade, rather meager when compared to the one in front, was embellished in the eighteenth century with curvilinear small balconies and ornamental masks with lion figures near the entrance portal, while inside, past the first sober architraved courtyard, the second courtyard in rococo style is of particular note. Precisely because of the opposite position of the two palaces, towards the second half of the seventeenth century there was a battle of “sumptuousness” between the Annoni and Acerbi families: the former was impressed by the richness of the Acerbi's renovations and did not want to be outdone; thus began a long duel of renovations and works of the palaces aimed at defining which of the two families was richer and more powerful.

The palace of the Scuole Palatine was intended for public use, which was built on the area of a palace that had gone up in flames: work began in 1644 on a design by Carlo Buzzi, who for the façade took up the structure of the Palazzo dei Giureconsulti. Of the original construction only the façade remains, set on several orders: on the ground floor there is a loggia divided by paired columns, while on the upper floor there are decorated windows with a niche in the center containing a statue of St. Augustine by Giovan Pietro Lasagna, while further to the right, on the pediment leading to a covered passage, there is a statue of Ausonius, also by the same author.

=== Painting ===
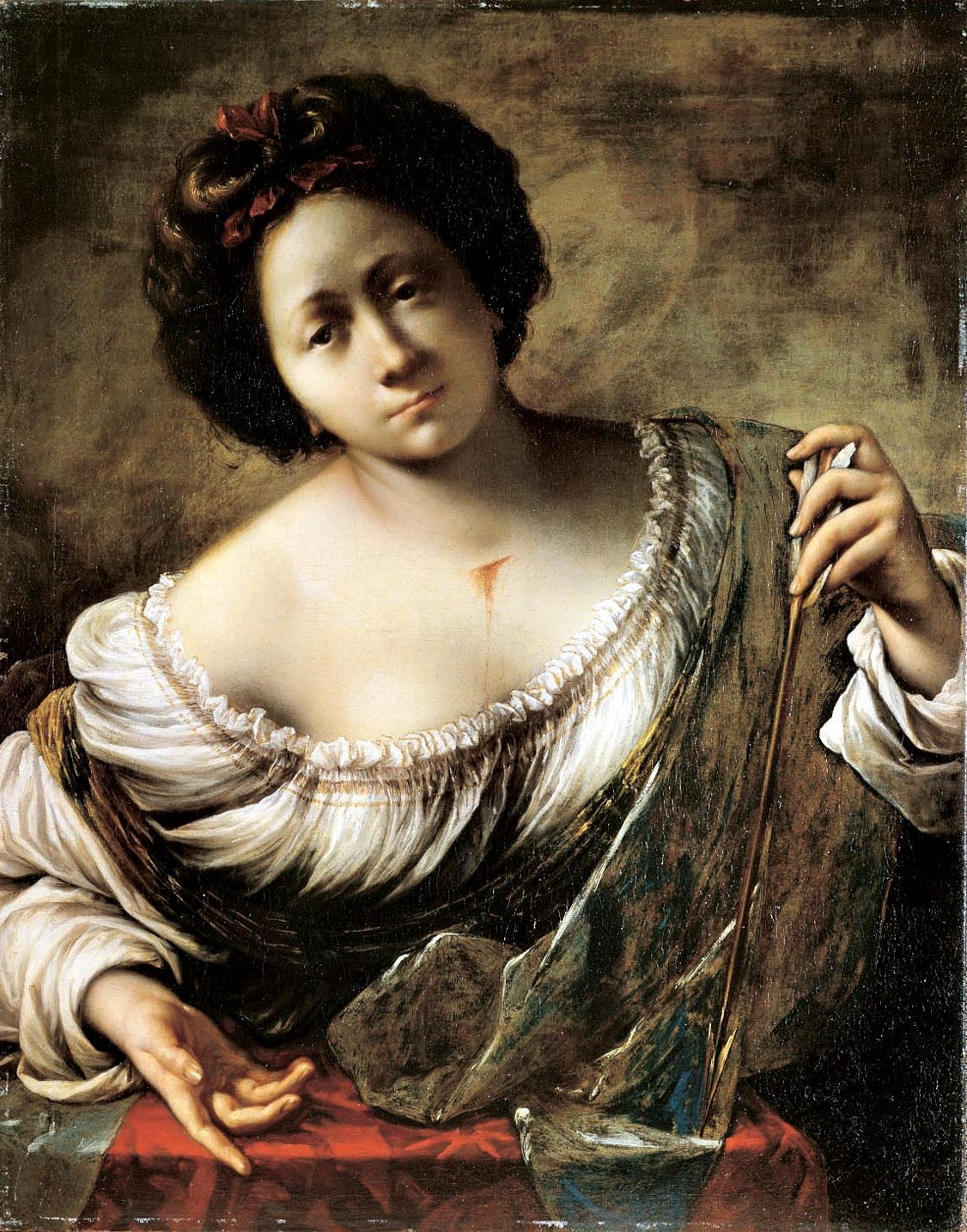
Francesco Cairo – Saint Cristina (1683) – Pinacoteca del Castello Sforzesco

After the death of the most important exponents of the early 17th-century Lombard "plague" painters, the second half of the 17th century saw the consolidation of their legacy and the definitive break with the Mannerist links found in some of the works of the Federician artists: most of the artists of this period were in fact pupils of the Academy Ambrosiana or had trained in the workshops of the early 17th-century Lombard masters.

It was Carlo Francesco Nuvolone, the elder of the two brothers and a pupil of Cerano, who marked the breaking point, showing in his style the dynamism typical of Baroque art, whose frescoes in the church of Sant'Angelo in Milan are remembered; while Francesco Cairo showed a constant evolution of style, which was affected by his numerous trips between Turin and Rome where he also had the opportunity to compare himself with exponents of the Emilian and Genoese schools. These two painters, together with Giuseppe Nuvolone were in a constant exchange, arising from numerous collaborations at various sites, above all those of the Lombard Sacred Mountains, which would lead to an evolution of early seventeenth-century sacred painting, abandoning its exclusively dramatic language in favor of a greater narrative variety. The evolution of Milanese painting was completed by Giovan Battista Discepoli, a pupil of Camillo Procaccini, whose painting was more influenced by Morazzone: he also showed a strong stylistic evolution; among his works are the canvases in the church of San Vittore al Corpo and the Adoration of the Magi, once in the demolished church of San Marcellino.

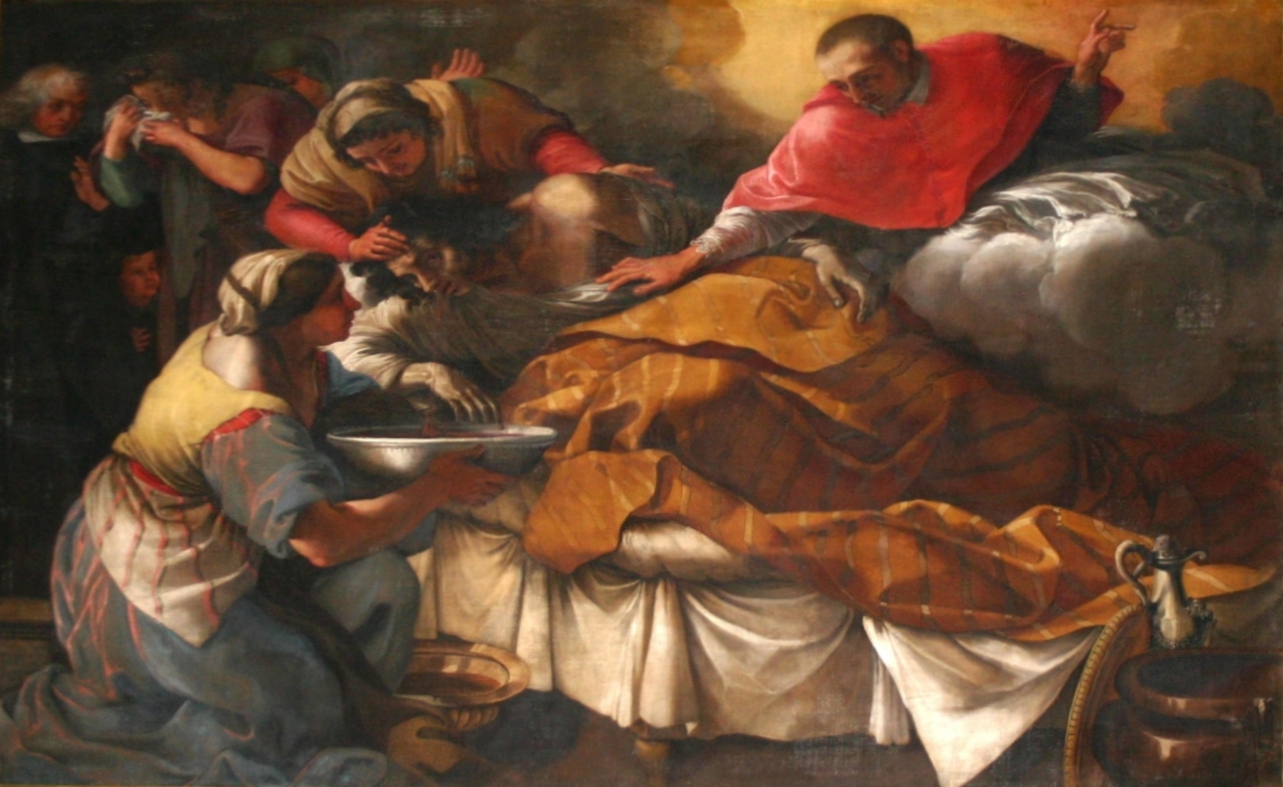
Giorgio Bonola – Miracle of Marco Spagnolo (1681) – Milan Cathedral

With the death of Carlo Francesco Nuvolone or Cairo, and through the influence of the newly elected Pope Clement IX and his relations with Archbishop Alfonso Litta, Lombard art saw a rapprochement with Roman art toward a more markedly Baroque style; this helped to bring Roman artists such as Salvator Rosa and Pier Francesco Mola to Milan, while the travels of young artists to Rome, including those of Giovanni Ghisolfi and Antonio Busca, were again favored, which led to a new modernisation of the Milanese artistic milieu; it is no coincidence that Antonio Busca was later appointed to the chair of the Accademia Ambrosiana. With the latter, two currents were established that would persist into the eighteenth century as well, namely, a more classicist current characteristic of Busca, contrasted with a more exuberant and imaginative style of Giuseppe Nuvolone's maturation, transporting to the Ambrosian city that same controversy between the two styles of the Roman milieu.

Many years after the plague painters, there was a small revival of the Borromeo pictorial tradition; in particular, the works of Giorgio Bonola and Andrea Lanzani, who favored a more classicist orientation, and Filippo Abbiati, whose style was avowedly baroque, were added to the already vast work of the Quadroni of St. Charles, and later the works of Giacomo Parravicini: Abbiati and Lanzani would continue this duality between classicism and baroque in the early eighteenth century. Many of these artists were already in contact for the commission of the cycle of the life of St. Roch for the church of San Rocco in Miasino, where Bonola, Abbiati, Lanzani and Giuseppe Nuvolone worked. In the very last years of the seventeenth century the early work of Stefano Legnani, known as the Legnanino, and Sebastiano Ricci is notable: the work of these, however, is made to coincide and put in continuity with the Lombard eighteenth century.

As in the first half of the century, the art gallery of the benefactors of the Ospedale Maggiore collects the best examples of Milanese portraiture in the second half of the 17th century; through these paintings one can observe the evolution towards a more mature Baroque style: the best examples are attributed to Giuseppe Nuvolone.

== The 18th century ==
The eighteenth century marks a turning point in Milanese art and architecture: historically, it marks the duchy's transition to Austrian rule, under which the arts shifted from the service of religious patronage to the aristocracy and then to the state. There was thus a decrease in religious artistic production in favor of civil production. This period, while containing the most mature and exuberant forms of the Milanese Baroque, represents a kind of precursor to the Milanese neoclassical period, in which art and architecture definitively passed to the service of public affairs and the state.

=== Palazzo Litta ===
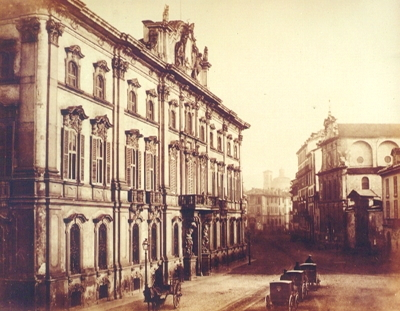
Historical photo of the front of Palazzo Litta

Palazzo Litta represents, along with Palazzo Clerici, the best example of 18th-century Baroque architecture in the city. Built in the seventeenth century, the project was once again entrusted to Richini, but it was not completed until 1752, when Bartolomeo Bolli was responsible for the design of its imposing façade. The palace consists of three bodies: the main body in the center is set on three floors, marked by six pilasters of Corinthian order, is more decorated and slightly more protruding than the other two symmetrical side bodies, which are only two floors high. On the ground floor, the central portal takes monumental forms, bordered by two giant caryatids supporting a convex balcony: this form is repeated on the side balconies of the second floor. Each floor has highly decorated windows with curvilinear tympanums, with different decorations: on the main floor, frames decorated with double volutes containing lion heads can be seen; the windows on the top floor have wrought-iron parapets. The central body is crowned by a large mixtilinear attic, with the coat of arms of the Litta family sculpted on the inside, supported by two Moors: the construction of this attic is sometimes attributed to the then unemployed Fabbrica del Duomo workers Elia Vincenzo Buzzi, Carlo Domenico Pozzo and Giuseppe Perego.

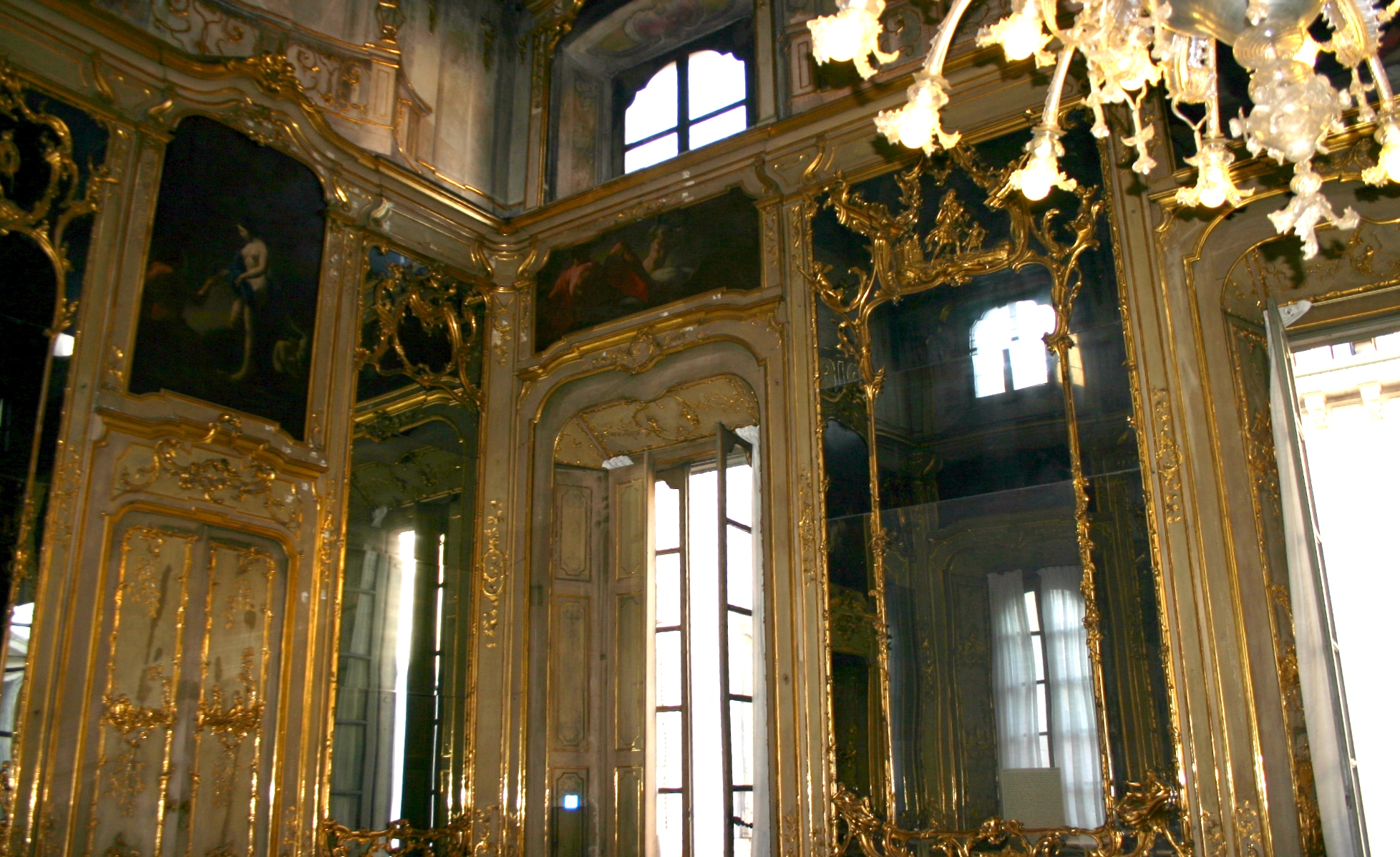
Hall of Mirrors, Palazzo Litta

Going through the entrance, one arrives in the main courtyard of seventeenth-century style, attributed to Richini; it has a square plan enclosed on all four sides by barrel-vaulted porticoes, supported by architraved granite columns decorated with capitals with festoons; continuing to the left, one enters the monumental double staircase, built by Carlo Giuseppe Merlo in 1750 in pink granite from Baveno with a parapet in red marble from Arzo and black marble from Varenna. The interiors are among the most luxurious in the Milanese scene, with inlaid floors, stucco and marble decorations as well as frescoes. Among the most remarkable rooms are the central salon, or Hall of Mirrors, adorned with gilded mirrors in the Rococo style and frescoed with Giovanni Antonio Cucchi's Apotheosis of a Litta; the Red Salon, furnished with purple-red damasks, frescoed in trompe l'oeil and with mosaic floors; the Yellow Salon, which takes its name from the colors of the fabrics with which the room is furnished; and the Duchess's Room still furnished by the original Baroque-era furniture; finally, there are the Marriage of Pluto and Proserpine made by Martin Knoller in a minor salon.

Finally, the clock courtyard, named after the characteristic clock found there, and the old private chapel of the Litta family on the ground floor of the palace, later transformed into the theater still in use, are noteworthy.

=== Palazzo Clerici ===
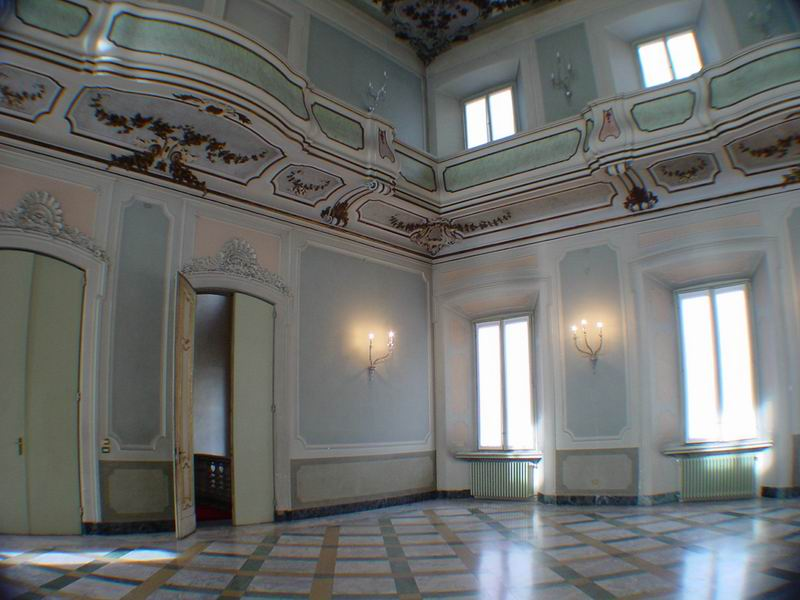
Ballroom of Palazzo Clerici

Palazzo Clerici was one of the most prestigious and opulent residences in 18th-century Milan, so much so that in 1772 it became the official temporary residence of Archduke Ferdinand, son of Maria Theresa of Austria. Designed by an unknown architect, the facade is set on three floors, with the central part recessed from the rest of the body; the central portal is rather sober and is decorated, in addition to the arch, by a mask with volutes, the windows are decorated with curvilinear gables; going through a wrought-iron gate one enters the courtyard with porticoes of paired Ionic columns in pink granite.

Critics, however, often point out the discrepancy of the unremarkable exterior, which reveals nothing of the luxurious interior. To the right of the courtyard is the three-flight grand staircase, on the balustrade of which there is a parade of statues placed on the fittings of the flights, while the vault is decorated with a fresco by Mattia Bortoloni. The interior reaches its zenith in the Gallery of Tapestries, whose vault is frescoed by Giambattista Tiepolo with the cycle of frescoes of the Race of the Sun Chariot, the Allegories of the Four Continents, and the Allegories of the Arts, considered to be among the Venetian painter's greatest works; the walls are decorated with Flemish tapestries dating from the 17th century depicting Stories of Moses and mirrors carved in wood by Giuseppe Cavanna, depicting scenes from Jerusalem Delivered.

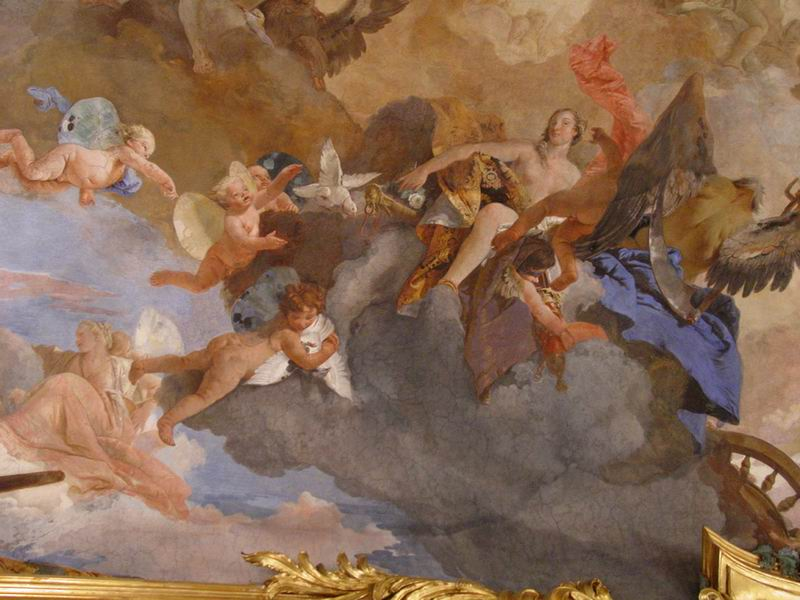
Detail of the frescoes in the Tapestry Gallery of Palazzo Clerici

The gallery, which was not large enough for the painter, was probably carved out of a pre-existing structure: this commission probably served to complete the social ascent that the family had been making since the seventeenth century: in the Sun Chariot Race, according to the art historian Michael Levey, it celebrates "the rising of the Austrian sun to illuminate the world", or the family's patronage, given the role of Apollo and Mercury as protectors of the sciences. In the Marshal's Room are stucco decorations by Giuseppe Cavanna with the Labors of Hercules and Mythological Stories; also in the room of the so-called Boudoir of Maria Theresa are decorations made by the carver.

Dating to a period between the 1830s and 1840s are frescoes in other rooms of the palace by Giovanni Angelo Borroni, with an Olympic Scene with the Rape of Ganymede and the Apotheosis of Hercules, and Mattia Bortoloni, to whom are attributed the medallion on the vault of the grand staircase, the Allegory of the Winds frescoes and another Apotheosis scene in the patron's private apartments, in which in a parade of Olympian gods is glimpsed a Jupiter with the features of Antonio Giorgio Clerici; also by Bortoloni is the fresco in the Picture Gallery, which celebrates the good Austrian government and Maria Theresa of Austria.

=== Other civil architecture ===
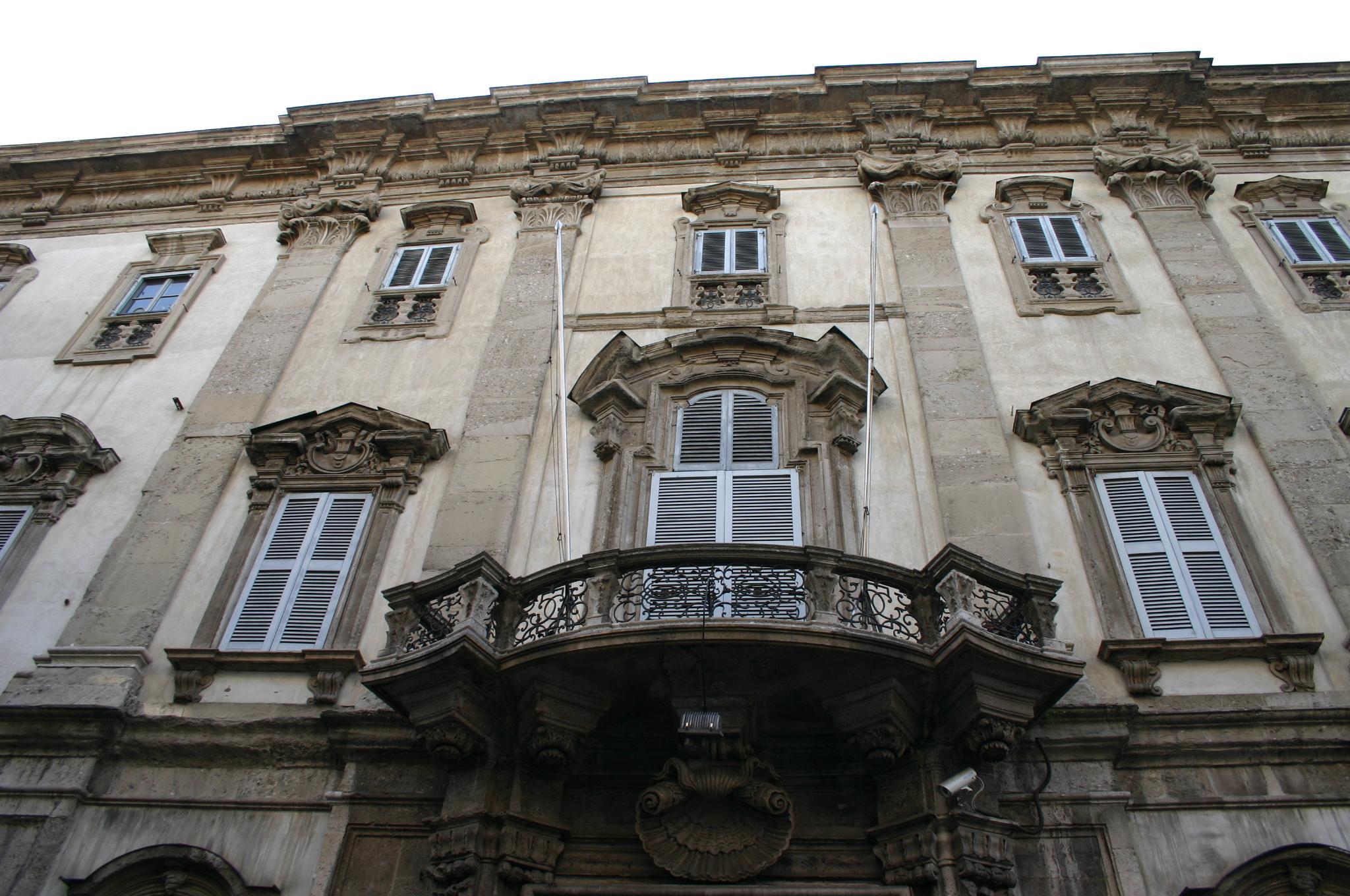
Detail of the facade of Palazzo Cusani

In addition to Palazzo Clerici, Tiepolo worked on many other Milanese construction sites of the time. Another significant work by the artist was at Palazzo Dugnani; the palace has two facades: the outer one is presented as more simple and undecorated, while the inner facade, overlooking the gardens of Porta Venezia, is decidedly more varied and articulated. The palace, divided into three parts, presents the central body set back from the two side parts, on the ground floor of which there is a portico and the upper floor consists of a loggia, crowned by a stone cymatium; this structure is then repeated in the two side bodies. In the hall of honor, cycles of frescoes of the Life of Scipio can be seen on the walls, while the vault depicts the Apotheosis of Scipio, in which the self-celebratory intent of Giuseppe Casati, then owner of the palace and patron, can be seen.

It differs from the style of typical Milanese mansions such as Palazzo Cusani: the reason can be found in the design of Giovanni Ruggeri, an architect from Rome who imported the more lively Roman Baroque into his work, already recognizable in the plinth made of rough faux rock on the ground floor. The palace is set on three floors, punctuated by Corinthian lesenes, and features two identical entrance portals; the windows on the ground and main floors are richly decorated with curvilinear, triangular and mixed pediments and tympanums, and are often further decorated with shells and plant elements; the French doors bear the Cusani family crest. On the top floor the windows are scaled down and have mixtilinear pediments; the whole ends on a rich balustrade.

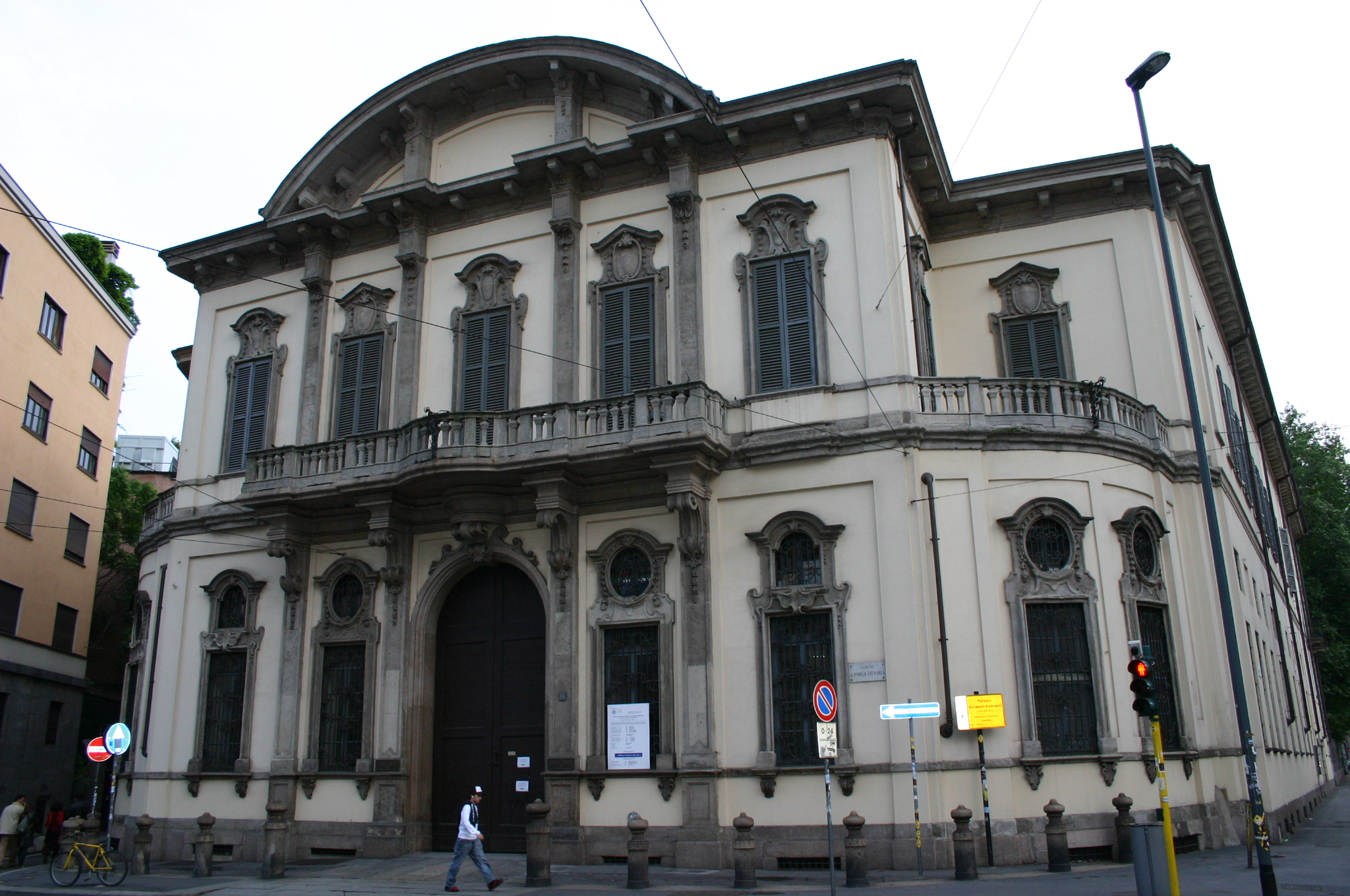
Facade of Palazzo Sormani

Dating from the seventeenth century but heavily remodeled in the first half of the eighteenth century is Palazzo Sormani, home of Milan's central municipal library. The palace has two different decorated facades; the front towards Corso di Porta Vittoria is the work of Francesco Croce: the facade has an arched portal in the center surmounted by a mixtilinear balcony, the windows on the ground floor are crowned by oval-framed windows and on the piano nobile by gables with alternating triangular and curvilinear motifs. The piano nobile also houses two side terraces, and is surmounted by a curvilinear tympanum; the facade toward the garden is of a later date and has a more sober appearance, a precursor to neoclassicism. The interior still contains the monumental stone staircase and houses the series of paintings representing Orpheus enchanting animals from the Verri family collection, traditionally attributed to Giovanni Benedetto Castiglione, known as Il Grechetto.

Palazzo Visconti di Modrone was commissioned in 1715 by Spanish Count Giuseppe Bolagnos. The facade has three floors and is marked vertically by four lesenes, and is centered on the rectangular portal limited by two granite columns supporting a stone balcony. As typical in other architecture of the period, the various floors have different window decorations for each floor, and of particular note are those on the piano nobile crowned with double volutes, while on the top floor some windows have small balconies. The inner courtyard, in addition to the classic rectangular courtyard solution with porticoes with coupled columns, has a balcony running along the entire second floor: an extremely rare arrangement in Lombard construction of the time. The ballroom with trompe l'eoil frescoes depicting mythological scenes by Nicola Bertuzzi is still preserved.

Other Baroque palaces of the period, although less conspicuous on the outside than those previously mentioned, are Palazzo Trivulzio, which is notable for the area near the entrance portal in contrast to the sobriety of the rest of the palace and Palazzo Olivazzi, whose entrance portal consists of a kind of giant niche, built to facilitate the entrance of carriages, and for the trompe l'oeil in the courtyard.

=== Religious architecture ===
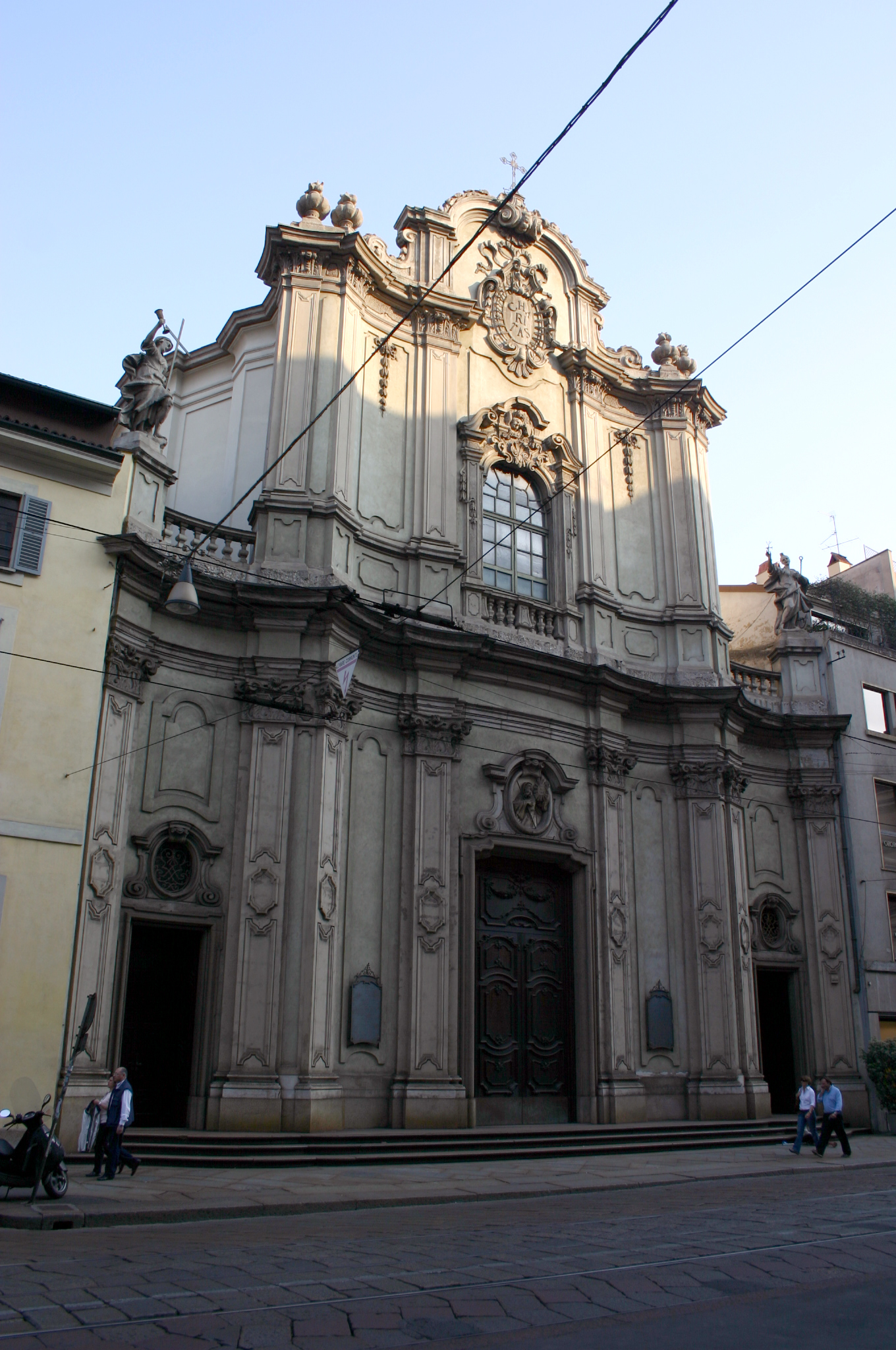
Church of San Francesco di Paola

Despite the revival and dominance of private urban residences, the sacred architecture of the early 18th century was still very much present in the city.

The church of St. Francis of Paola dates back to 1728, and although the facade was not completed until a century later, it was built respecting the original Baroque style. The facade is curved, and is divided into two orders divided by a rather projecting cornice; the second floor has three portals surmounted by pediments or elliptical windows, and is punctuated by eight Corinthian lesenes. The upper order has on its sides two terraces with balustrades supporting two statues of Faith and Hope; in the center is a lavishly decorated window, surmounted by a coat of arms bearing the motto “CHARITAS” of the church's titular saint.

The interior has a single nave: of particular interest are the Baroque-era organ on the counter façade, the frescoes on the vault by Carlo Maria Giudici depicting the Glory of St. Francis of Paola, and the marble ovals by Giuseppe Perego. Dating from 1753 is the high altar with monumental forms by architect Giuseppe Buzzi of Viggiù, made of polychrome marble.

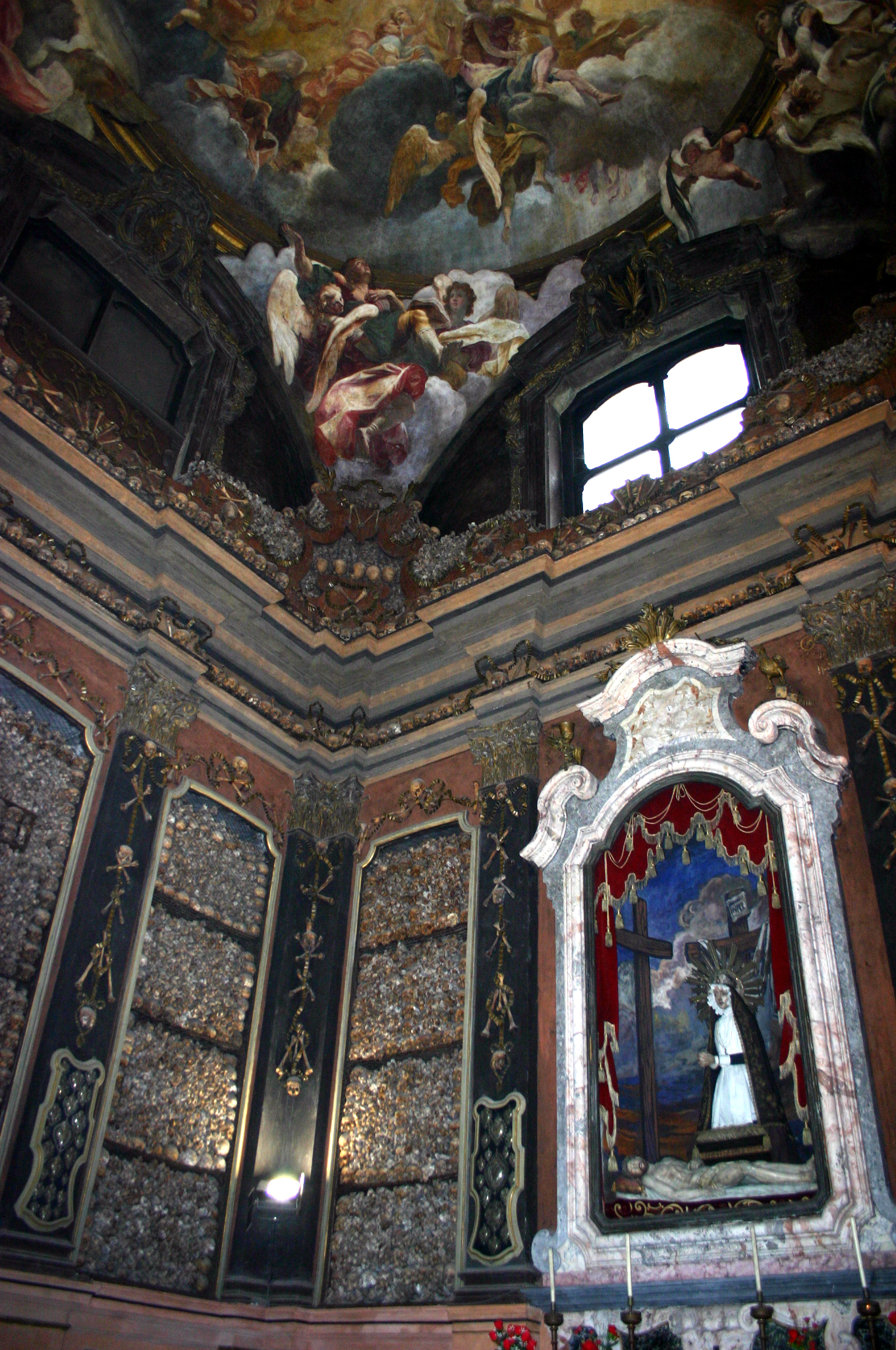
Ossuary of San Bernardino alle ossa

Famous more for its distinctiveness than for its artistic value, the church of San Bernardino alle Ossa saw its completion in 1750 based on a design by architect Carlo Giuseppe Merlo, who conceived a structure with a central plan crowned by an octagonal dome: the church has a single nave and features two chapels dedicated to St. Mary Magdalene and St. Rosalia, both decorated with marble altars. The façade is what remains of the old church that was destroyed in a fire, the work of Carlo Buzzi, and looks more like a palace than a church: divided into three orders, the first on the ground floor has portals and windows adorned with scrolled pediments, while the upper orders have broken gable pediments.

Inside the church, on the right side, is the most peculiar part of the complex, namely the ossuary: in addition to the sumptuous marble altar by Gerolamo Cattaneo and frescoes on the vault by Sebastiano Ricci of the Triumph of Souls among Angels (1695), one can see the walls almost completely covered with human skulls and bones, sometimes creating real motifs and decorations.

Left unfinished, the church of Santa Maria della Sanità was begun in the late seventeenth century, but was redesigned and completed by Carlo Federico Pietrasanta in the early eighteenth century: the unfinishedness is immediately visible from the brick facade and without decorations, however, it is well recognizable by the alternation of concavity and convexity and the peculiar “cello” shape as well as the “marshal's cocked hat” pediment. The interior has a single nave with an elliptical shape and five chapels, among which is the chapel dedicated to St. Camillus de Lellis with a marble altar with bronze inserts and a painting of the Assumption in the choir as well as a fresco of the Assumption of the Virgin (1717) on the vault by Pietro Maggi.

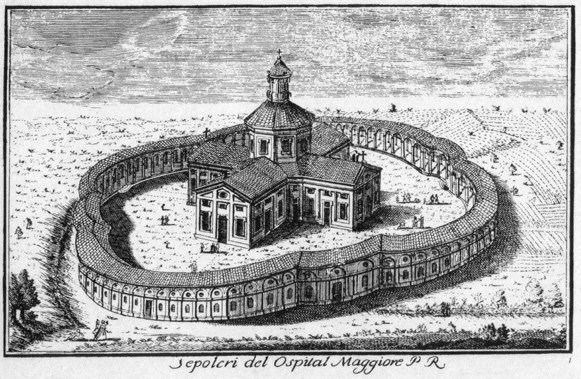
Marcantonio Dal Re – Views of Milan, Sepulchres of the Ospital Maggiore (Rotonda della Besana)

The church of St. Peter Celestine, designed by Mario Bianchi in 1735, was erected on an old 14th-century monastery. The facade is curved, with a layout quite similar to that of St. Francis of Paola; built of sandstone, a restoration was necessary in the early 20th century, which involved reconstructing the facade in decorative concrete. The facade differs from the church of St. Francis of Paola in the ornate columns of the portal, topped by a sculpture of the church's titular saint, and the richly decorated scrollwork cymatium. The interior consists of a single nave punctuated by lesenes, with five side chapels; above the 18th-century high altar is a complex of Carrara marble sculptures of angels and a late 16th-century painting by Giovanni Battista Trotti depicting Jesus Christ and Mary Magdalene.

Instead, for the use of the Ospedale Maggiore, the church of San Michele ai Nuovi Sepolcri was erected along with the Rotonda della Besana complex, which for about eighty years served as the burial place of the Milanese hospital complex. Outside, the brick walls follow a quadrilobed shape, hence the name rotonda, at the center of which is the Greek-cross cemetery church, with a dome hidden by the octagonal tiburium, designed by Francesco Croce: the church was built from 1696, and the perimeter from 1713.

=== Painting ===
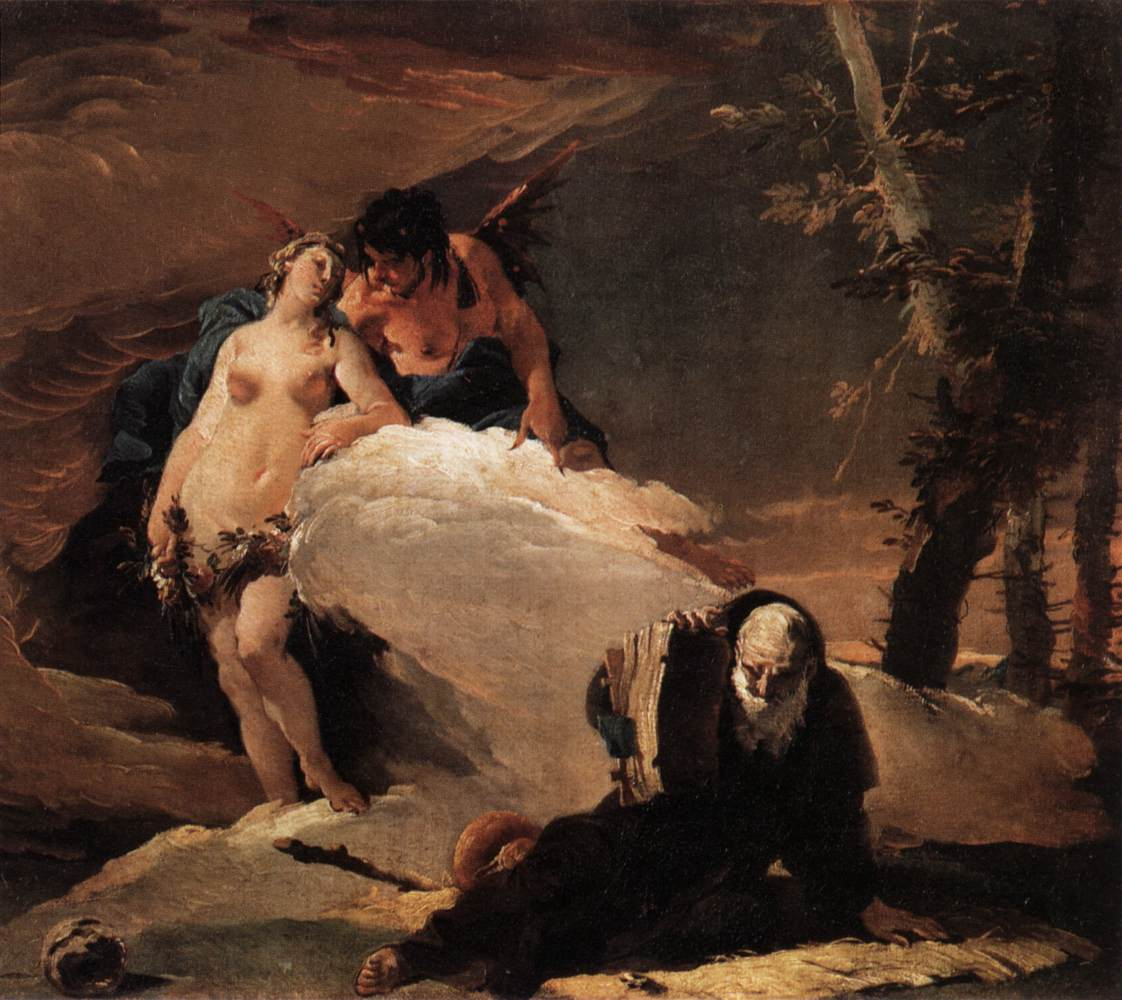
Giambattista Tiepolo - The Temptation of Saint Anthony, Pinacoteca di Brera

Milanese eighteenth-century painting at the beginning of the century shows strong signs of continuity with the artistic tradition of the late seventeenth century, and the protagonists of the early years in fact took their first steps at the end of the seventeenth century to conclude their activity on the first decade of the eighteenth century.

Among the most important names at the turn of the two centuries Andrea Lanzani, who was in fact very active throughout western Lombardy and in Vienna, can be cited as the most illustrious protagonist of the Milanese and Lombard classicist current along with Legnanino, who, however, would be more influenced by the Genoese Baroque school, while they are contrasted with a more markedly late Baroque background by Filippo Abbiati and Paolo Pagani with a painting influenced by the Venetian and Lombard schools. The Milanese work experience of Sebastiano Ricci, where he was able to meet and compare himself with Alessandro Magnasco, must be considered in its own right: Ricci's Glory of the Purgatory Souls in San Bernardino alle Ossa, in which the influence of Baciccio's Correggism can be observed, is particularly remembered. A summa of the major interpreters of the period just mentioned might have been Palazzo Pagani, now destroyed, in which the numerous paintings were complemented by Legnanino's frescoes in the Sala Grande. Of more markedly Lombard influences, on the other hand, was Carlo Donelli, known as Vimercati, a pupil of Ercole Procaccini the Younger who was particularly influenced by the style of Daniele Crespi and Morazzone.

Later, after the period between the two centuries, the figures of Giovan Battista Sassi, Pietro Antonio Magatti and Giovanni Angelo Borroni can be mentioned in mythological and allegorical painting, the latter's fresco Olympic Scene with the Rape of Ganymede in Palazzo Clerici being of particular note.

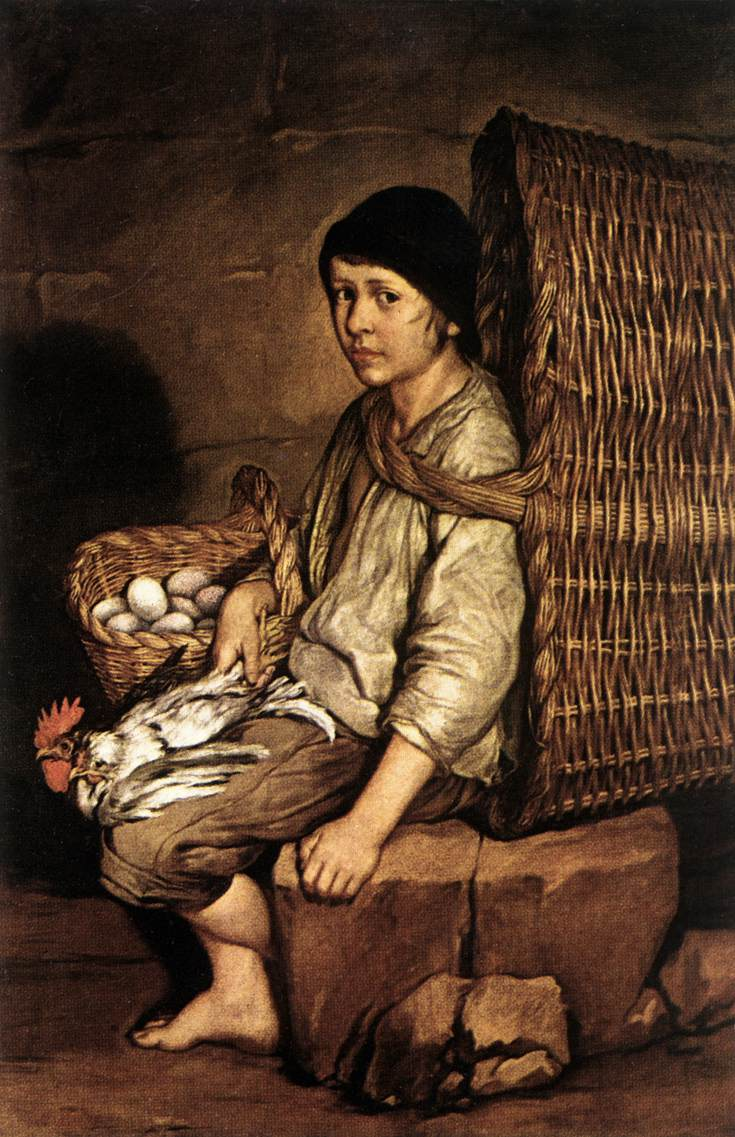
Giacomo Ceruti – Boy with a Basket (1745), Pinacoteca di Brera

Beginning in the third decade of the eighteenth century, there was a change in the taste of the Milanese patrons, who until then had preferred Lombard artists, in favor of the Venetian school, on which Giambattista Pittoni and Tiepolo stand out; of the former, who was also very active outside the city, the work of the Glory of St. Francis de Sales in the monastery is of note, while for Tiepolo the sojourns were multiple and to the prerogative of the city's noble residences. His first Milanese commission was at Palazzo Archinto, where in five rooms he painted a cycle to celebrate the wedding of the patron, explicitly depicted in the fresco of the Triumph of the Arts and Sciences, which was destroyed by bombing in World War II. The painter was a few years later summoned to Palazzo Dugnani where he frescoed the cycles of the Stories of Scipio and Apotheosis of Scipio, passing also through a brief religious commission of the Glory of St. Bernard in a chapel of the church of Sant'Ambrogio, concluding his Milanese stint with the Palazzo Clerici masterpiece of the fresco of the Sun Chariot Race with a mythological theme, from which he would later draw inspiration for the commission of the imperial salon in the Würzburg Residence, also counted among the Rococo masterpieces. Tiepolo's presence was so significant that it established a “Tiepolesque trend,” the greatest exponent of which was Biagio Bellotti, with his pictorial cycles in Palazzo Perego and Palazzo Sormani.

On a par with history, mythological and allegorical painting, a movement of genre painting was thus established in Milan as well as in Lombardy. Among the major exponents are Alessandro Magnasco, who was born in Genoa but trained in Milan; he specialized in certain characteristic figures, such as washerwomen, friars, beggars and soldiers, using a style defined as “touch painting”: moreover, he was accepted into the Milan Academy of St. Luke. Another great exponent of the movement was Vittore Ghislandi, known as Fra Galgario, whose training took place between the Venetian and Milanese milieu, through which he arrived at a more naturalistic style of painting far removed from celebratory painting: of his Milanese sojourns one can mention among the best results the Ritratto di giovinetto (Portrait of a Young Man) and Gentiluomo col tricorno (Gentleman with Tricorn), the latter considered a masterpiece despite being painted at a late age “[...] having his hand somewhat trembling,” both preserved at the Poldi Pezzoli. Completing the panorama of genre painting is Giacomo Ceruti, known as il Pitocchetto, who devoted himself mainly to simple scenes, inspired by the 17th-century French painting of reality typical, for example, of Georges de La Tour: from Ceruti's experience, Francesco Londonio, who can be defined as the last major painter of the late Baroque period in Milan, would draw lessons.

Lastly, it is worth mentioning the tradition of the gallery of the benefactors of Milan's Ospedale Maggiore, which, after having accompanied the whole birth of the Milanese Baroque, also accompanied its conclusion, probably reaching its peak in the first twenty years of the eighteenth century with the works of Filippo Abbiati and Andrea Porta.

== See also ==
- Villas and palaces in Milan
- Gothic art in Milan
- Renaissance in Lombardy
- Art of the late 16th century in Milan
- Neoclassical architecture in Milan
- Art Nouveau in Milan
- History of architecture and art in Milan

== Bibliography ==
- Giovanni Denti (1988). Architettura a Milano tra controriforma e barocco. Firenze: Alinea Editrice.
- Attilia Lanza; Marilea Somarè (1992). Milano e i suoi palazzi - Porta Orientale, Romana e Ticinese. Milano: Libreria Meravigli editrice.
- Attilia Lanza; Marilea Somarè (1993). Milano e i suoi palazzi - Porta Vercellina, Comasina e Nuova. Milano: Libreria Meravigli editrice.
- Pamela M. Jones (1997). Federico Borromeo e l'Ambrosiana: Arte e Riforma cattolica nel XVII secolo a Milano. Milano: Vita e Pensiero.
- AA.VV. (1998). Touring Club Italiano: Guida d'Italia - Milano (Guide rosse d'Italia ed.). Milano: Touring Club Editore.
- Eugenia Bianchi; Stefania Buganza (1999). Il Seicento e il Settecento - Itinerari di Milano e provincia. Milano: NodoLibri.
- Valerio Terraroli (2004). Lombardia barocca e tardobarocca. Milano: Skira editore.
- Simonetta Coppa; Federica Bianchi (2009). Lombardia barocca. Milano: Jaca Book.
