= Zanata =

Zanata may refer to:

- Zanata or Zenata, group of Berber tribes which, in antiquity, inhabited an area stretching from west of Egypt to Morocco with the Sanhaja and Masmud
- Zanata Stone, small stele with engravings
- Carlos Alberto Zanata Amato, Brazilian association football defensive midfielder
- Giuseppe Zanata, Italian painter of the Baroque period
- Rita de Cássia Peres Teixeira Zanata, Brazilian volleyball player
- Zanata, web-based translation software

== See also ==
- Zanatta, a surname
