= Giuseppe Nuvolone =

Italian painter (1619–1703)

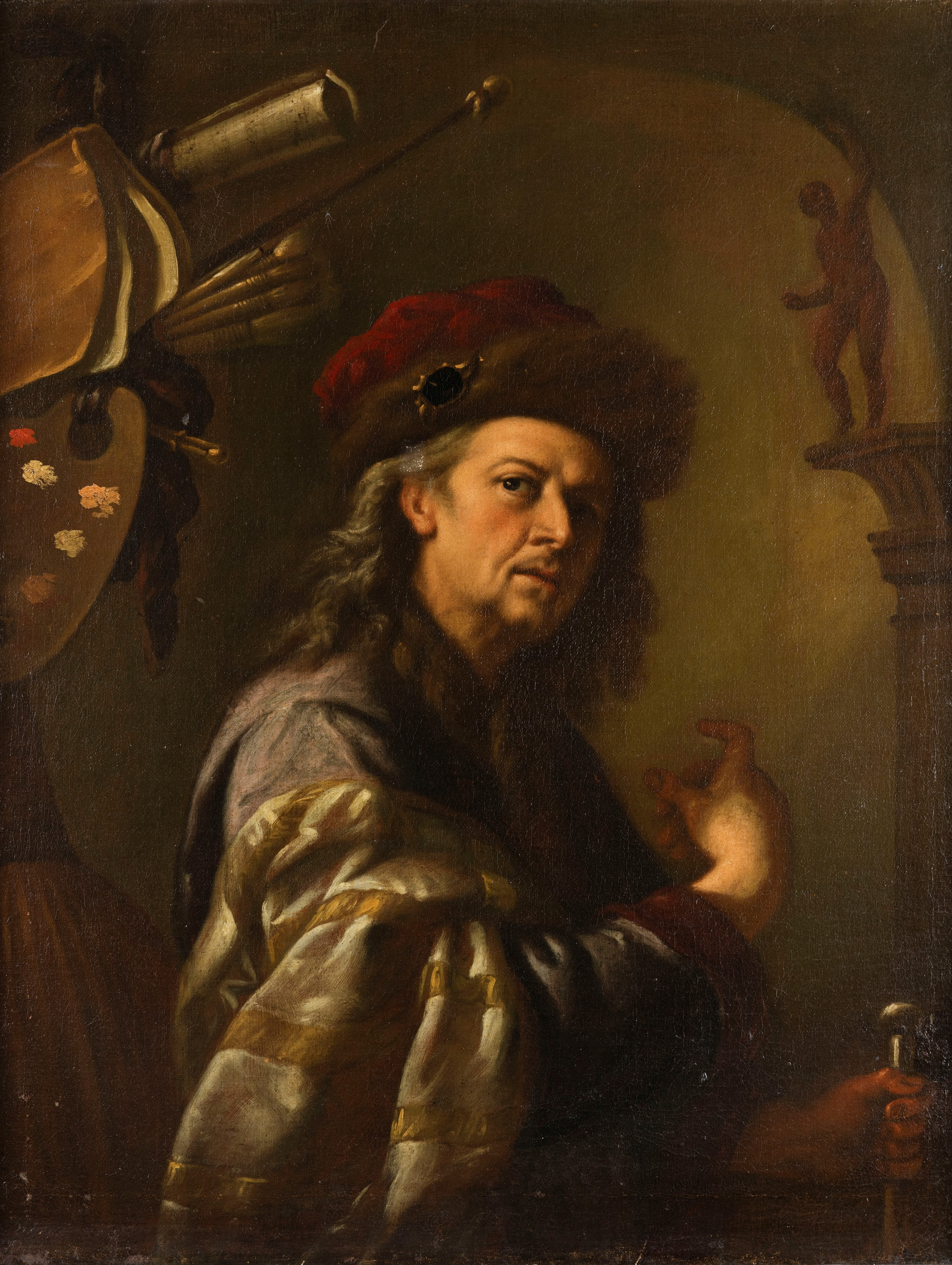
Self-portrait between 1665 and 1670, priv. col.

Giuseppe Nuvolone (1619 – 1703) was an Italian painter of the Baroque period, active mainly in Milan, Brescia, and Cremona.

== Life and works ==
Giuseppe Nuvolone was born in Milan in 1619. He was the brother of the painter Carlo Francesco Nuvolone and son of Panfilo. Like his brother, he studied first under his father, and afterwards under Giulio Cesare Procaccini. Heavily influenced by his brother's style, later in his life he came under the influence of Genoese painting, apparent in works such as the Flagellation (Milan, Basilica of San Simpliciano). He collaborated with his brother in the frescoes for the Sacro Monte di Orta (1654) and in those for San Francesco, Trecate (1660). His most accomplished works are the biblical scenes in the Herzog Anton Ulrich Museum in Braunschweig. Giuseppe was also a portrait painter, his best works in this genre including the Self-portrait (Milan, Pinacoteca di Brera) and the portrait of Fortunato Vinaccesi (Brescia, Pinacoteca Tosio Martinengo). Giuseppe died in Milan in 1703. His son Carlo Nuvolone was also a painter, specializing in quadratura and active mainly in Cremona.

Paintings by Giuseppe Nuvolone

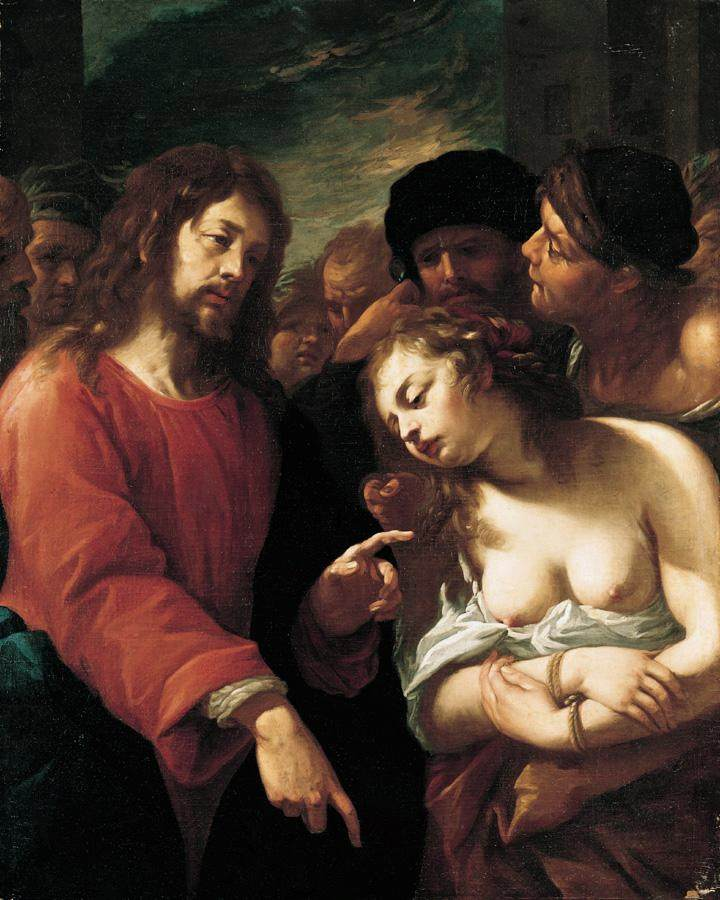
Christ and the Woman Taken in Adultery second half of 17th century, priv. col.

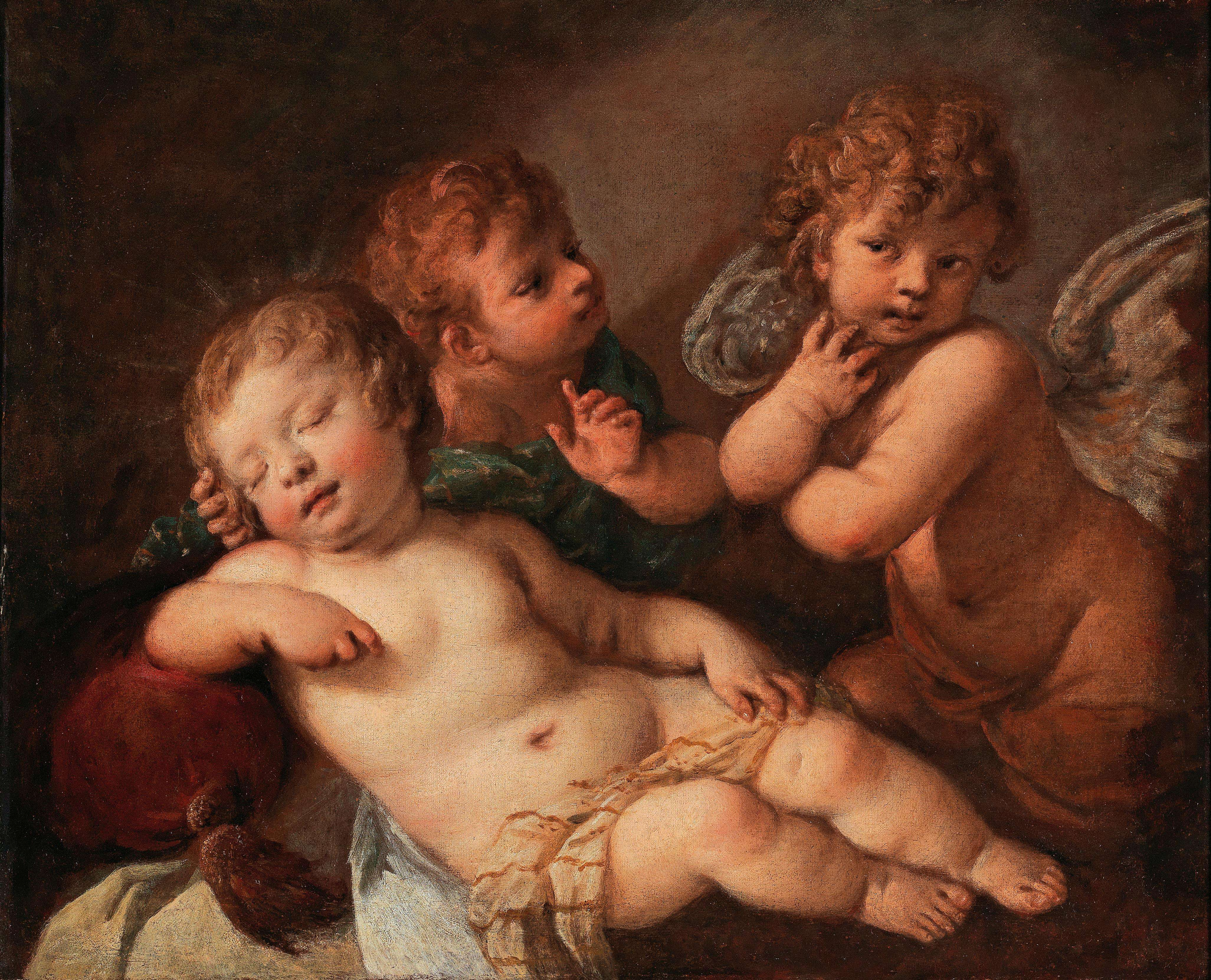
The Infants Christ and St. John, third quarter of 17th century, priv. col.

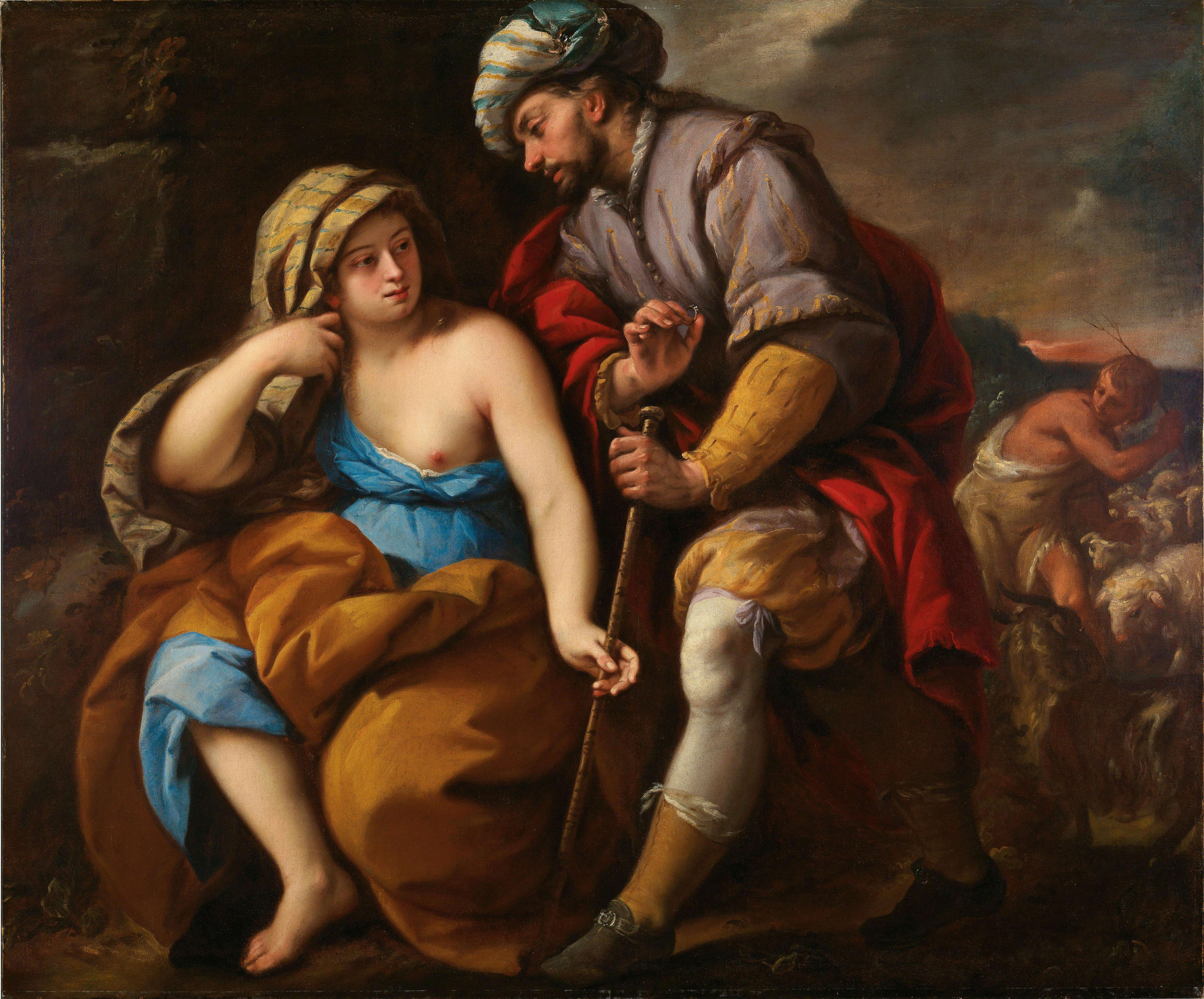
Tamar and Judah, c. 1680, priv. col.

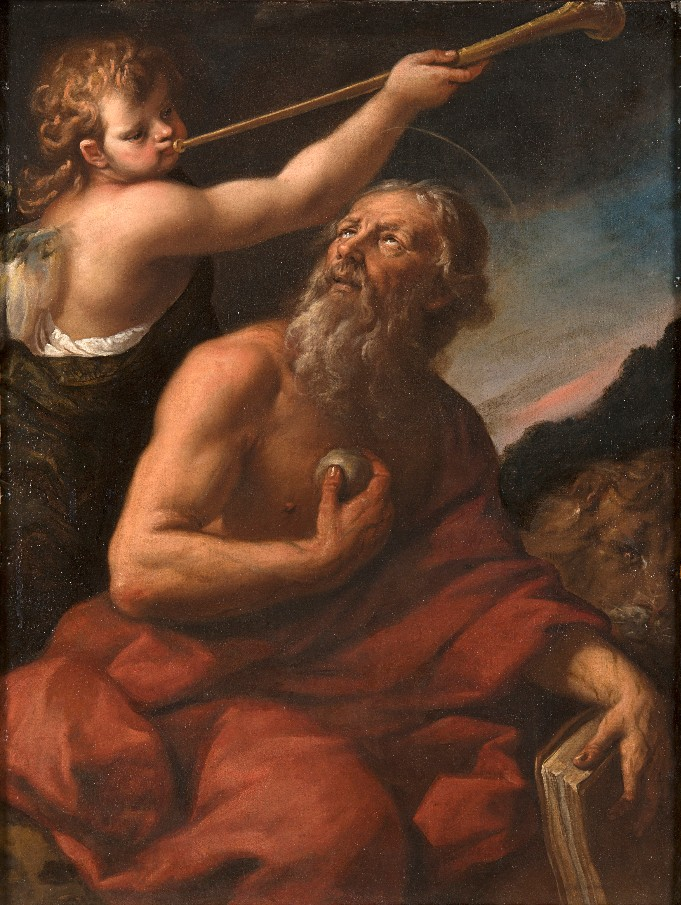
St. Jerome, priv. col.

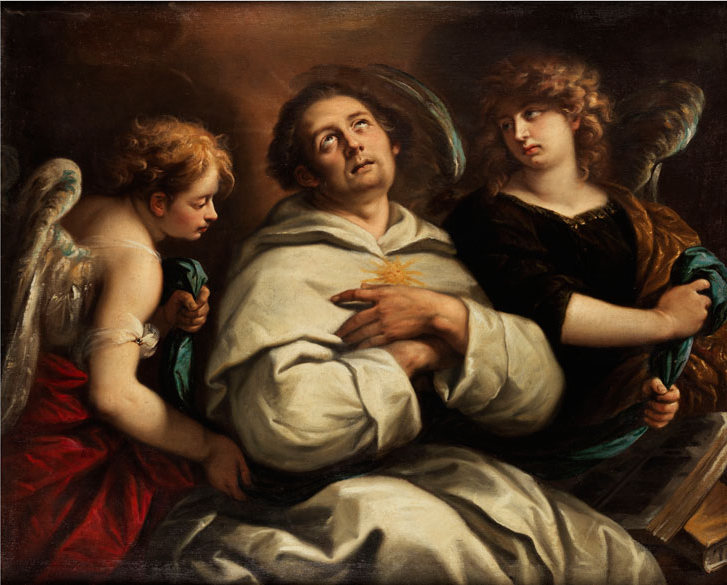
St. Bernard, priv. col.

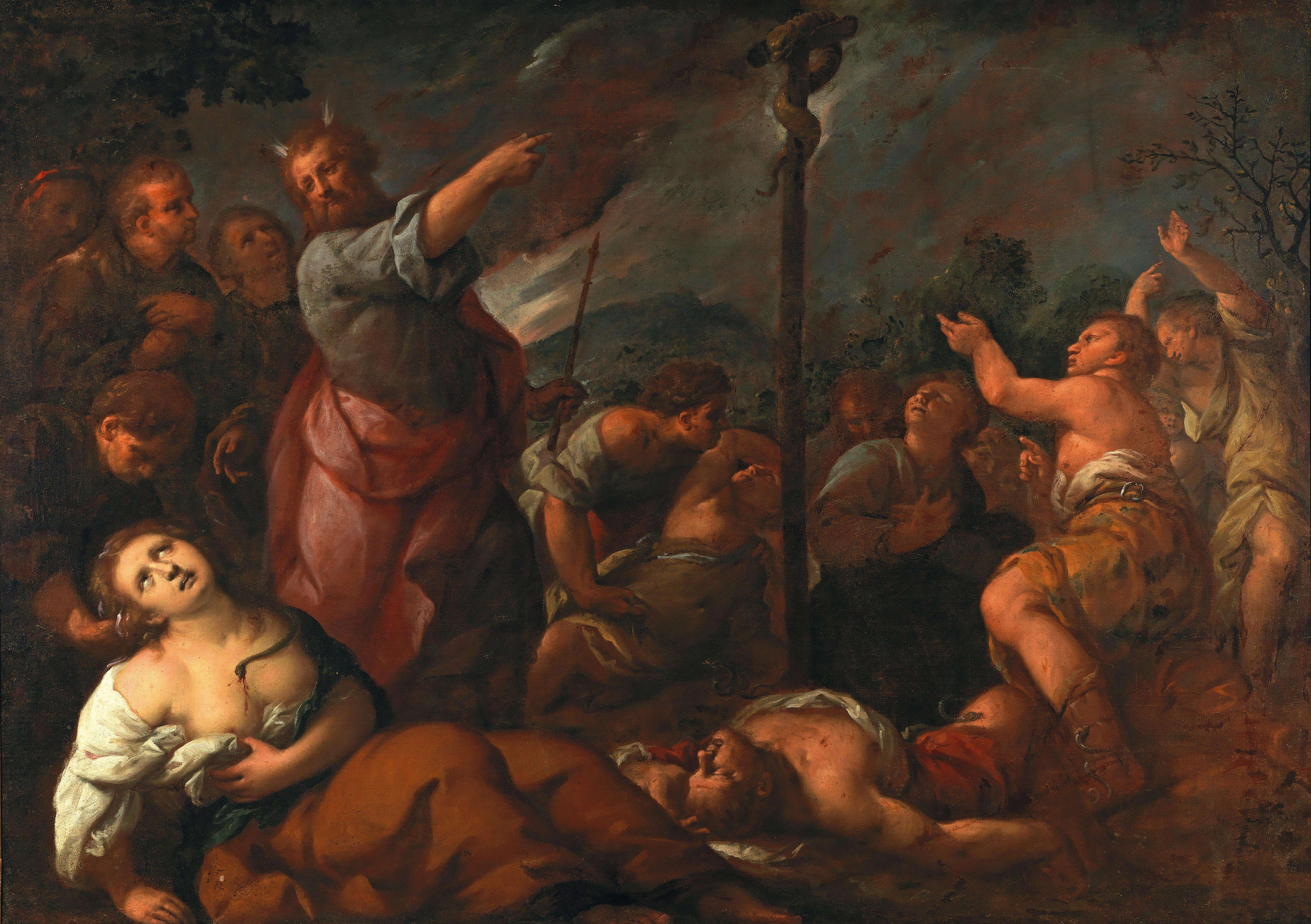
Moses and the brazen serpent, priv. col.

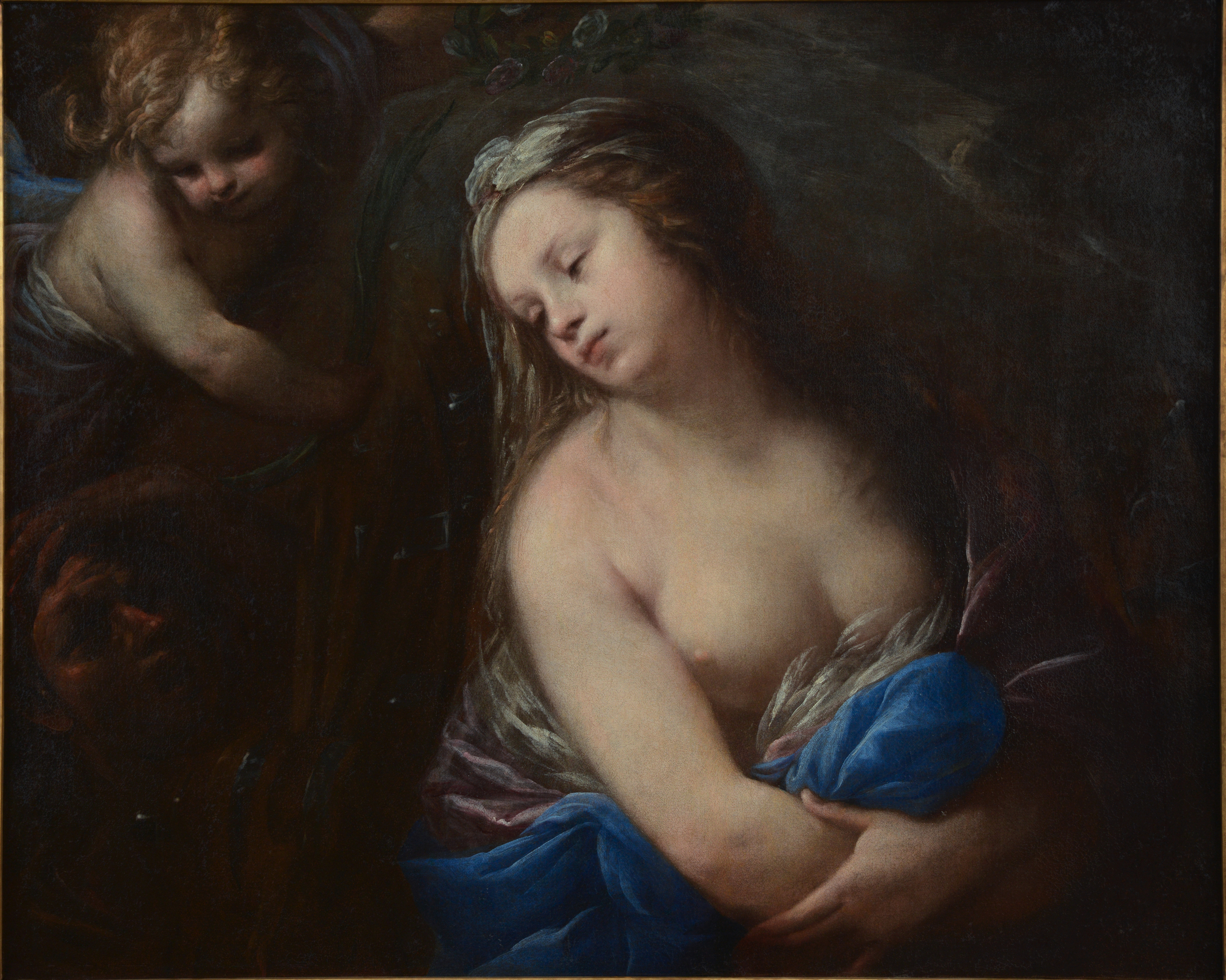
St. Catherine of Alexandria, priv. col.

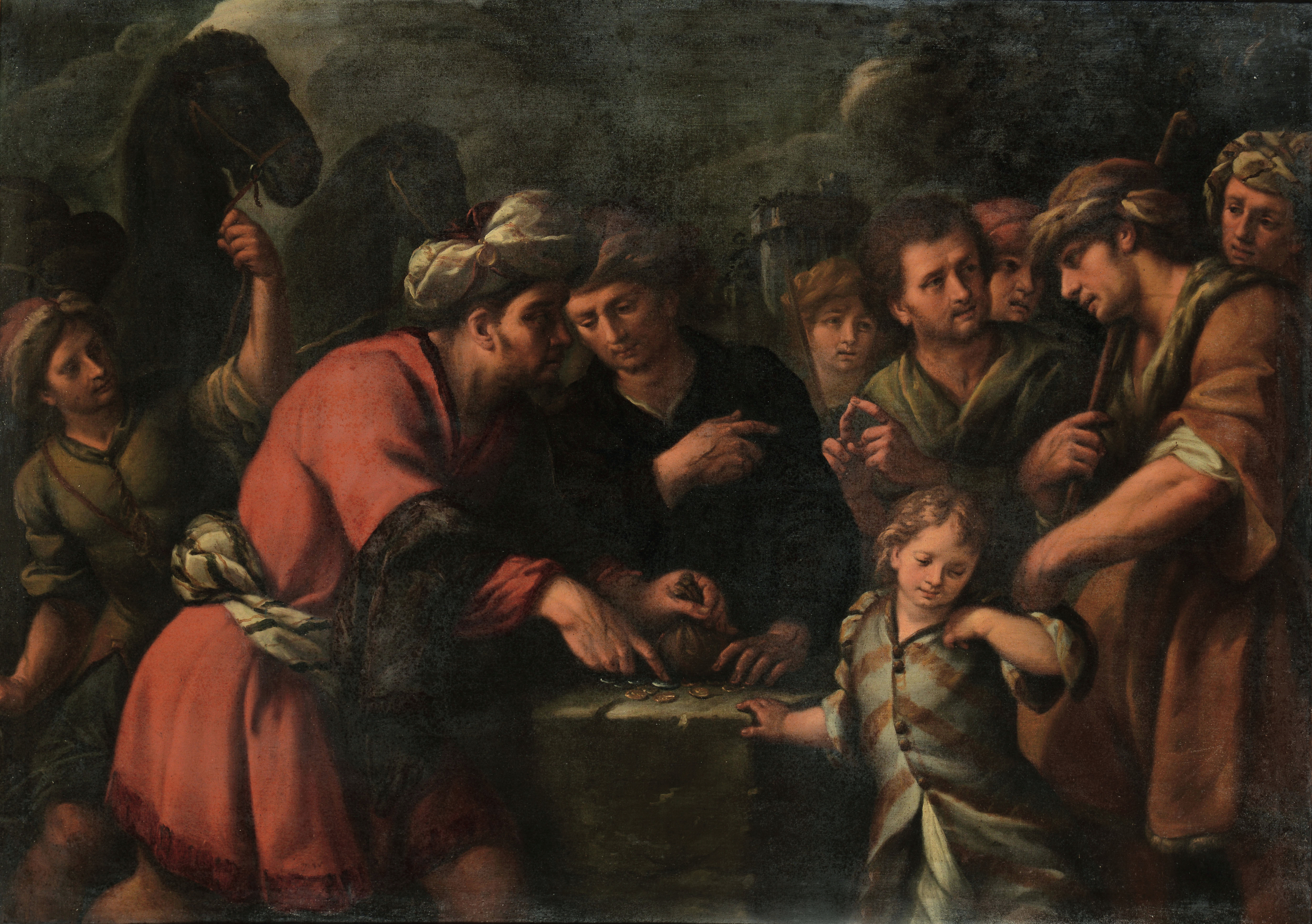
Joseph sold by his brothers, priv. col.
