= Rito della Nivola =

Catholic liturgical rite practiced in Milan, Italy

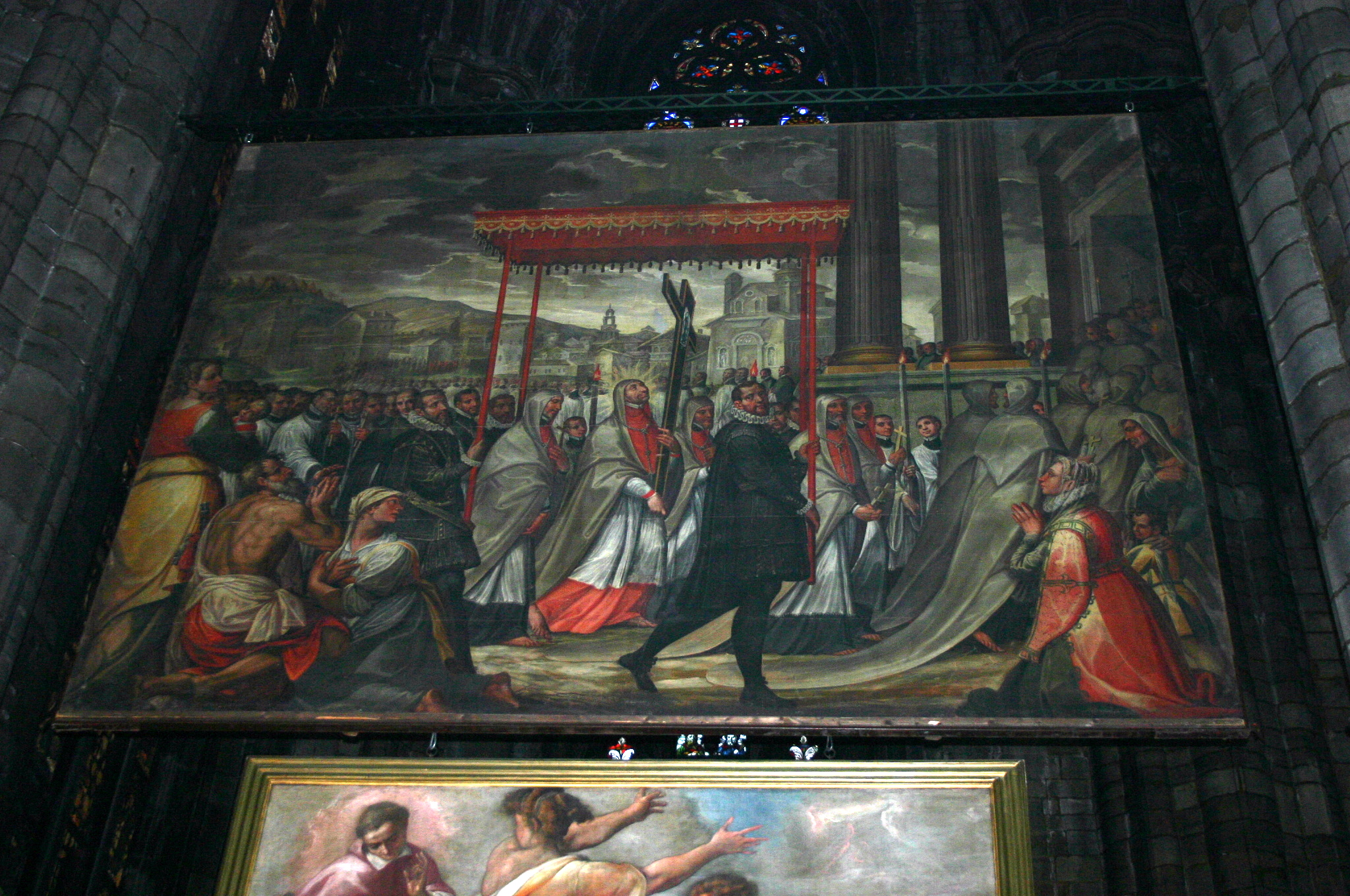
Cathedral of Milan: Carlo Borromeo celebrating the Holy Nail, painting by Gian Battista della Rovere (Fiammenghino)

The Rite of the Nivola (in Italian Rito della Nivola) is a Catholic liturgical rite (part of the Ambrosian Rite) as well as a historical reenactment that is celebrated yearly in the Duomo (Cathedral) of Milan, Italy; the tradition dates back to the 16th century and was initiated by Carlo Borromeo. It is a celebration of the "Santo Chiodo" (Holy Nail), purportedly a nail from the True Cross, which is regarded as the most important relic owned by the Archdiocese of Milan. The relic is also known as the "Santo Morso" (Holy Bridle), as it is in fact shaped in a way that may resemble a part of a bridle. It is preserved in the apse of the Cathedral, in a case inside a tabernacle, about 45 m above the ground.

By chance, the rite is not named after the relic; rather, it owes its name to the Nivola (/'ni-ula/, Lombard for "cloud"), a sort of lift shaped like a cloud, that is used during the rite by the Archbishop to reach the tabernacle of the Holy Nail. This Nivola itself dates back at least to the 16th century, and its design or realization are sometimes credited to Leonardo da Vinci. It is composed of a large basket, 3 m long and about as wide, weighing about 800 kg, and lifted by hoists. The decorations of the lift, comprising drapes and paintings of angels and cherubs, were added over time; the paintings, in particular, were reportedly created in 1612 by the Milanese painter Paolo Camillo Landriani. In origin, the Nivola was operated by two dozens of men from the roof of the Duomo; nowadays, it has been mechanized.

The Rite of the Nivola is traditionally celebrated once a year. The tradition was established by Carlo Borromeo, who chose to celebrate the rite on May 3 (feast of the Invention of the Holy Cross), a date that was kept until the mid 20th century; it was later changed to September 14 after Pope John XXIII abolished the May 3 holiday.

The rite is open to the public but a reservation is needed, to be acquired from the Veneranda Fabbrica del Duomo offices. There are two days a year when the Nivola can be seen in action; when the Holy Nail is retrieved from its case, on September 14, and when it is put back, about two weeks later.
