= Zanatta =

Zanatta is a surname. Notable people with the surname include:

- Dario Zanatta (born 1997), Canadian soccer player
- Gustavo Zanatta (born 1951), Mexican politician
- Ivano Zanatta (born 1960), Canadian ice hockey coach
- Luca Zanatta (born 1991), Italian ice hockey player
- Marino Zanatta (born 1947), Italian basketball player
- Michela Zanatta (born 1978), Italian runner
- Néstor Zanatta (born 1973), Argentine footballer
- Sergio Zanatta (born 1946), Canadian soccer player
- Stefano Zanatta (born 1964), Italian cyclist

== See also ==
- Zanata (disambiguation)
