= Pietro Maggi =

Italian painter

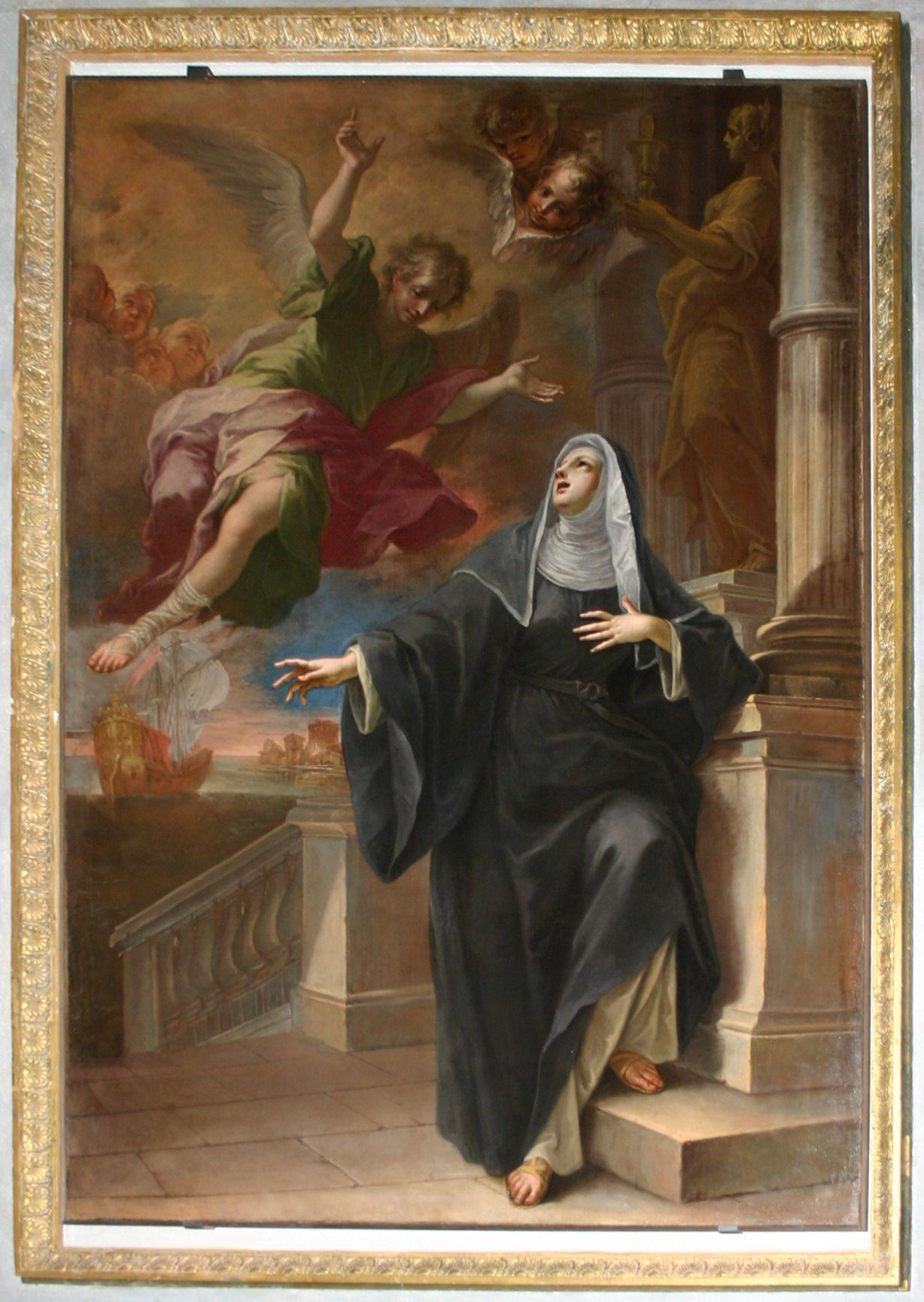
Apparition of the Angel with Saint Monica (1714), Chiesa di San Marco (Milano): Apparizione dell'angelo a S. Monica, di Pietro Maggi (1714).

Pietro Maggi (Milan, c. 1680 – Milan, before 1738) was an Italian painter of the late-Baroque period.

== Biography ==
He was influenced by Carlo Francesco Nuvolone (died 1702) but studied and worked with Filippo Abbiati. Together they painted frescoes (1707) for the cupola of San Nazaro in Brolo (Milan). His other fresco was the Night of Hercules (or Heracles) and Hebe (Le nozze di Ercole e Ebe) at the upper hall in the Palazzo Durini in Milan. Other works of Maggi include a Madonna and St Joseph (1713) for the church of San Guadenzio in Varallo Sesia an Assumption of the Virgin for the church of Santa Maria dei Crociferi in Milan, and a Resurrection for the church of Santa Maria di Canepanova in Pavia.
