= Santa Maria della Sanità, Milan =

Roman Catholic church in Milan, Italy

Coordinates: 45.46453°N 9.19837°E

Church of Saint Mary of Health (Chiesa di Santa Maria della Sanità)
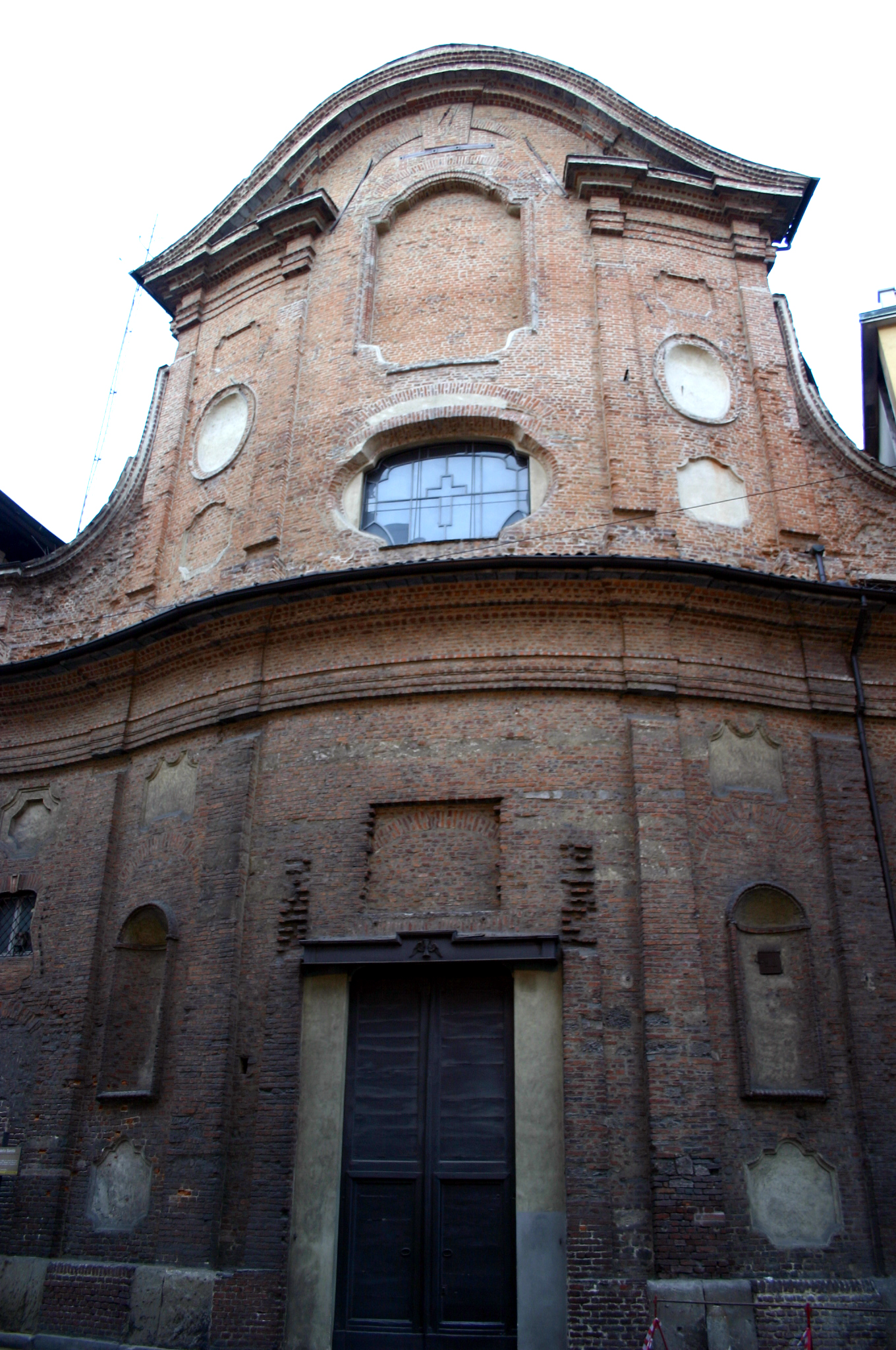
- Facade

Religion
- Affiliation: Roman Catholic
- Province: Milan
- Status: Active

Location
- Location: Via Durini 19,Milan, Italy
- Interactive map of Church of Saint Mary of Health (Chiesa di Santa Maria della Sanità)

Architecture
- Architects: Giovanni Battista Quadrio and Carlo Federico Pietrasanta
- Type: Church
- Style: Late-Baroque or Rococo
- Groundbreaking: 1694
- Completed: 1708

Santa Maria della Sanità also known as dei Crociferi, is a late-Baroque or Rococo style, Roman Catholic church located on Via Durini #19 in Milan, in the region of Lombardy in Italy.

== History ==
The church was commissioned by the Camillian order, who were also known as the Crociferi, and design of the church with its five chapels was originally by Giovanni Battista Quadrio. The undulating facade, described as a violoncello and with a roofline in the shape of the late 18th century marshal's bicorn hat, was designed by Carlo Federico Pietrasanta. The facade remains in brick, and never finished with marble decoration.

The adjacent Collegio of the Camillians was privatized when the order was suppressed in 1799 and is now divided into apartments.

Inside the church, Ferdinando Porta painted the St Joseph in Agony and Pietro Maggi painted the Assumption of the Virgin in the choir.
