= Giuseppe Rivola =

Italian painter (d. 1740)

Giuseppe Rivola was an Italian painter of the Baroque period. He was a pupil of Filippo Abbiati, and died in 1740.
