= Carlo Francesco Nuvolone =

Italian painter (1608 or 1609 – 1661 or 1662)

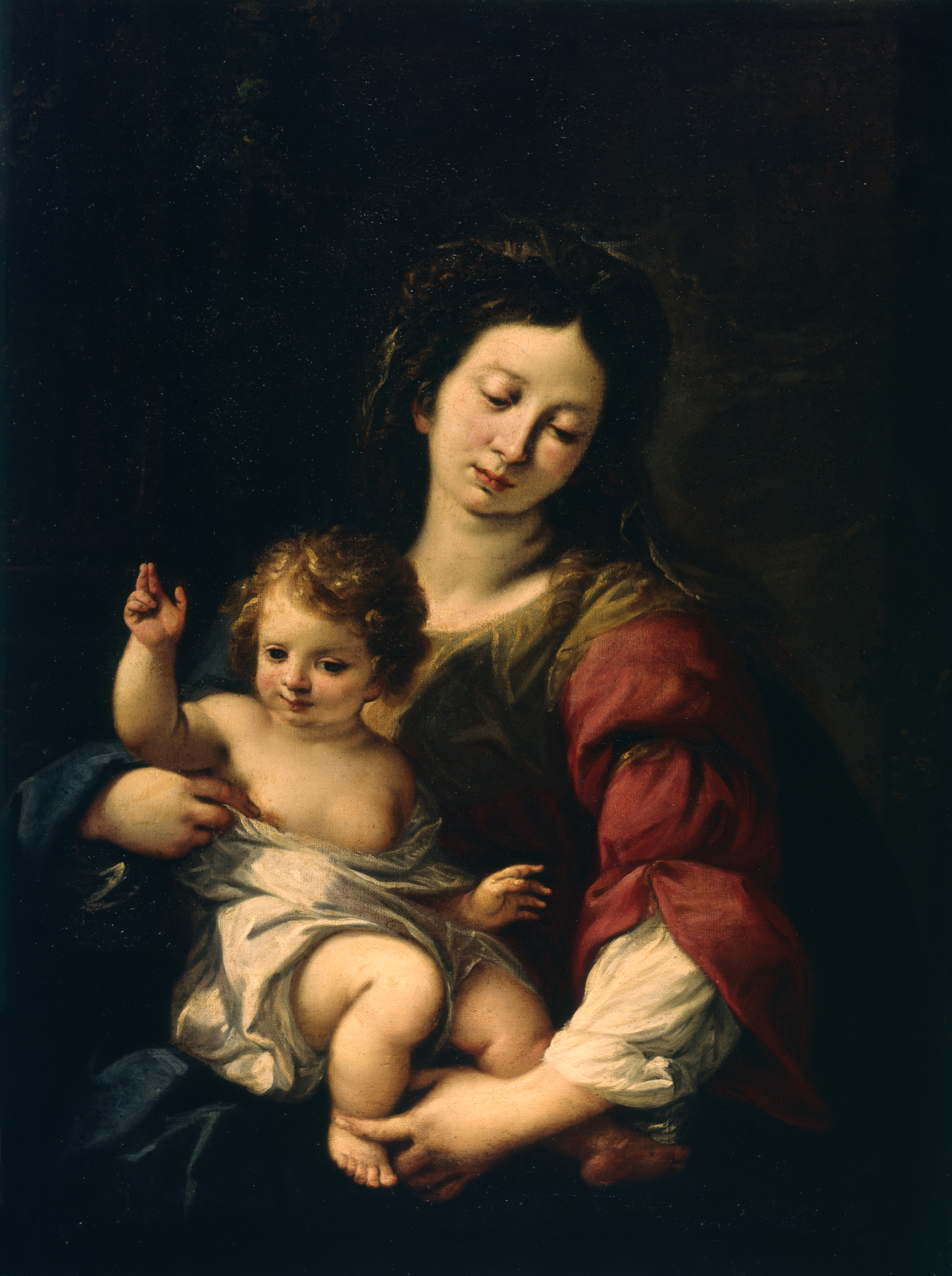
- Madonna and Child, Walters Art Museum, Baltimore
- Born: c. 1608; Milan, Duchy of Milan
- Died: 1 August 1661 (aged 52–53); Milan, Duchy of Milan
- Education: Giovanni Battista Crespi
- Known for: Religious painting
- Movement: Mannerism; Milanese Baroque
- Parent(s): Panfilo Nuvolone and Isabella Nuvolone
- Relatives: Giuseppe Nuvolone (brother)

Carlo Francesco Nuvolone (1608 or 1609 – 1661 or 1662) was an Italian painter of religious subjects and portraits who was active mainly in Lombardy. He became the leading painter in Lombardy in the mid-17th century, producing works on canvas as well as frescoes. Because his style was perceived as close to that of Guido Reni he was nicknamed il Guido della Lombardia (the Guido of Lombardy).

== Life ==
Carlo Francesco Nuvolone was born in Milan. His father Panfilo Nuvolone was a painter of frescoes and altarpieces, in a style still linked to late Mannerism, and of still lifes. Carlo Francesco had a brother called Giuseppe who also became a painter.

After working with his father, Carlo Francesco studied at the Accademia Ambrosiana in Milan under Giovanni Battista Crespi (il Cerano). In that studio he would have encountered Daniele Crespi and Giulio Cesare Procaccini.

He later worked in Milan and its environs. During the 1650s, Nuvolone painted frescoes in the Capella di San Michele, Certosa di Pavia, and works for the Sacro Monte di Varese, an important local pilgrimage site, where he frescoed Chapel III with the Nativity and Chapel V with Christ among the Doctors (both 1650). His interest in the dark and passionate art of Francesco Cairo is evident in his St. Peter and St. Clare (1651–52; Milan, Basilica of San Simpliciano) and St. Peter Healing the Lame Man (Milan, San Vittorio), which also dates from the 1650s.

He later executed frescoes for the Sacro Monte di Orta, completing Chapel X with the Confirmation of St. Francis (1654) and later decorating Chapel XVII with the Death of St. Francis. He was assisted by his brother Giuseppe Nuvolone who also collaborated in the frescoes (1660) for San Francesco, Trecate.

Nuvolone died in Milan 1661 or 1662. Among his pupils were Giuseppe Zanata, Federigo Panza, Filippo Abbiati, and Pietro Maggi.

== Work ==
Carlo Francesco Nuvolone worked as an easel painter as well as a fresco artist. His subjects were mainly religious and he realised many altarpieces and devotional works. He also left a number of portraits.

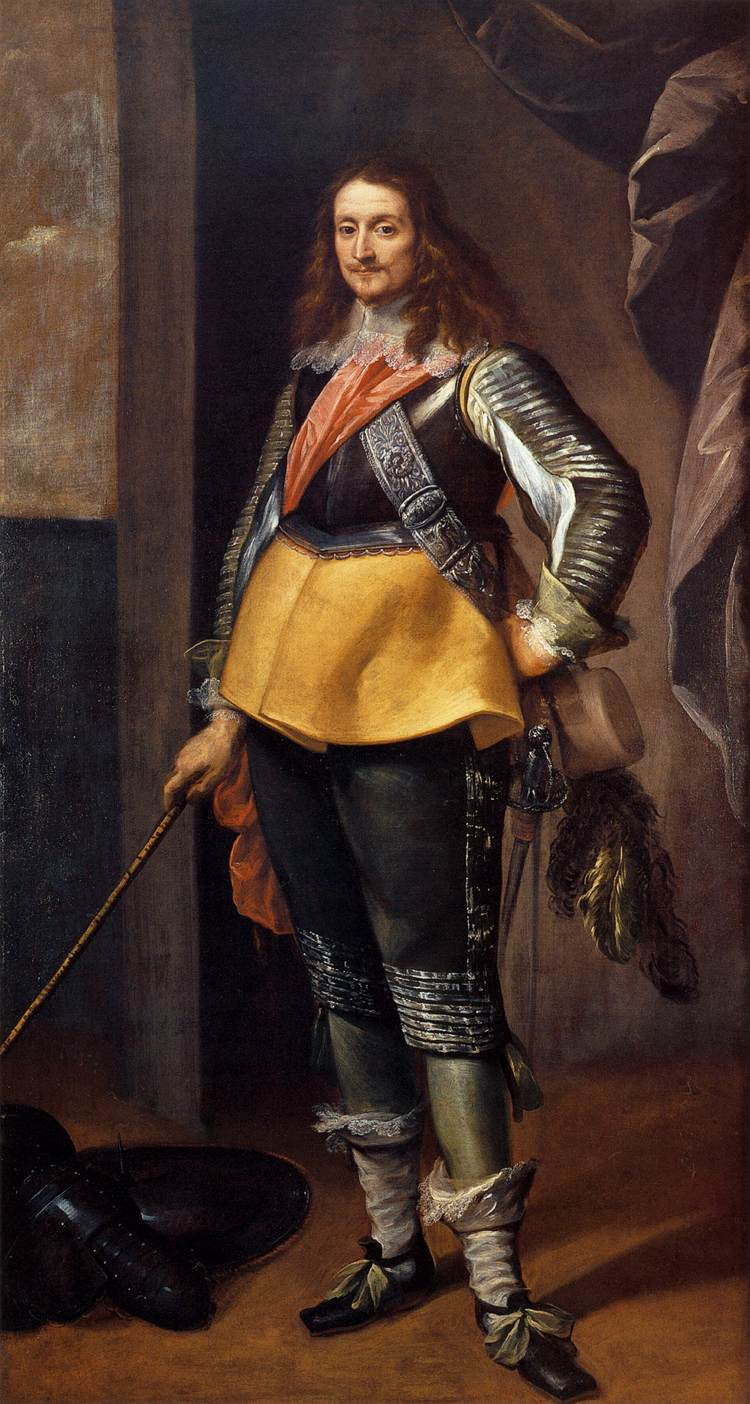
Portrait of a Gentleman in Armour, priv. col.

His early works showed the influence of the latest developments in Lombard painting. He had in particular adopted from Giulio Cesare Procaccini the close attention to the handling of light and shadow as well as the careful study of facial expressions. Other early influences include Daniele Crespi and Francesco Cairo. His first signed and dated work, the Miracle of St. Martha (1636, Venegono Inferiore, Seminario Arcivescovile) also shows the influence of Morazzone. The Death of Lucrezia, executed in several versions, reveals the soft, atmospheric quality of his art, often explained by Murillo's work, although it is not clear where he would have seen Murillo's works.

His altarpieces from the 1640s, such as the Assumption of the Virgin (Pinacoteca di Brera, Milan), demonstrate his interest in Anthony van Dyck. An outstanding example from this period is The purification of the Virgin (1645, Museo Civico, Piacenza).

Nuvolone was also active as a portrait painter working in the Lombard style with its penchant for a strikingly detailed portrayal of the sitter's features and garments and a lively depiction of the play of light and shadow. These portraits also show influences from portrait painting in Genoa, which in turn was influenced by the Flemish portrait painters such as van Dyck who had resided there.

He painted, together with his brother, a portrait of the Nuvolone family showing him at his easel surrounded by his family, including his father and brother and a few young people playing musical instruments.

Paintings by Carlo Francesco Nuvolone

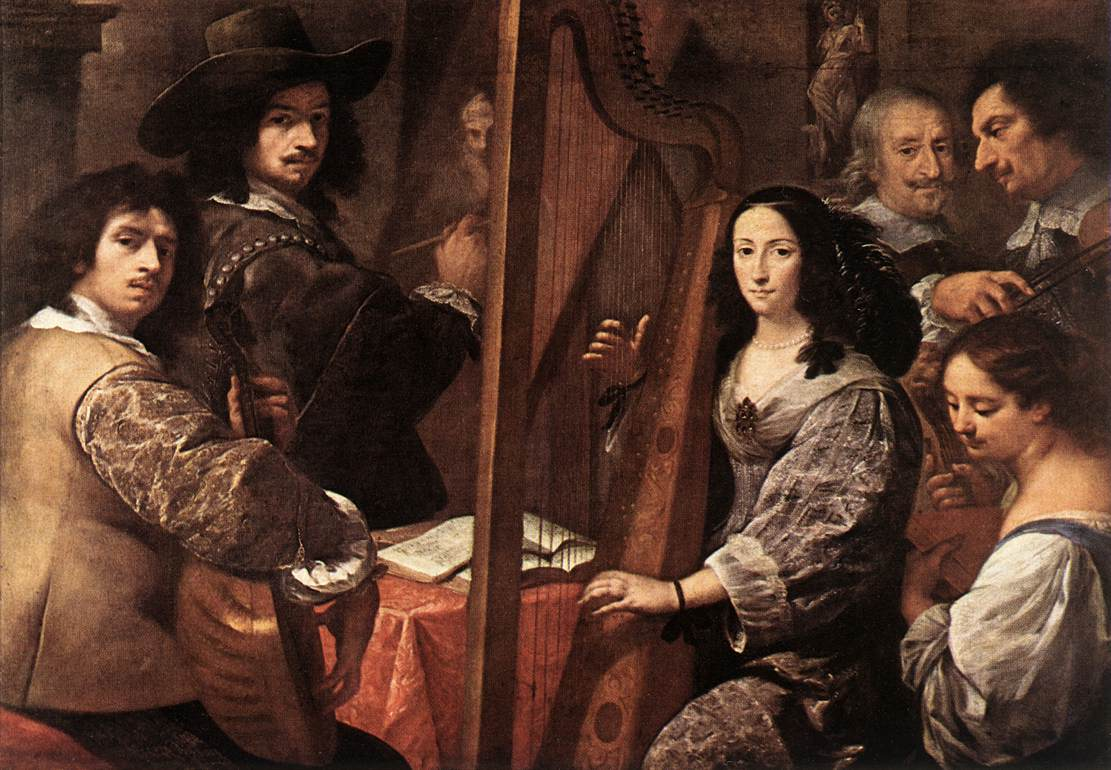
Portrait of the Nuvolone family, Pinacoteca di Brera, Milan

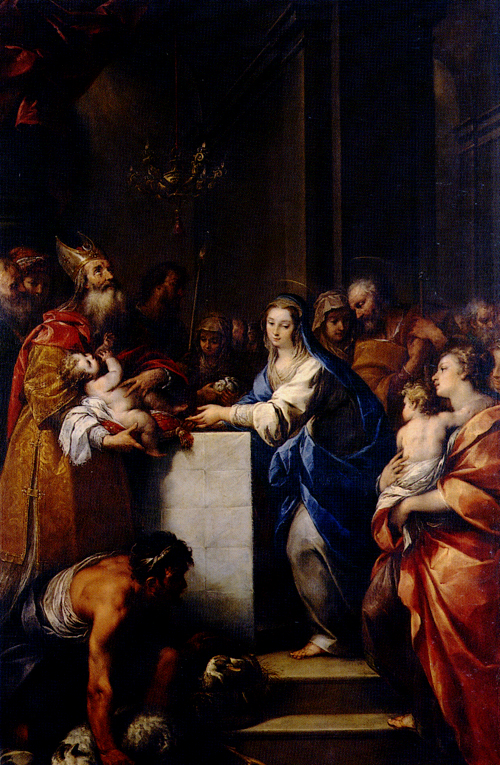
The purification of the Virgin, Piacenza Civic Museum

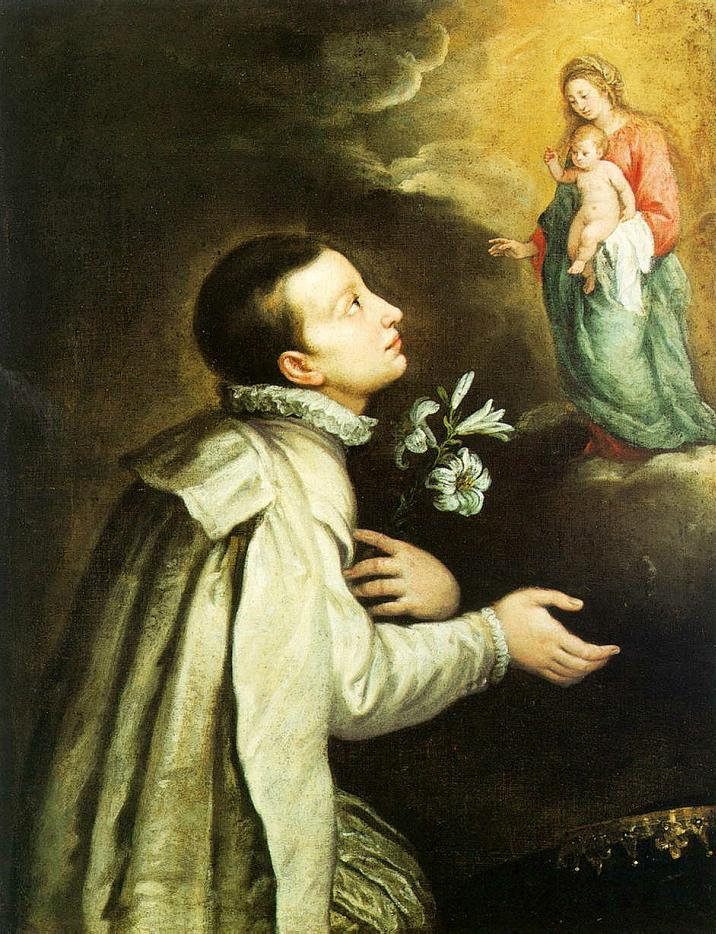
St. Aloysius Gonzaga, priv. col.

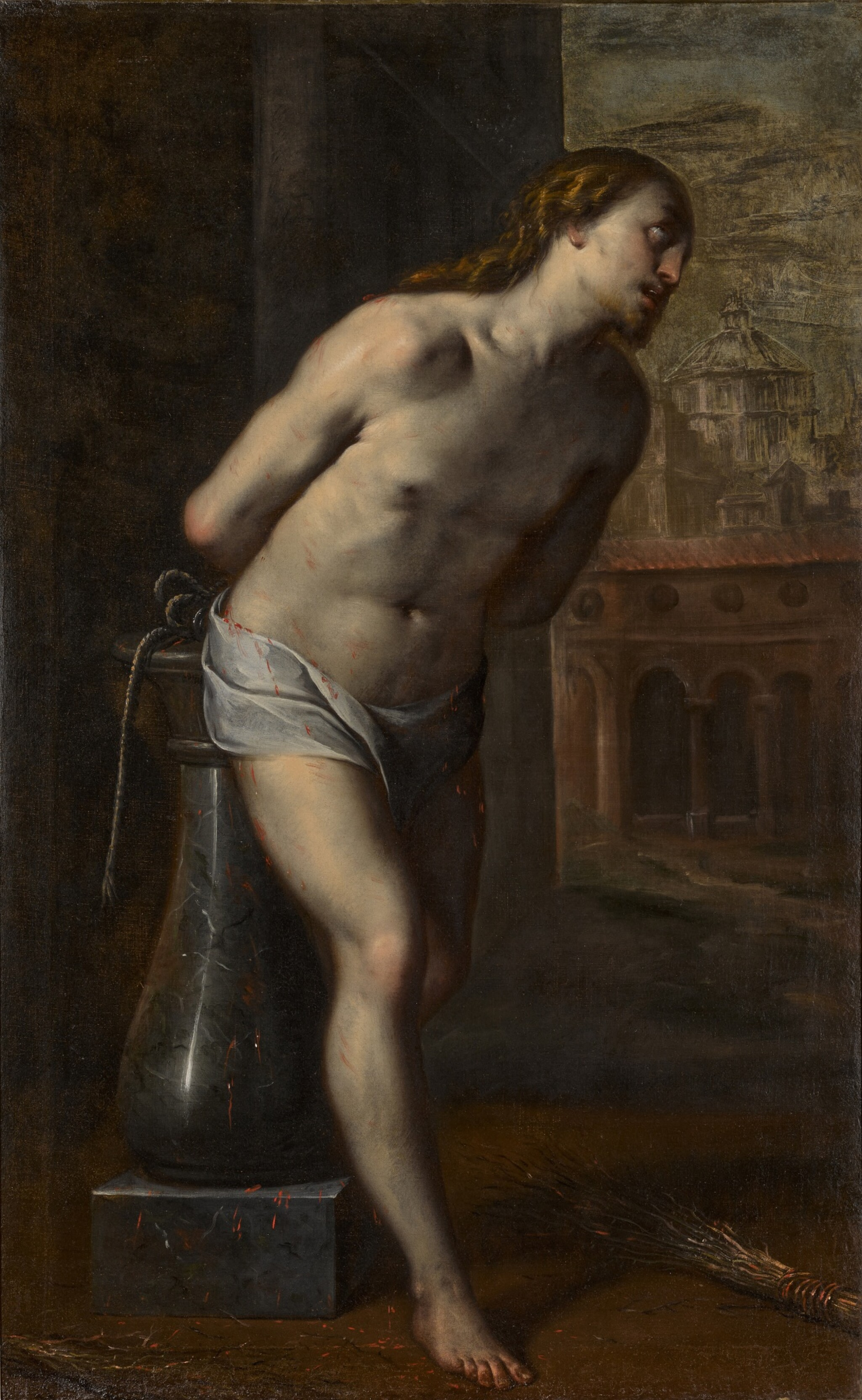
Christ at the column, priv. col.

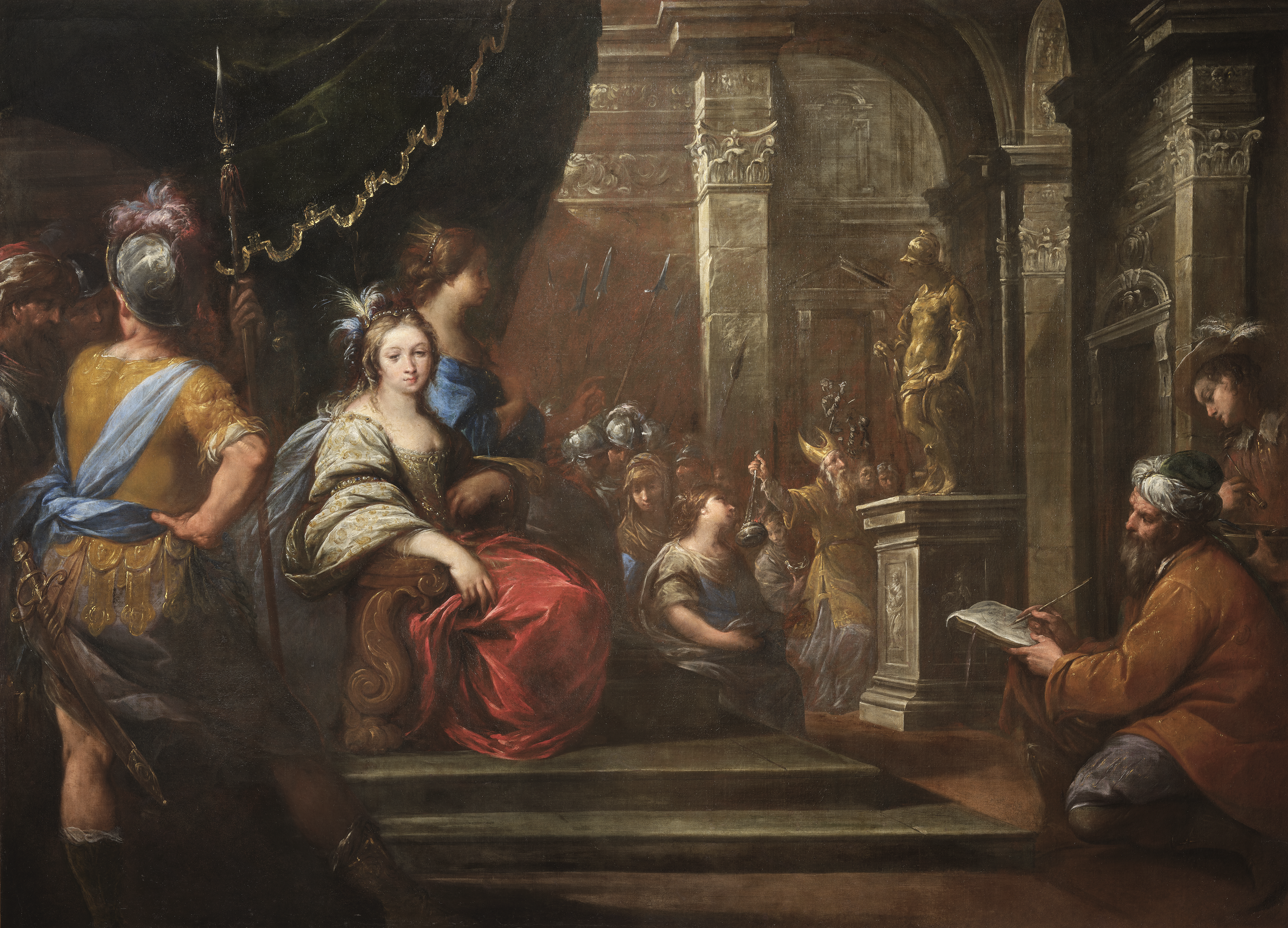
Scene from the life of Esther, Musée des Augustins, Toulouse

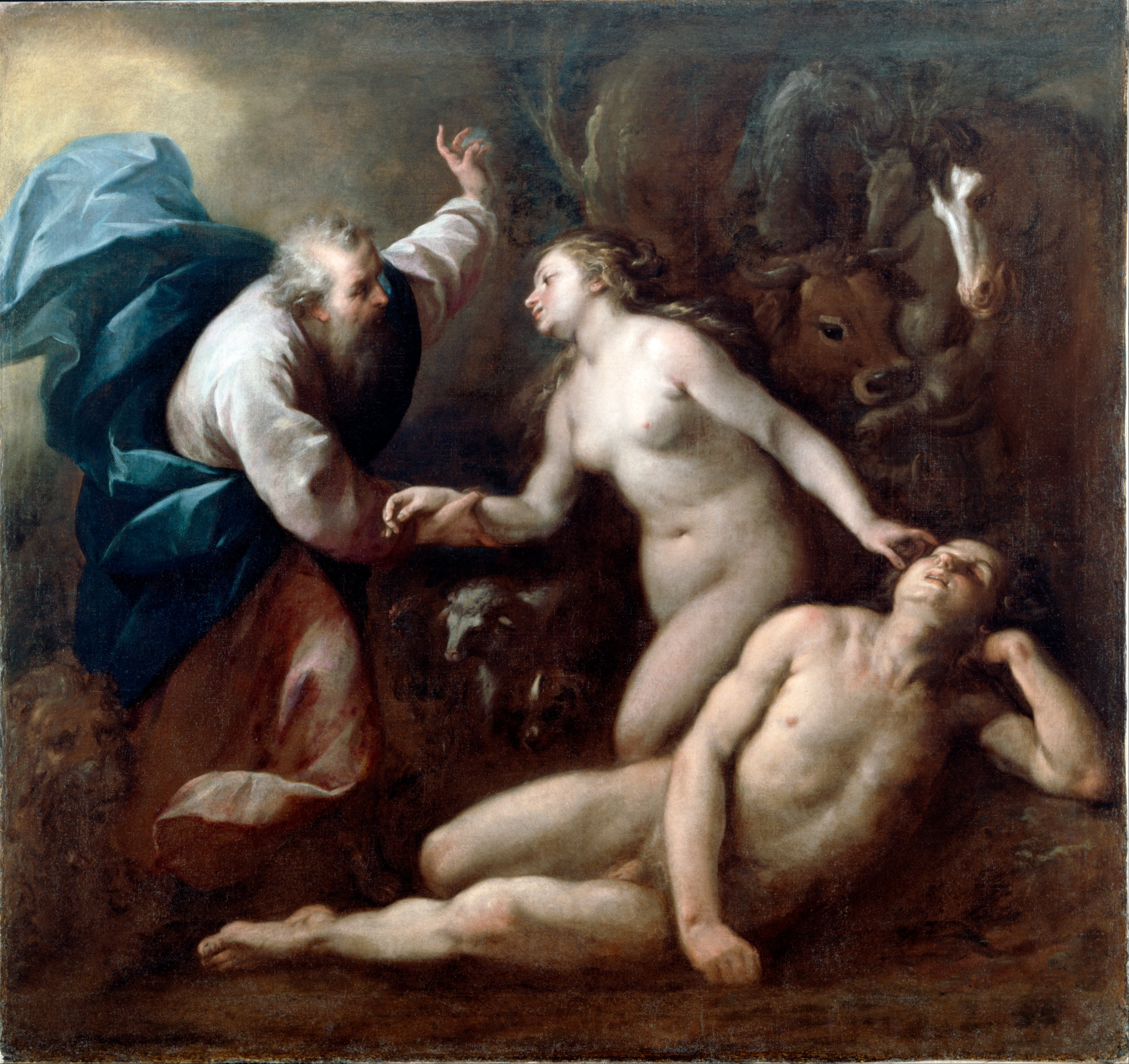
The Creation of Eve, Dulwich Picture Gallery, London

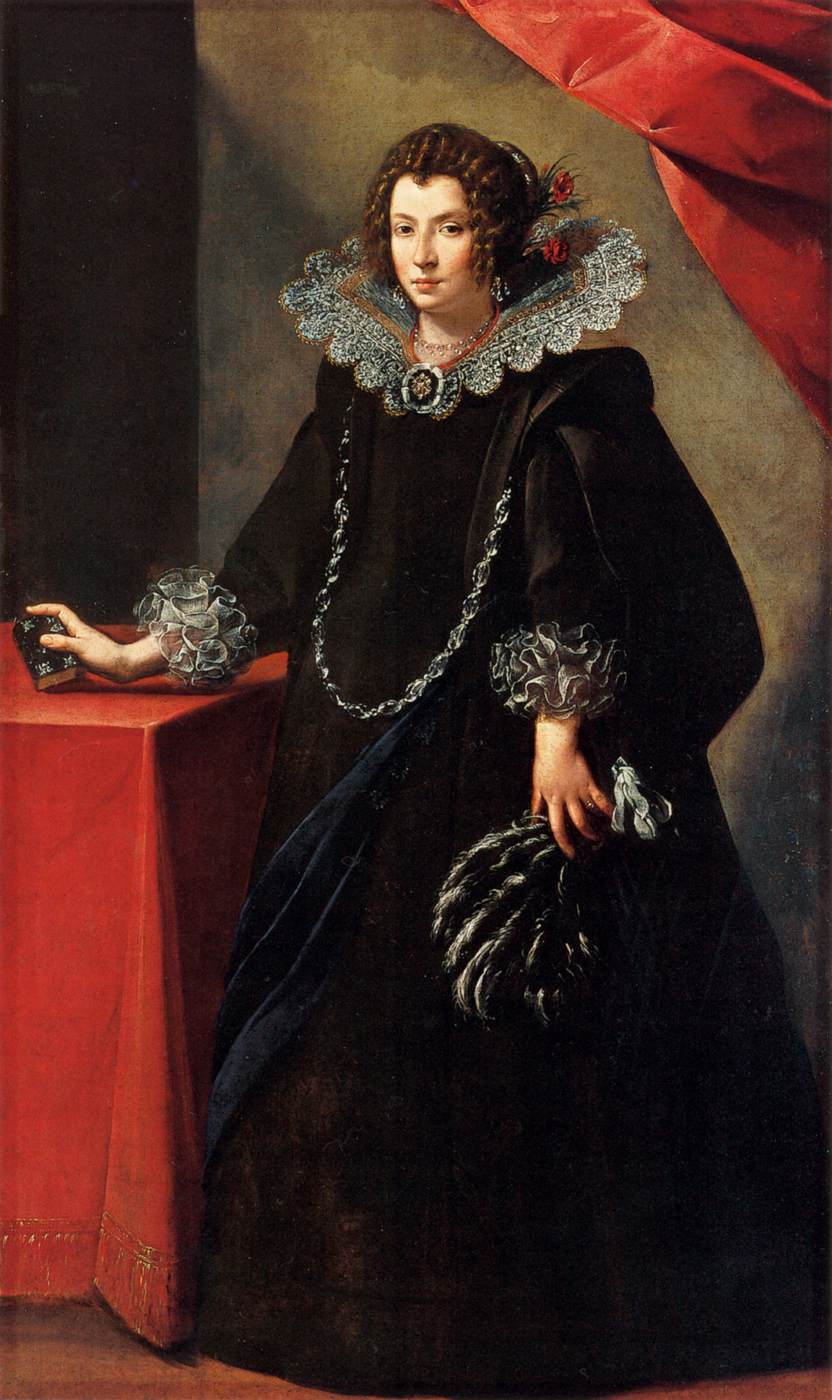
Portrait of a Lady, Bologna City Art Collections

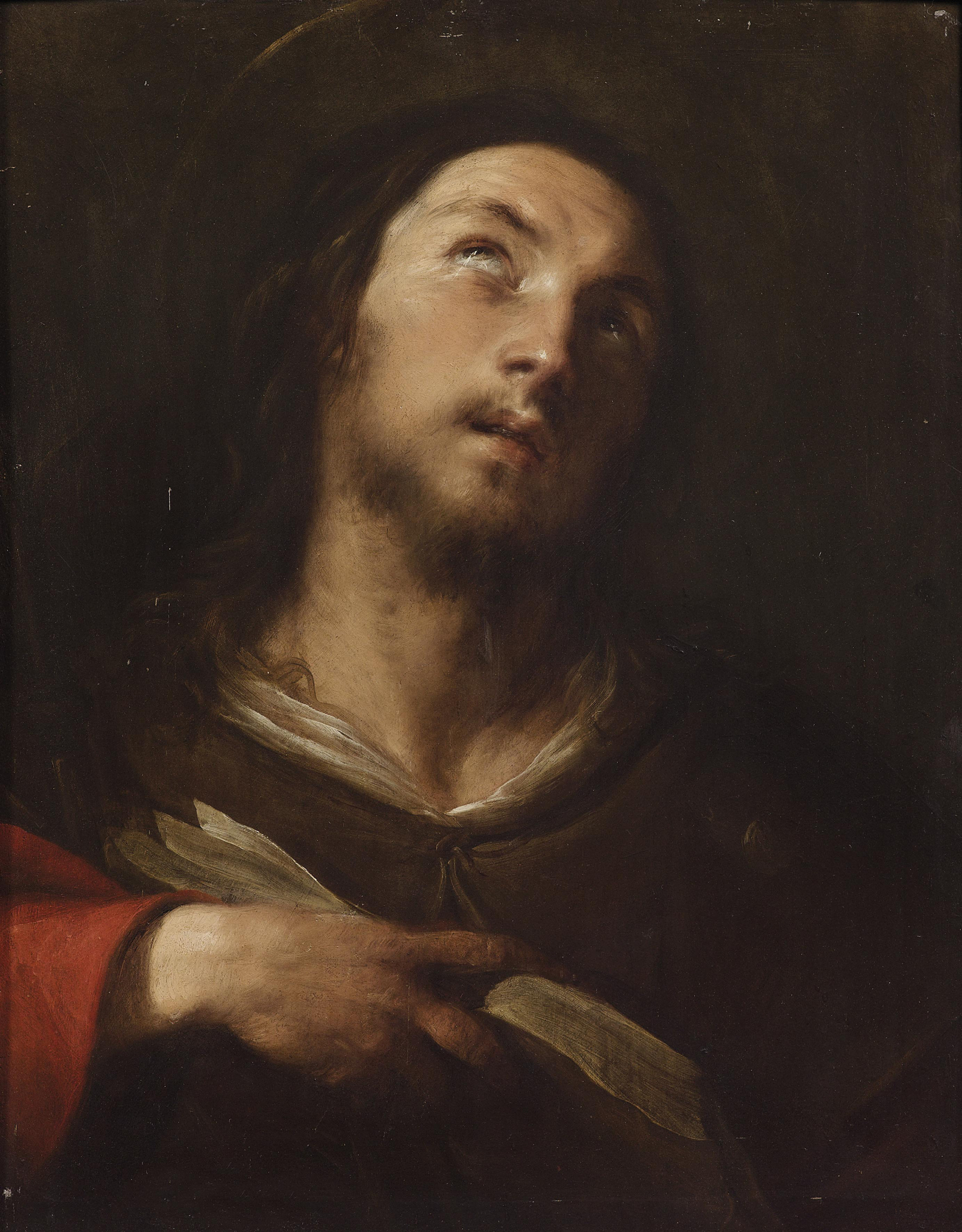
St. James, priv. col.

== Bibliography ==
- Giorgi, Giovanni Antonio de (1836). Notizie sui Celebri Pittori e su altri Artisti Alessandrini (in Italian). Alessandria: Luigi Capriolo.
- Rosini, Giovanni (1847). Storia della pittura italiana esposta coi monumenti: Epoca quarta dai Caracci all'Appiani (in Italian). Vol. 7. Pisa: Presso Capurro. p. 179.
- Ruggeri, Ugo (1967). "Aggiunte a Carlo Francesco Nuvolone". Arte Lombarda. 12 (1): 67–72. JSTOR 43131706.
- Frangi, Francesco (2003). "Nuvolone, Carlo Francesco". Grove Art Online. Oxford University Press. doi:10.1093/oao/9781884446054.013.90000372273.
- Andrea Bayer, ed. (2004). Painters of reality: the legacy of Leonardo and Caravaggio in Lombardy. New York: The Metropolitan Museum of Art.
- Frangi, Francesco (2013). "NUVOLONE, Carlo Francesco". Enciclopedia on line (in Italian). Vol. 79: Nursio–Ottolini Visconti. Rome: Istituto dell'Enciclopedia Italiana. ISBN 978-88-12-00032-6.
