= Filippo Abbiati =

Italian painter (1640–1715)

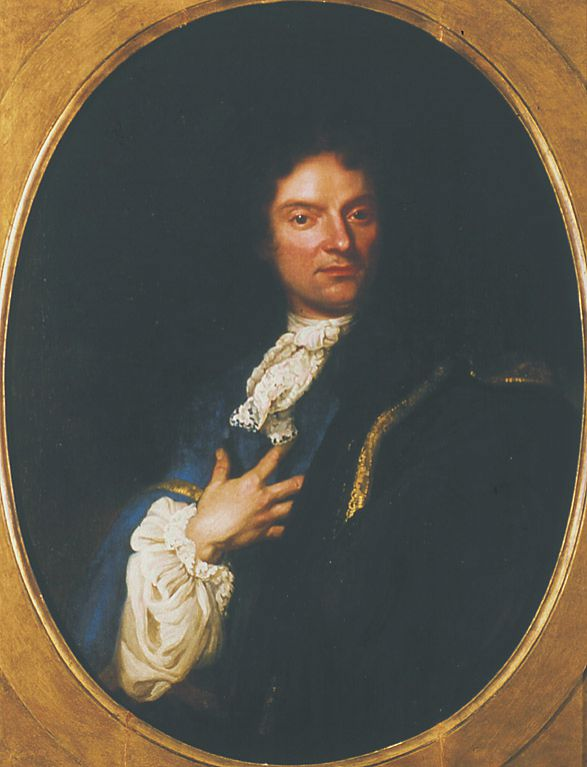
- Self-portrait
- Born: 1640; Milan, Duchy of Milan
- Died: 1715 (aged 74–75); Milan, Duchy of Milan
- Education: Carlo Francesco Nuvolone
- Known for: Painting
- Movement: Baroque

Filippo Abbiati (1640–1715) was an Italian painter of the early-Baroque period, active in Lombardy and Turin, together with Andrea Lanzani and Stefano Maria Legnani, he was a prominent mannerist painters from the School of Lombardy. Born in Milan, he was a pupil of the painter Antonio Busca. Alessandro Magnasco was one of his pupils along with Pietro Maggi and Giuseppe Rivola. Ticozzi claims he trained, along with Federigo Bianchi, with Carlo Francesco Nuvolone. Along with Bianchi, he painted the cupola of Sant'Alessandro Martire in Milan. Abbiati also painted a St. John preaching in the Wilderness for a church in Saronno.

== Biography ==
Filippo Abbiati was an apprentice of Carlo Francesco Nuvolone, of whom he resumed the fluid touch and taste for the spacious and luminous foundations, and then of Antonio Busca. He was mainly influenced by the early seventeenth-century painting of Lombardy, by the works of Cerano, Morazzone and Procaccini. Later, he got acquainted with the Roman Baroque up to the first manifestations of the Rococo. Being in contact with the Venetian painting of Federico Bencovich and Sebastiano Ricci he influenced his apprentices Pietro Maggi and Giuseppe Rivola in this direction. Alessandro Magnasco also belonged to his school.

Abbiati developed his copious production especially in Milan and around it but the information on his life is scarce. In 1671 he produced a canvas, that was lost, for the Milanese church of Santa Maria del Carmine and another, also no longer existing, for the Scuola di San Giovanni in Murano, which suggests his presence in Venice, while one of his trips to Rome before 1674 was hypothesized to explain the influence of Roman painting in his painting of Blessed Tolomeo, preserved in the Milanese church of San Vittore al Corpo.

For the Sanctuary of the Beata Vergine dei Miracoli in Saronno he painted the altarpiece of the Preaching of St. John the Baptist (1677), perhaps together with Luca Borromeo, and a David; in 1688 La caduta della manna (The Gathering of the Manna) was also painted there.

In 1680, three canvases were commissioned for the church of San Sebastiano, in Milan. His masterpieces are considered the frescoes on the counter-façade, in the choir and in the dome of the Milanese church of Sant'Alessandro. He executed them from 1683 to 1696 in collaboration with Federico Bianchi. Though it is not easy to distinguish the work of one artist from the other, some claim that only The Triumph of the Holy Trinity, in the dome, and The Scenes of the life of Saint Alexander, in the choir, are of his own hand. Around the same period, he painted The Council of Ephesus for the church of Santa Maria del Carmine and 31 paintings with scenes from the life of Saint Lawrence for the Cathedral of Novara.

In 1700 he received payments for his contribution to funeral ceremonies in honor of Emperor Charles II. Around that year he painted for the church of Sant'Antonio the scenes of The life of Sant'Andrea Avellino, Sant'Antonio Converts a Heretic, Saint Peter Martyr Unmasks a False Madonna and The Miracle of the Mule, the latter two currently preserved in the Diocesan Museum of Milan.

His activity in later years was not documented. Abbiati died in Milan in 1715.

== Works ==
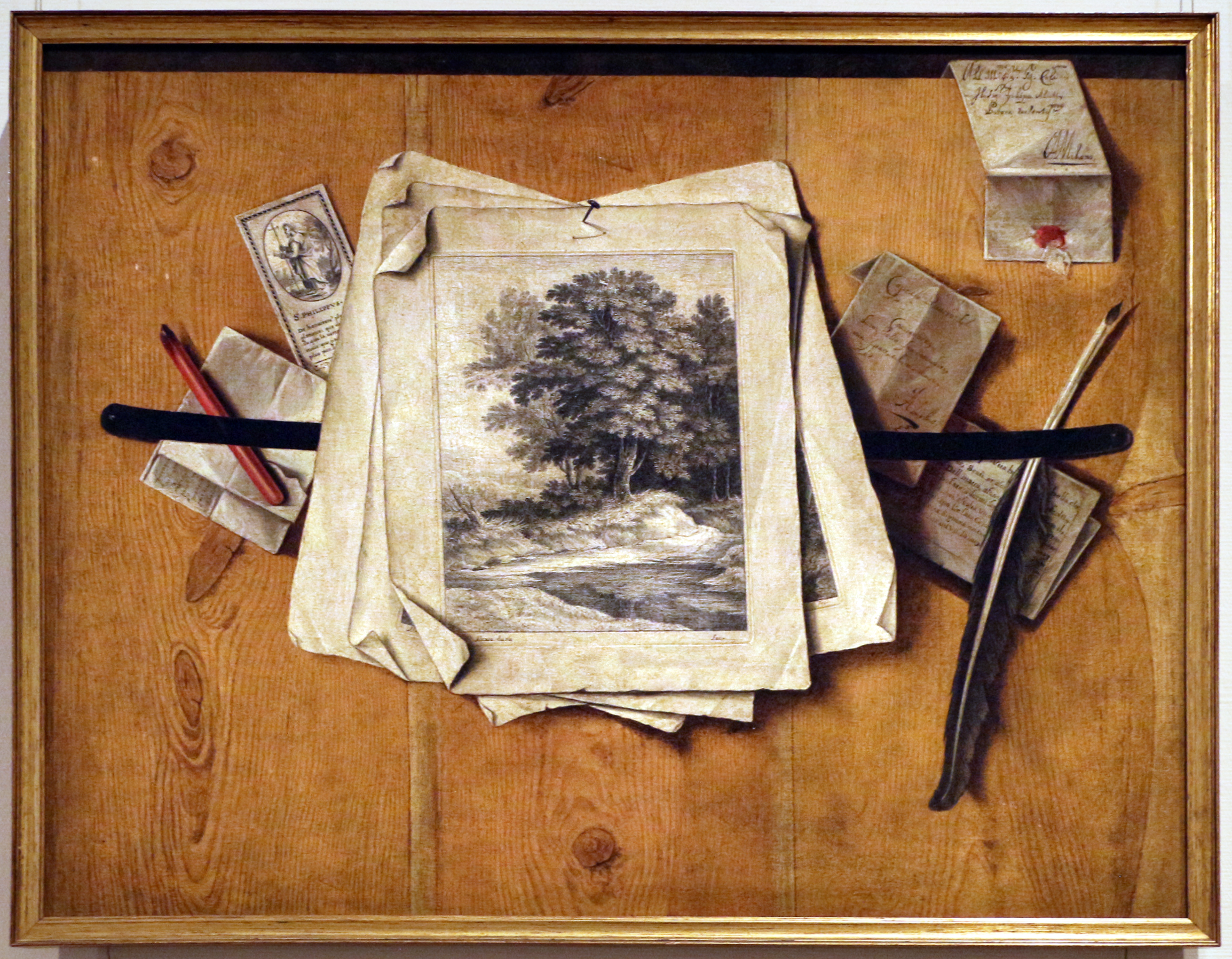
Trompe-l'oeil, 1690, Pinacoteca del Castello Sforzesco, Milan

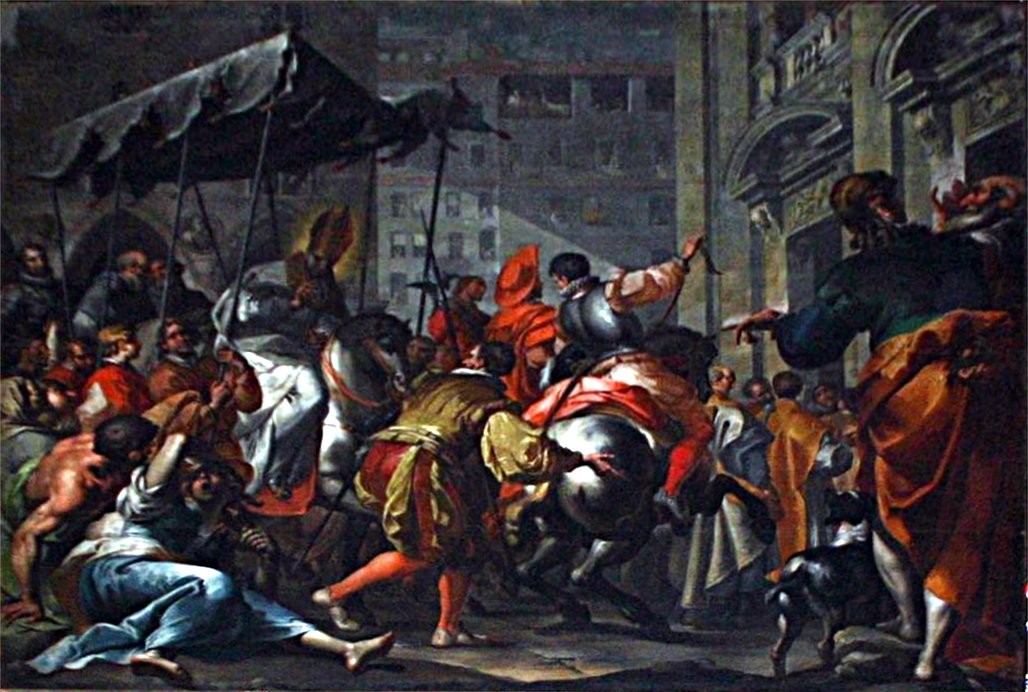
The Solemn Entrance of Charles Borromeo in Milan, from the Quadroni of St. Charles, Milan Cathedral

- The Solemn Entrance of Charles Borromeo in Milan (1670–80), from the Quadroni of St. Charles, Milan Cathedral
- Portrait of Filippo Pirogalli (around 1677), Milan, Ospedale Maggiore
- Birth of Mary (around 1680), Santa Maria dei Miracoli Basilica, Morbio Inferiore, Switzerland
- Apparition of the Virgin (1683–85), Calvet Museum, Avignon, oil on canvas, 55 × 66 cm
- Self-Portrait, Pinacoteca di Brera, Milan
- History of St Andrea of Avellino, Sant'Antonio Abate, Milan
- Apparition of Virgin to Pope Honorius III, Church of Santa Maria del Carmine, Pavia
- San Siro before the Pope, Pavia Cathedral
- David, Moses at Sant'Agostino, Pavia
- St John Preaching in the Wilderness, a church in Saronno

His other works are at the Pinacoteca Carrara in Bergamo and the Biblioteca Ambrosiana in Milan.
