= Quadroni of St. Charles =

Two cycles of paintings

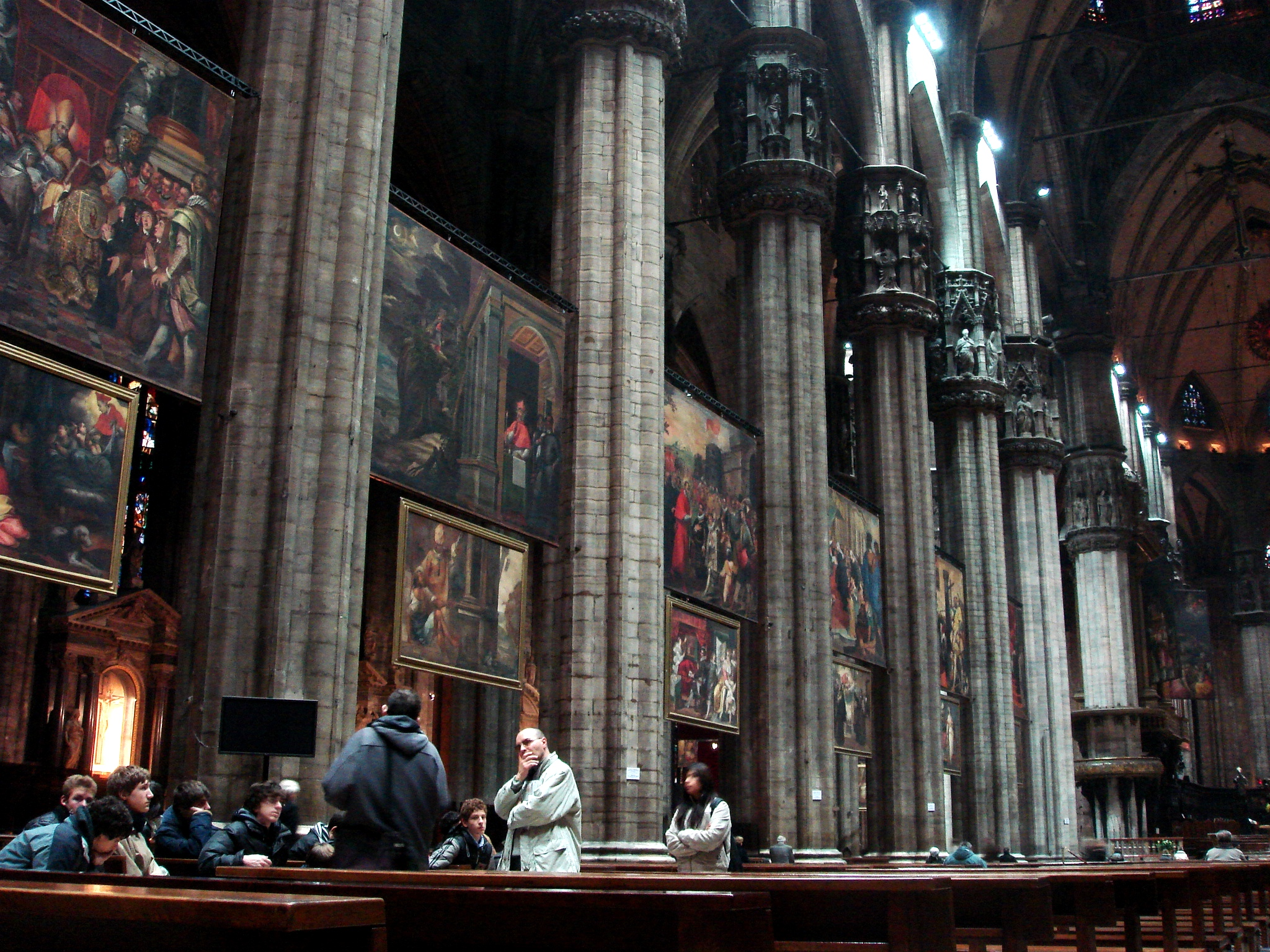
Quadroni in situ along the nave of the Cathedral of Milan

The Quadroni of St. Charles are two cycles of paintings depicting the life and miracles of St. Charles Borromeo, the first Saint of the Counter-Reformation. These very large paintings (quadroni), approximately five by six metres each, are displayed each November in the Milan Cathedral in honor of St. Charles' name day on November 4. They were also exhibited continuously from November 4, 1999 to November 4, 2000 in honor of the Catholic Jubilee celebrations.

The first cycle was begun in 1602, 26 years after Charles' death, and is the larger of the two. It is known as I fatti della vita del beato Carlo ("The Facts of the Life of Blessed Charles"). It consists of 28 paintings depicting his life, concentrating upon his tenure as Archbishop of Milan. Work on this cycle continued into the late 18th century. The first twenty large paintings, all tempera on canvas, were painted by Il Cerano (4 paintings), Giovanni Mauro della Rovere (Il Fiammenghino) (3), Il Duchino (7), Procaccini (1), Carlo Buzzi (2), Domenico Pellegrini (1), and Morazzone.

The second cycle, I miracoli di San Carlo ("The Miracles of St. Charles"), consists of 24 paintings of Charles' miraculous works and healings. These paintings are smaller than the first set, measuring about 2.4 by 4.4 metres. They were all painted between December 1609 and November 1, 1610, when St. Charles was canonized. These paintings were displayed together with the first cycle for the first time on November 4, 1610 in the Milan Cathedral; the paintings of his miracles could not be displayed until he had been declared a Saint.

== Gallery of selected works ==
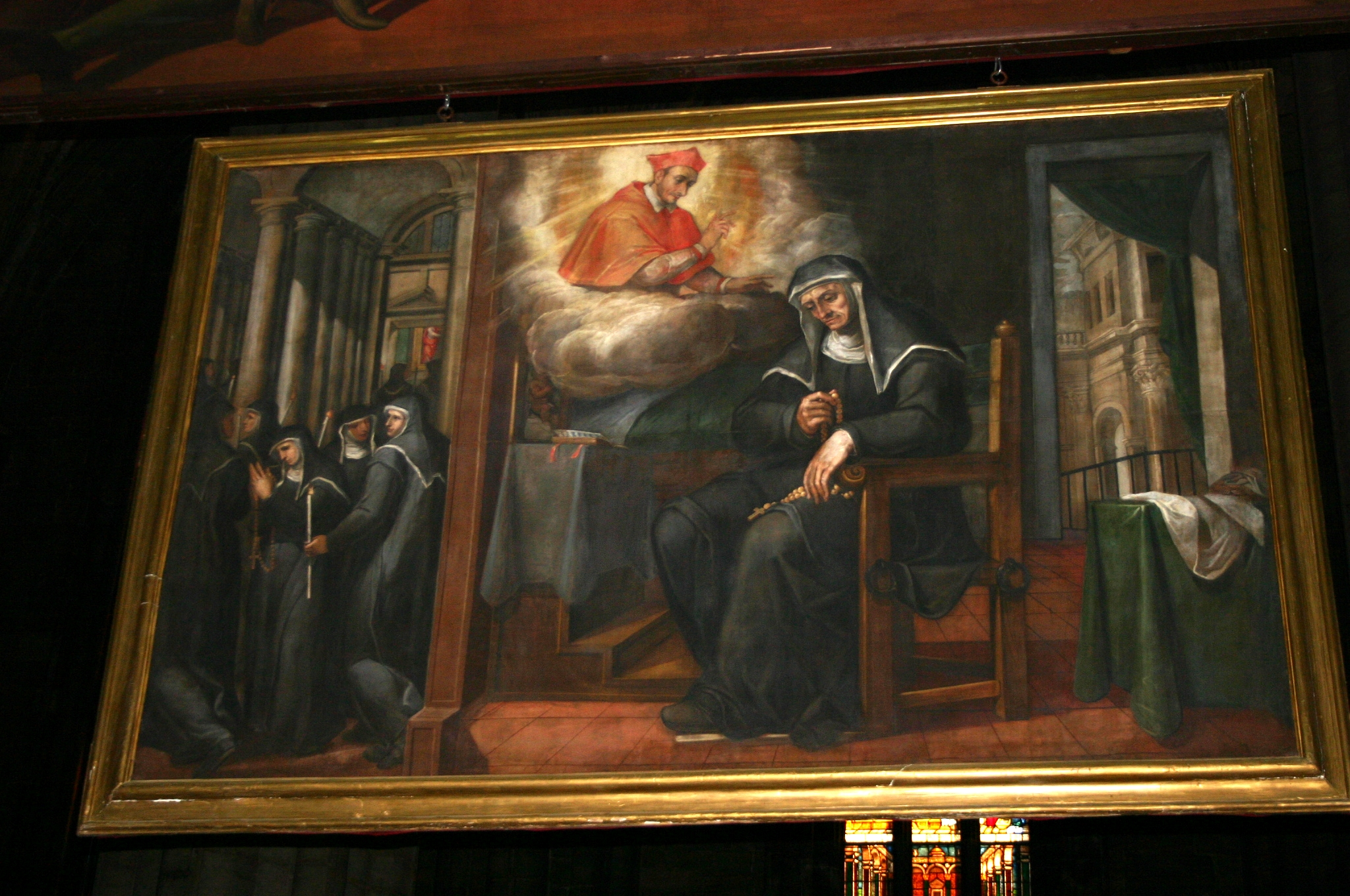
Miracle of suor Angela A. De Seni by Carlo Buzzi

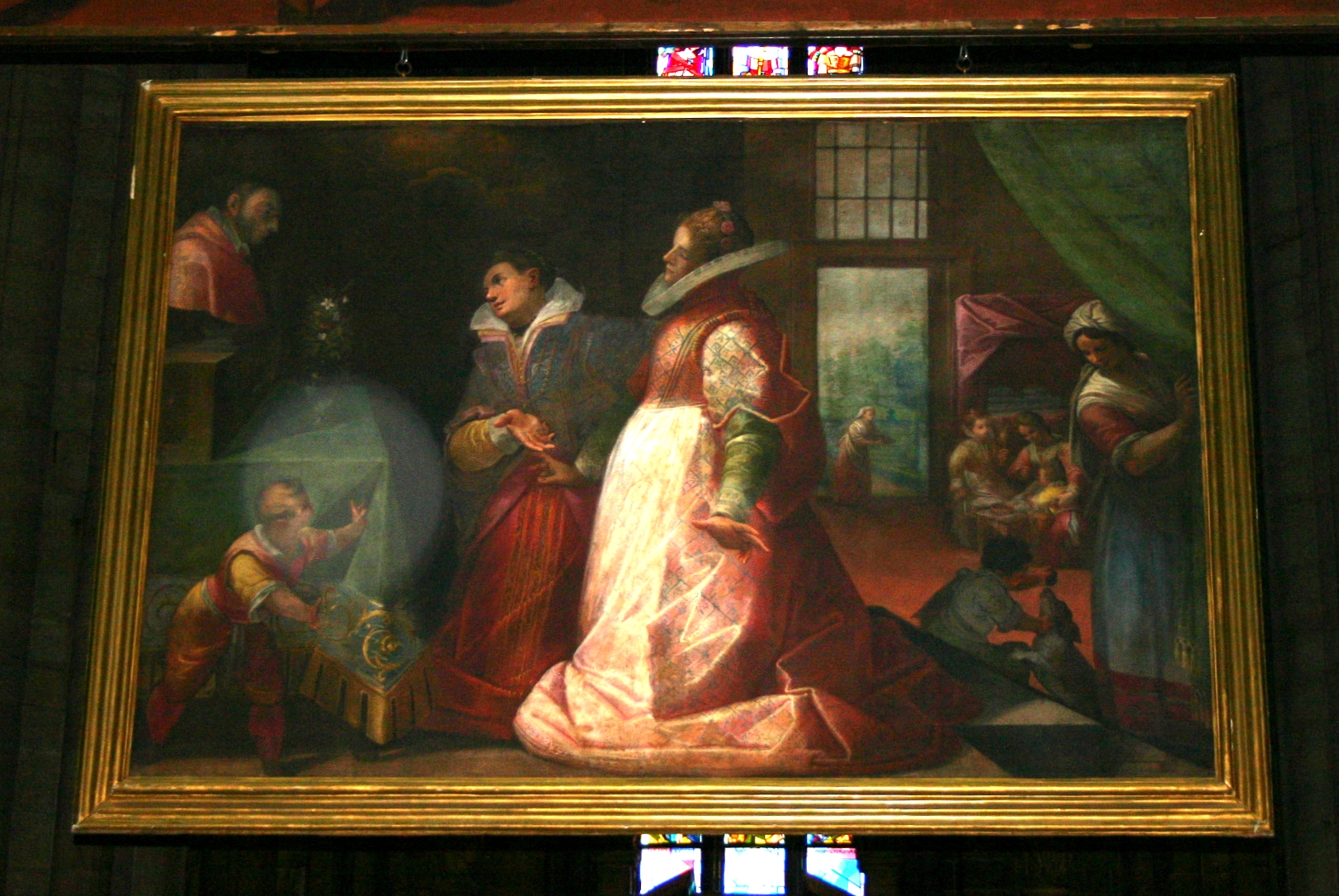
Miracle of Marina Ferraro by il Duchino

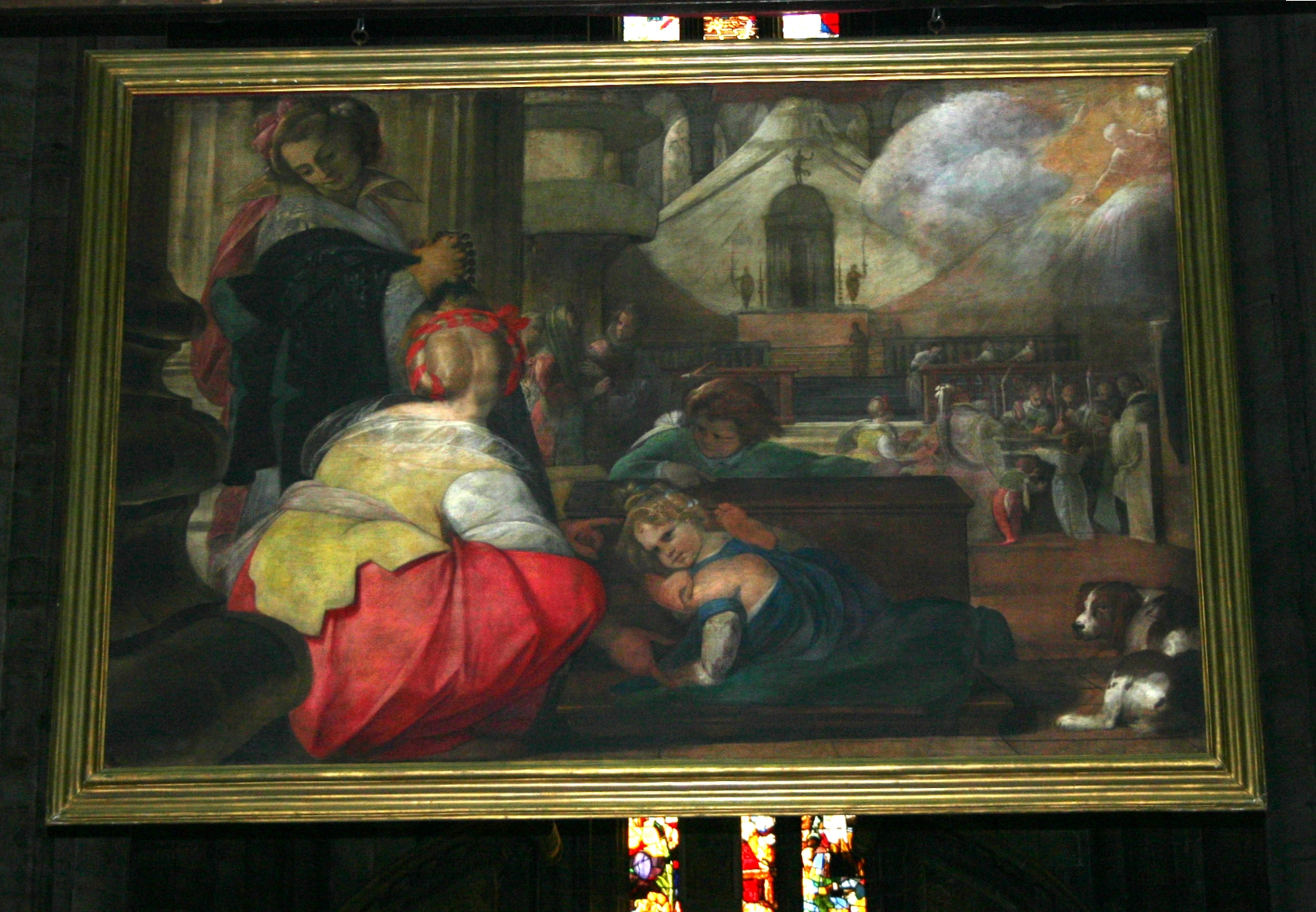
Miracle of Giovanna Marone by il Cerano

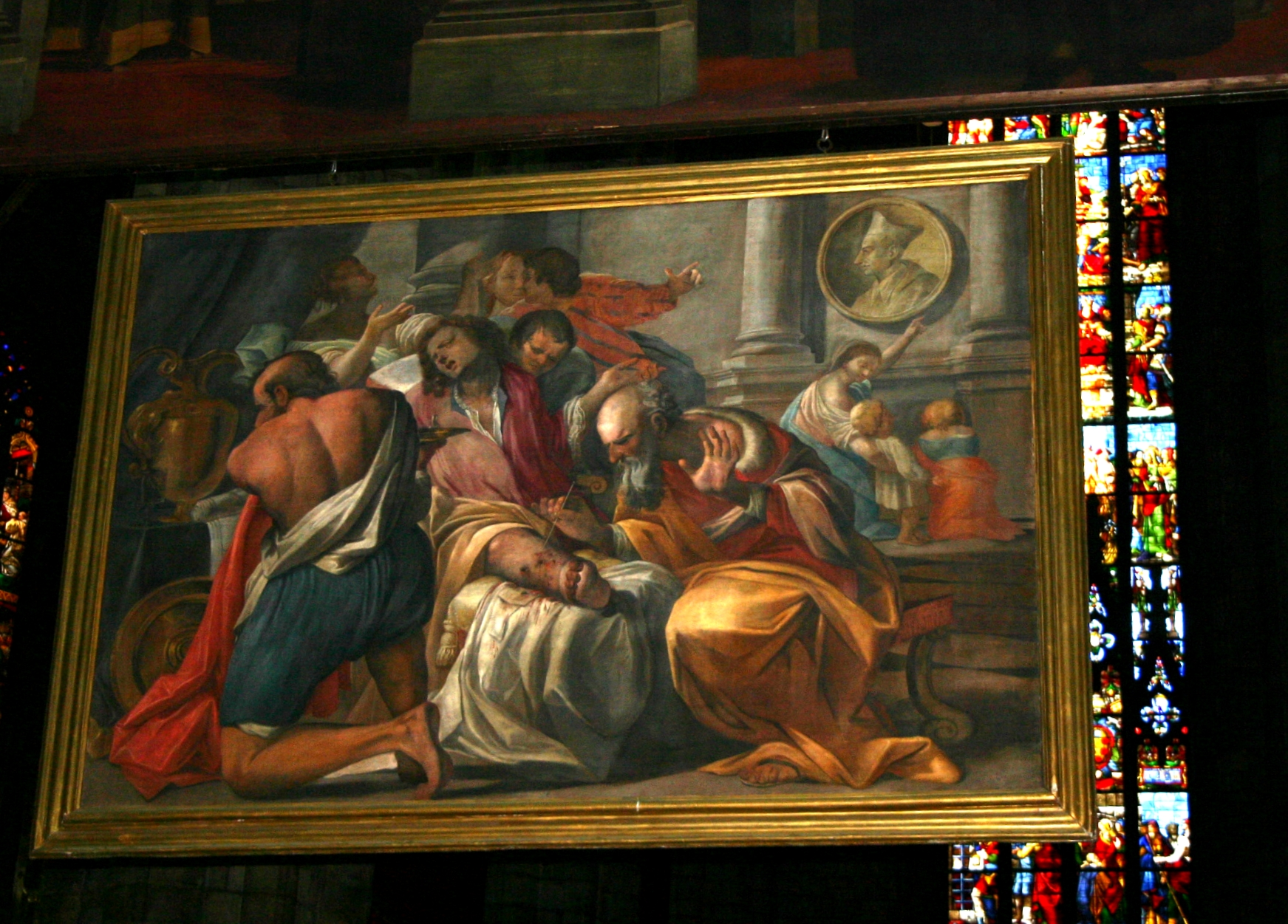
Miracle of the Gangrenous Leg, Anonymous

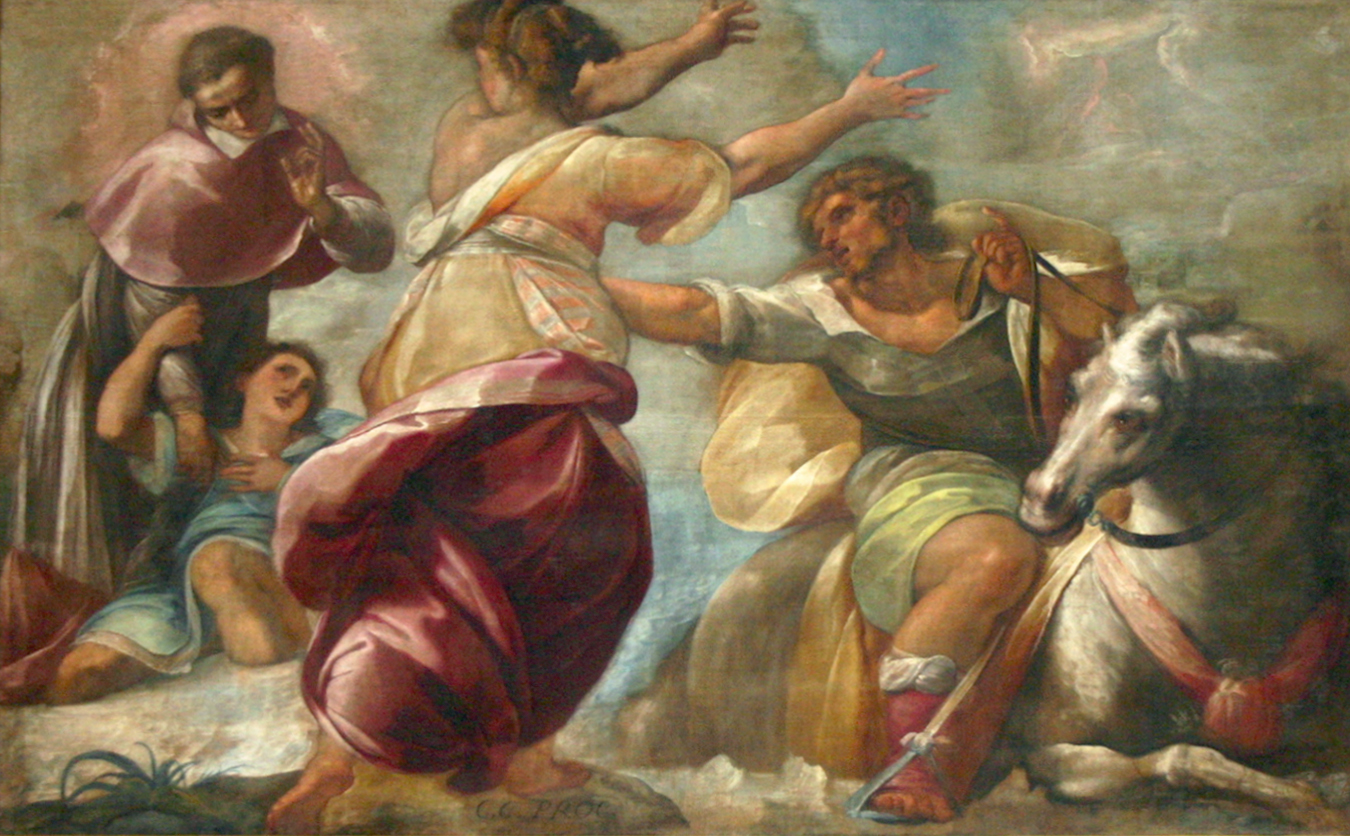
Miracle of young Giovanni Tirone by Procaccini

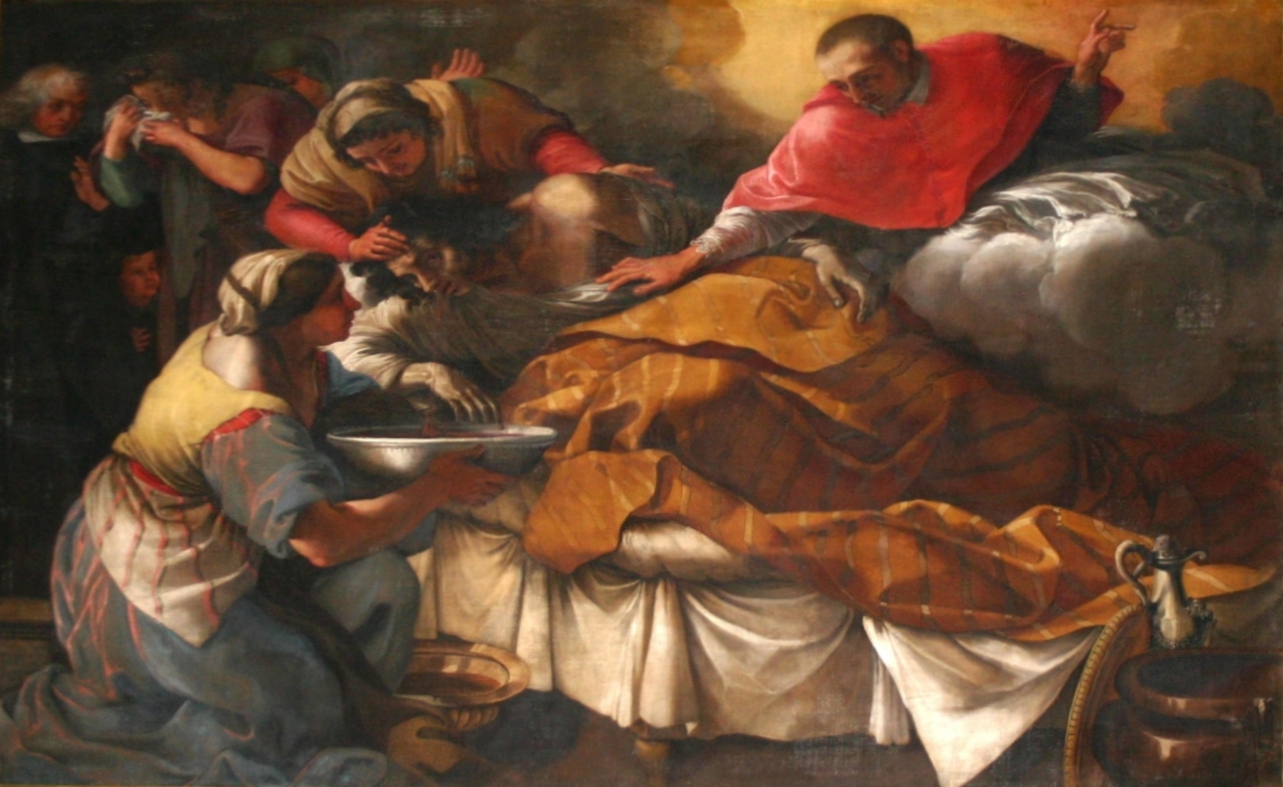
Miracle of Marco Spagnolo by Giorgio Bonola

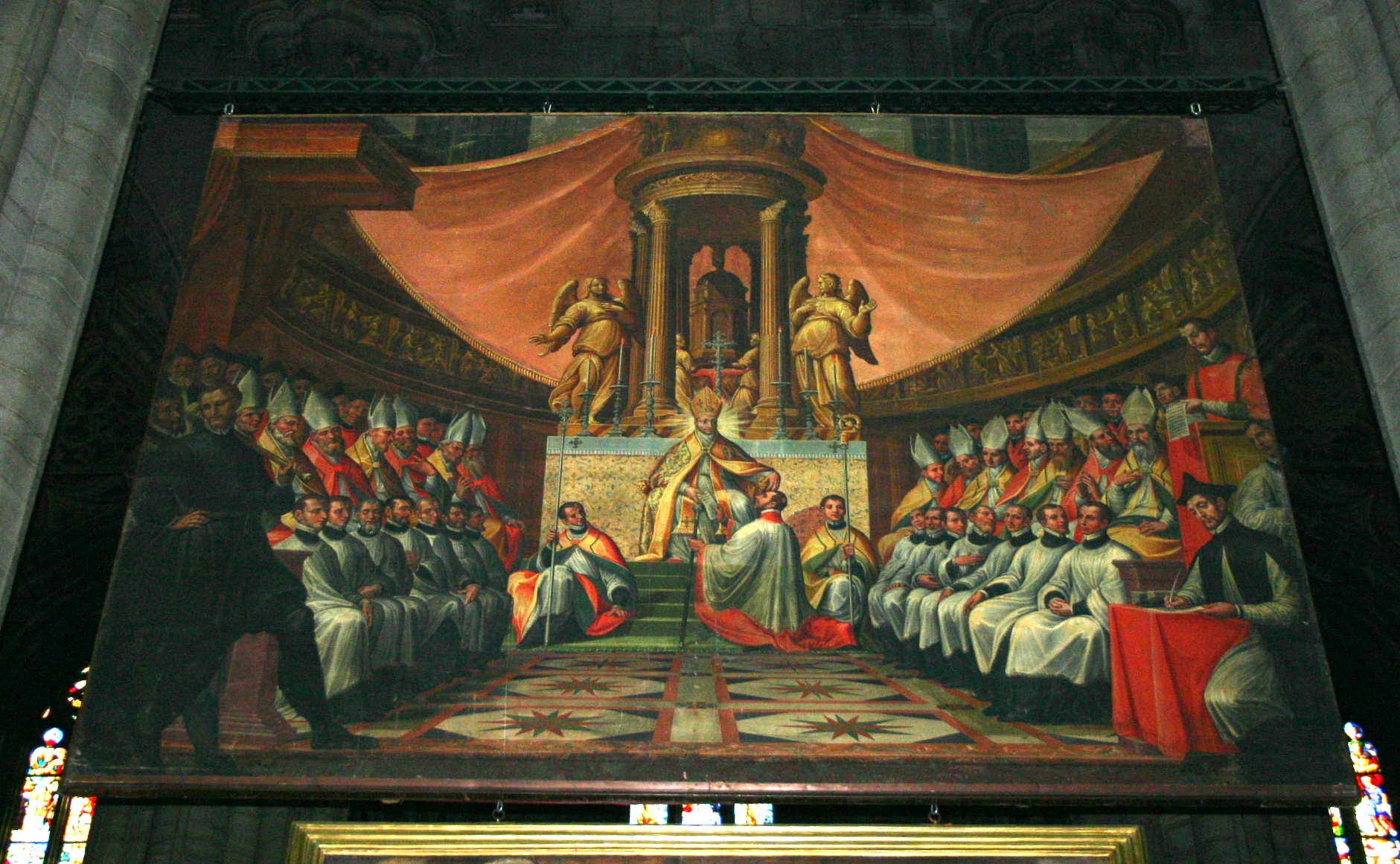
Carlo Borromeo celebrates Synod by il Fiammenghino

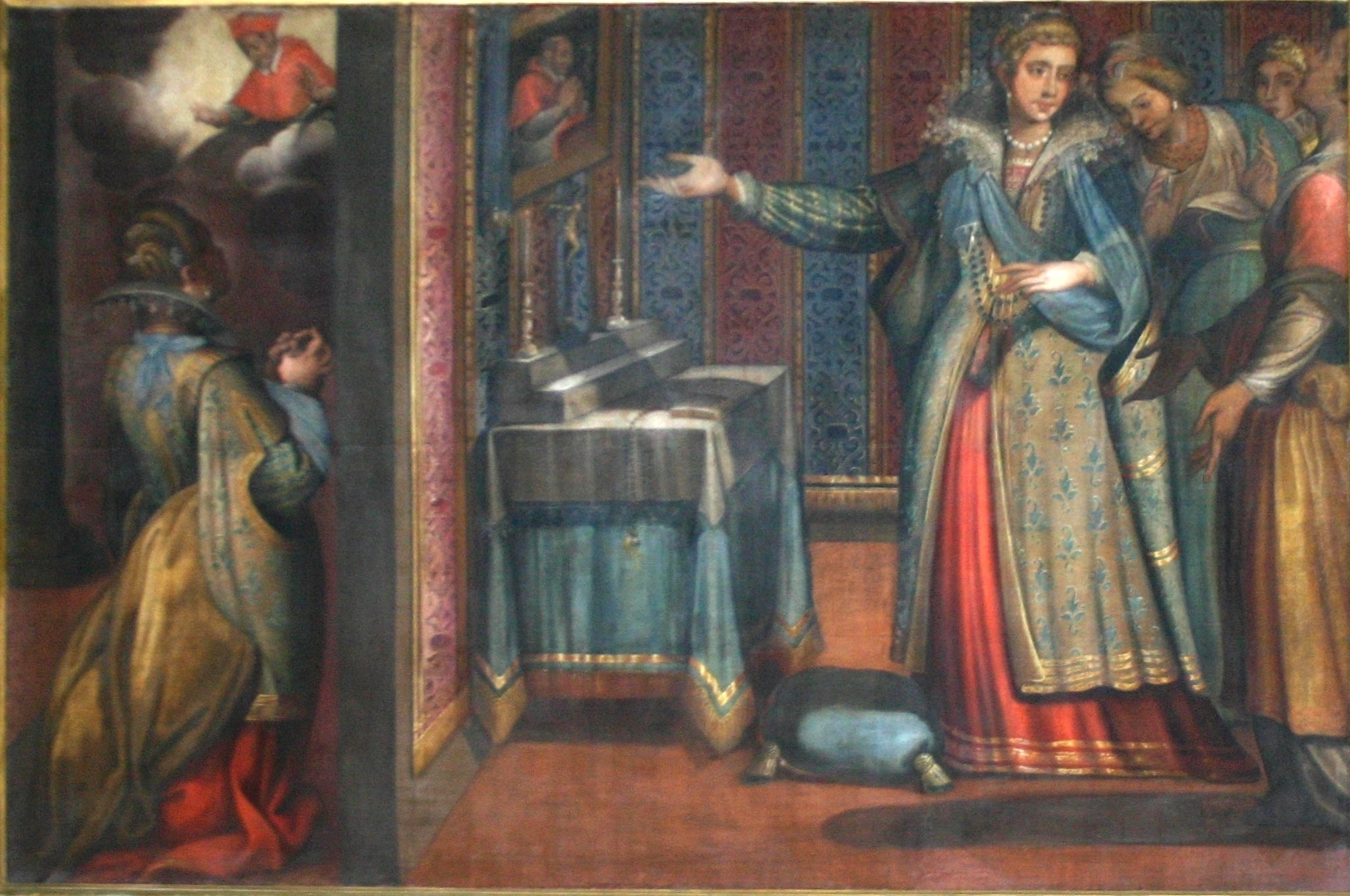
Miracle of Anna Miskowiki Branika by Paolo Camillo Landriani, known as il Duchino

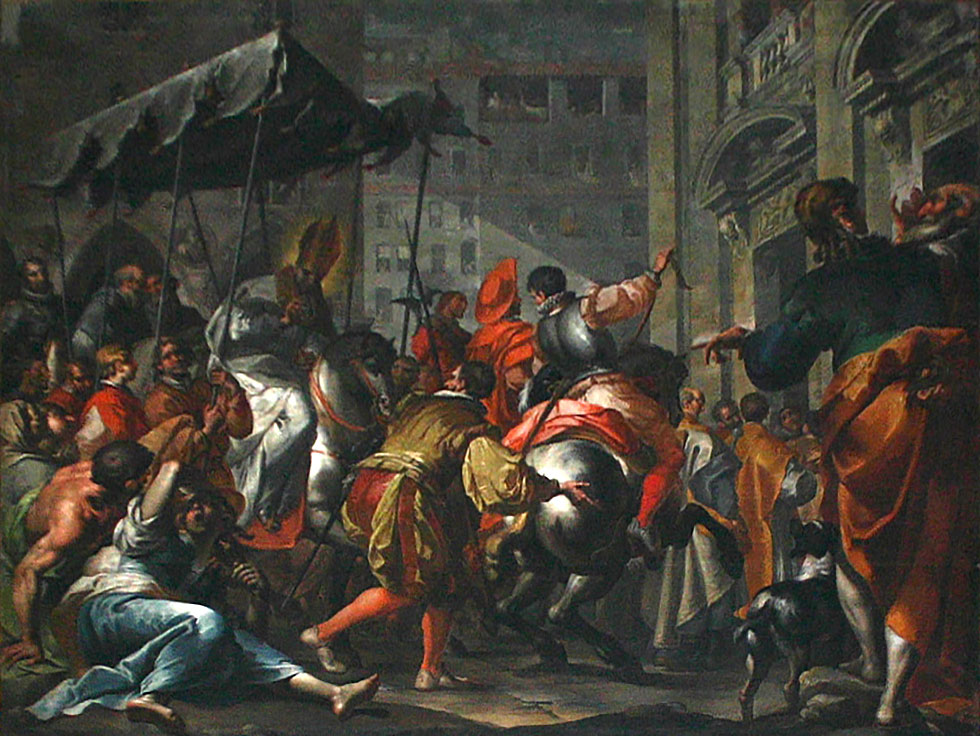
Carlo Borromeo enters Milan by Filippo Abbiati

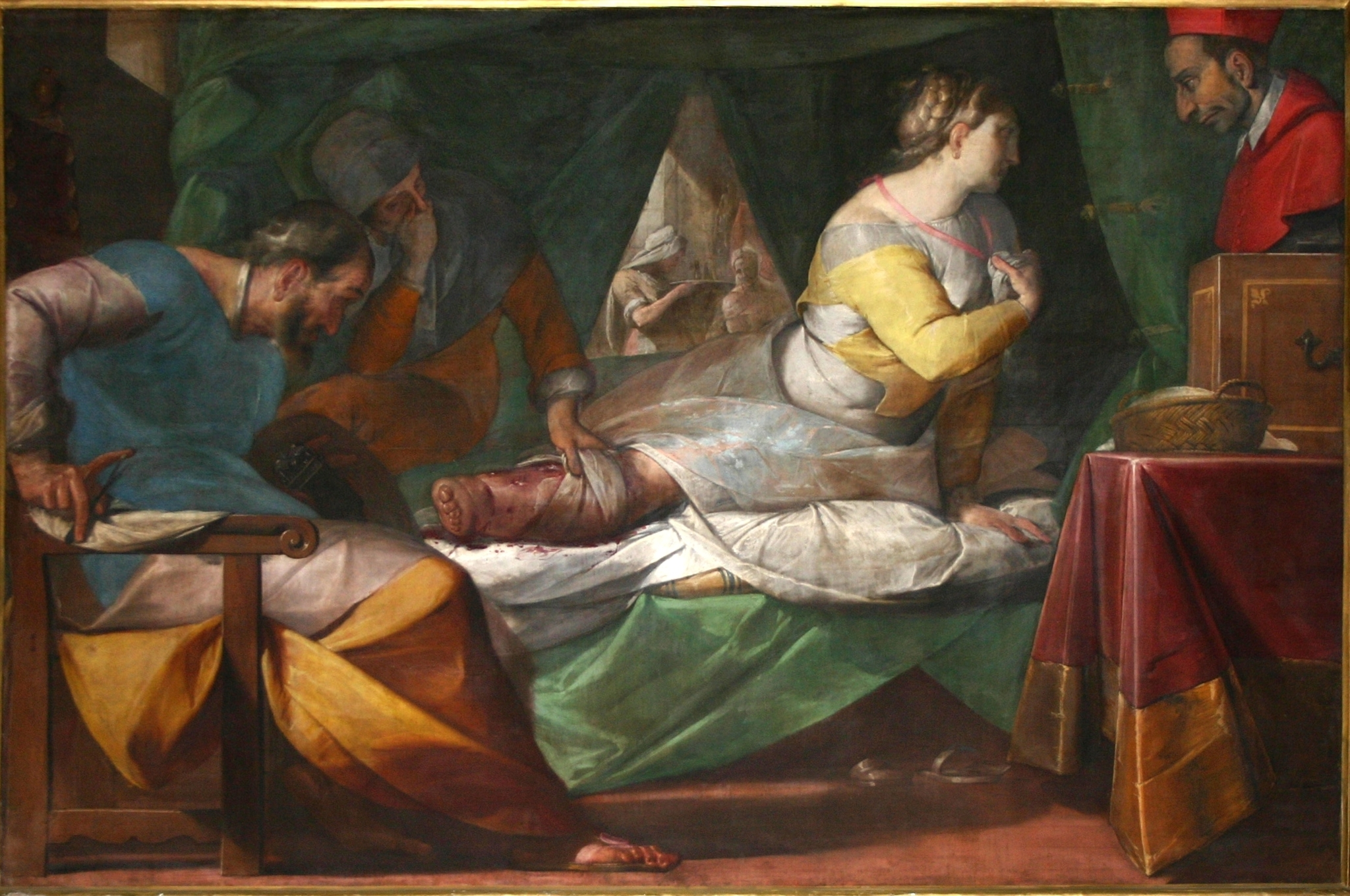
Miracle of Aurelia Degli Angeli
