= Paolo Camillo Landriani =

Italian painter

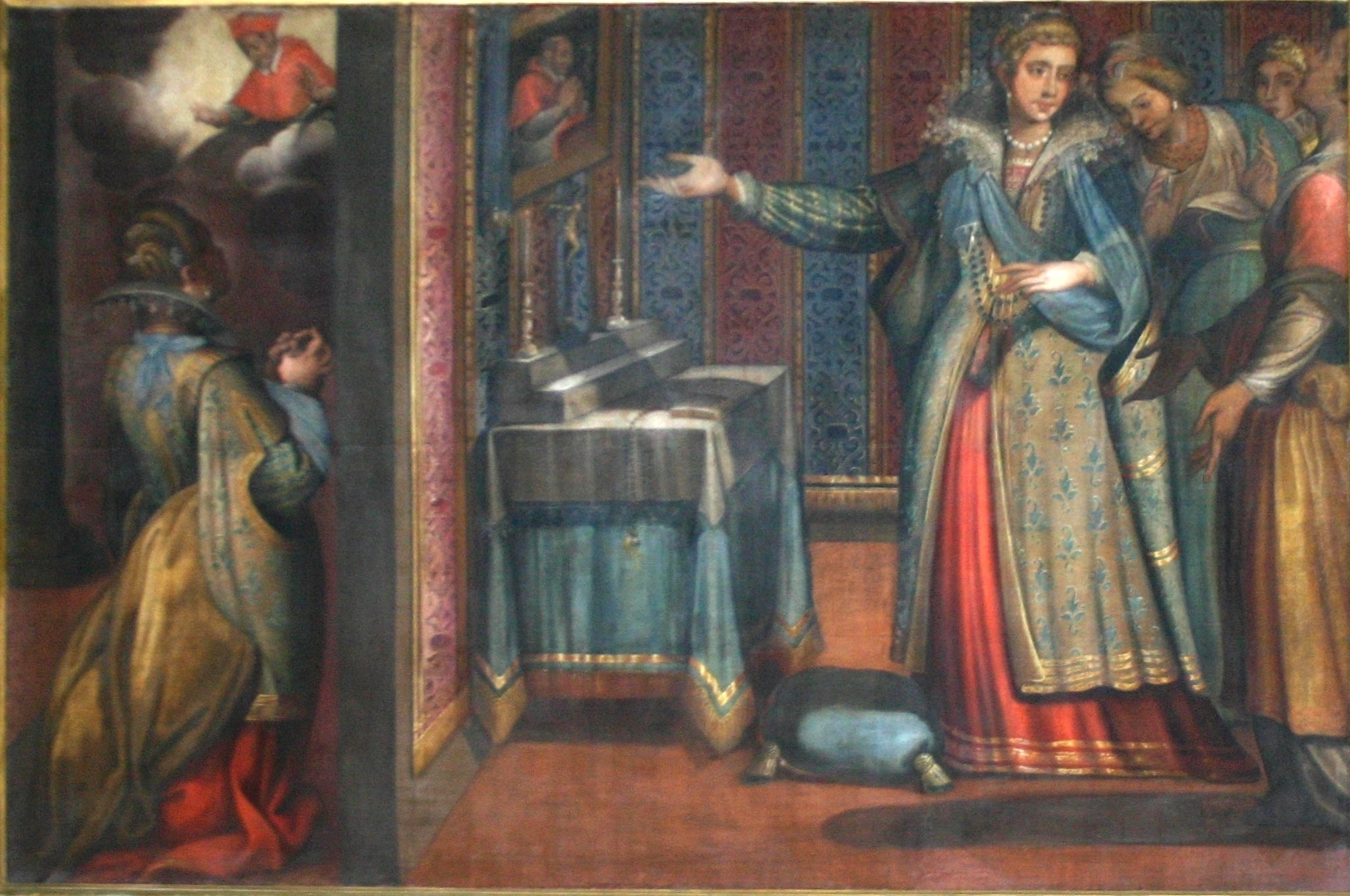
Paolo Camillo Landriani, Miracle of Anna Miskowiki, one of the Quadroni of St. Charles of the Milan Cathedral, 1610

Paolo Camillo Landriani (c. 1560–1618) was an Italian painter of the late-Renaissance period, active mainly in Milan. He was known also as il Duchino for his habit of living in finery.

== Biography ==
He was a pupil of the painter Ottavio Semini from Genoa. His works in Milan include a Nativity for the Basilica of Sant'Ambrogio and several paintings in the Cathedral of Milan, including the decorations on the "Nivola", a sort of lift used in the cathedral in a yearly celebration of the "Holy Nail" relic. He also painted for Santa Maria della Passione. He died in Milan.
