= Giuseppe Zanata =

Italian painter (1643–1720)

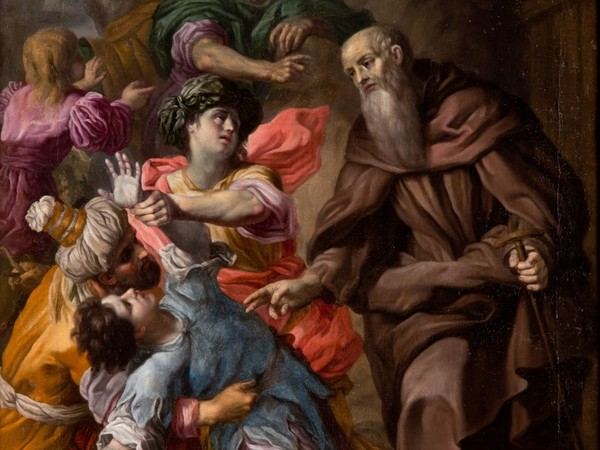
San Antonio Abate resuscita un giovane assassinato

Giuseppe Zanata (1643–1720) was an Italian painter of the Baroque period, active mainly in Lombardy.

He was born in Miasino in the Province of Novara, in Piedmont. He was active in Milan and in the Riviera del Cusio. In the Basilica di San Giulio in Orta San Giulio, he painted a canvas of Visit of the Praetor Audenzio to San Giulio. He trained with Carlo Francesco Nuvolone.
