= Panfilo Nuvolone =

Italian painter (1581–1651)

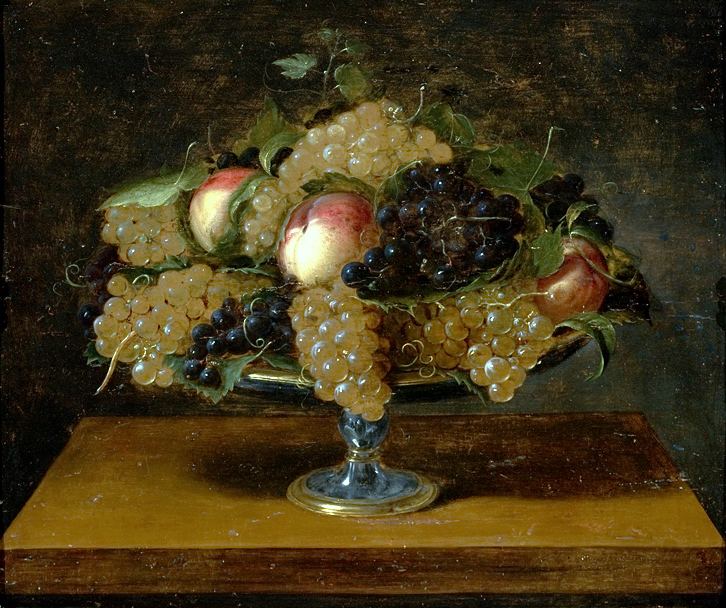
Still-life (1620). Painting by Panfilo Nuvolone (São Paulo Museum of Art, São Paulo).

Panfilo Nuvolone (1581–1651) was an Italian painter of the Mannerist period, who painted both religious subjects and still lifes, active in Cremona and Mantua.

Born to a Mantuan gentleman, he was the father of a family of Cremonese painters. In that town, he apprenticed with Giovanni Battista Trotti (known as il Malosso). Afterwards he moved to Milan, where fresco church ceilings, and painted altarpieces and still lifes.

One of his few documented still lifes depict a bowl of peaches, and recalls the near-contemporary paintings of fruit bowls in Milan, including the 1594–98 painting in the Ambrosiana by Caravaggio and similarly themed paintings by Fede Galizia. His son, Carlo Francesco Nuvolone, also a prominent in painter in Lombardy. Panfilo's younger son Giuseppe Nuvolone also a painter. Giuseppe's son Carlo was a mediocre quadratura specialist active mainly around Cremona.

== Sources ==
- Coddè, Segretario dell Belle Arti in Mantova, Dottore Pasquale (1837). Aumentate e scritte Dottore Fisico, Luigi Coddè (ed.). Memorie Biografiche, poste in forma di Dizionario die Pittori, Scultori, Architetti, ed Incisori Mantovani. Mantua: Presso i Fratelli Negretti. pp. 120–123.
- Grove Encyclopedia entry
- ‘’Cain and Abel’’
