= Procaccini =

Procaccini is the name of a prominent family of artists from the Renaissance and Baroque periods, active mainly in Bologna and Milan. They include:

- Ercole Procaccini the Elder (1520 – after 1591), father of Camillo, Giulio Cesare, and Carlo Antonio
- Camillo Procaccini (1551–1629), son of Ercole
- Carlo Antonio Procaccini (born 1555), son of Ercole the Elder and father of Ercole the Younger
- Giulio Cesare Procaccini (1574–1625), son of Ercole
- Ercole Procaccini the Younger (1605–1675), son of Carlo Antonio
- Andrea Procaccini (1671–1734)
