= Ercole Procaccini the Younger =

Italian painter

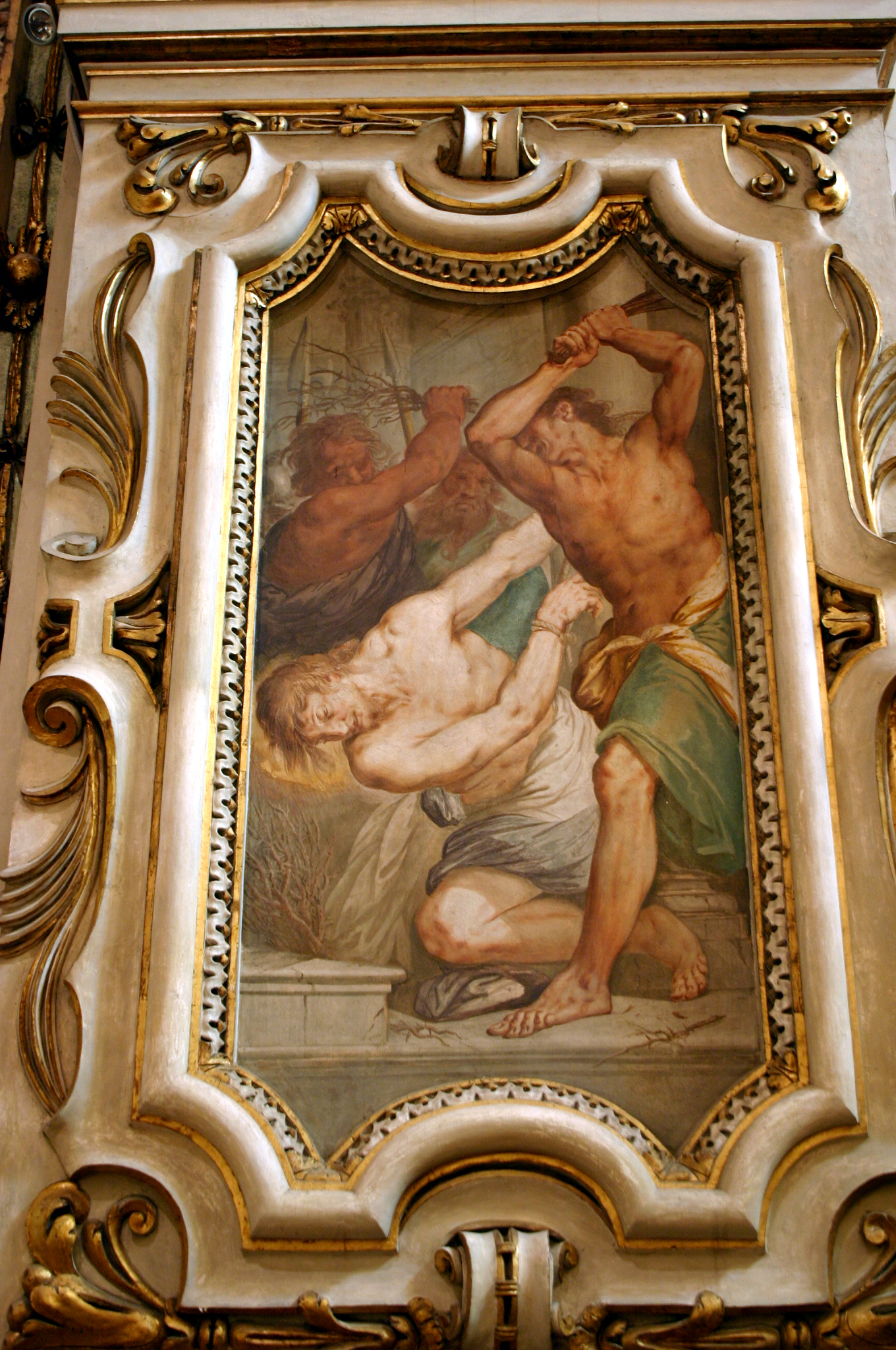
Ercole Procaccini il Giovane, Flogging of Christ, Milan, San Marco.

Ercole Procaccini il Giovane (the Younger) (c. 6 August 1605 – 14 November 1675 or 2 March 1680) was an Italian painter of the Baroque period.

Born to a family of painters in Milan, he initially apprenticed with his father, painter Carlantonio Procaccini. In 1621 he was enrolled in the first session of the Accademia Ambrosiana. His uncles, Camillo and Giulio Cesare Procaccini, were also painters. His grandfather was Ercole Procaccini the Elder.

He was trained with his uncle Giulio Cesare Procaccini in the city. He painted an altarpiece of the Assumption of the Virgin for the church of Santa Maria Maggiore at Bergamo. On the death of Giulio Cesare, he became the director of the academy established by the Procaccini.
