= Santa Maria del Suffragio, Piacenza =

Chapel in Piacenza, Italy

Santa Maria del Suffragio is a Neoclassic style, Roman Catholic chapel in the main cemetery of Piacenza, Italy. It was completed in 1826, with a Greek cross layout and a sober portico, by Lotario Tomba. The interior dome and pendentives were frescoed in 1936 by the painter Luciano Ricchetti. It houses an Immaculate Conception with Saints Francis and Anthony by Camillo Procaccini.
