= Mystic Marriage of Saint Catherine (Procaccini) =

Painting by Giulio Cesare Procaccini

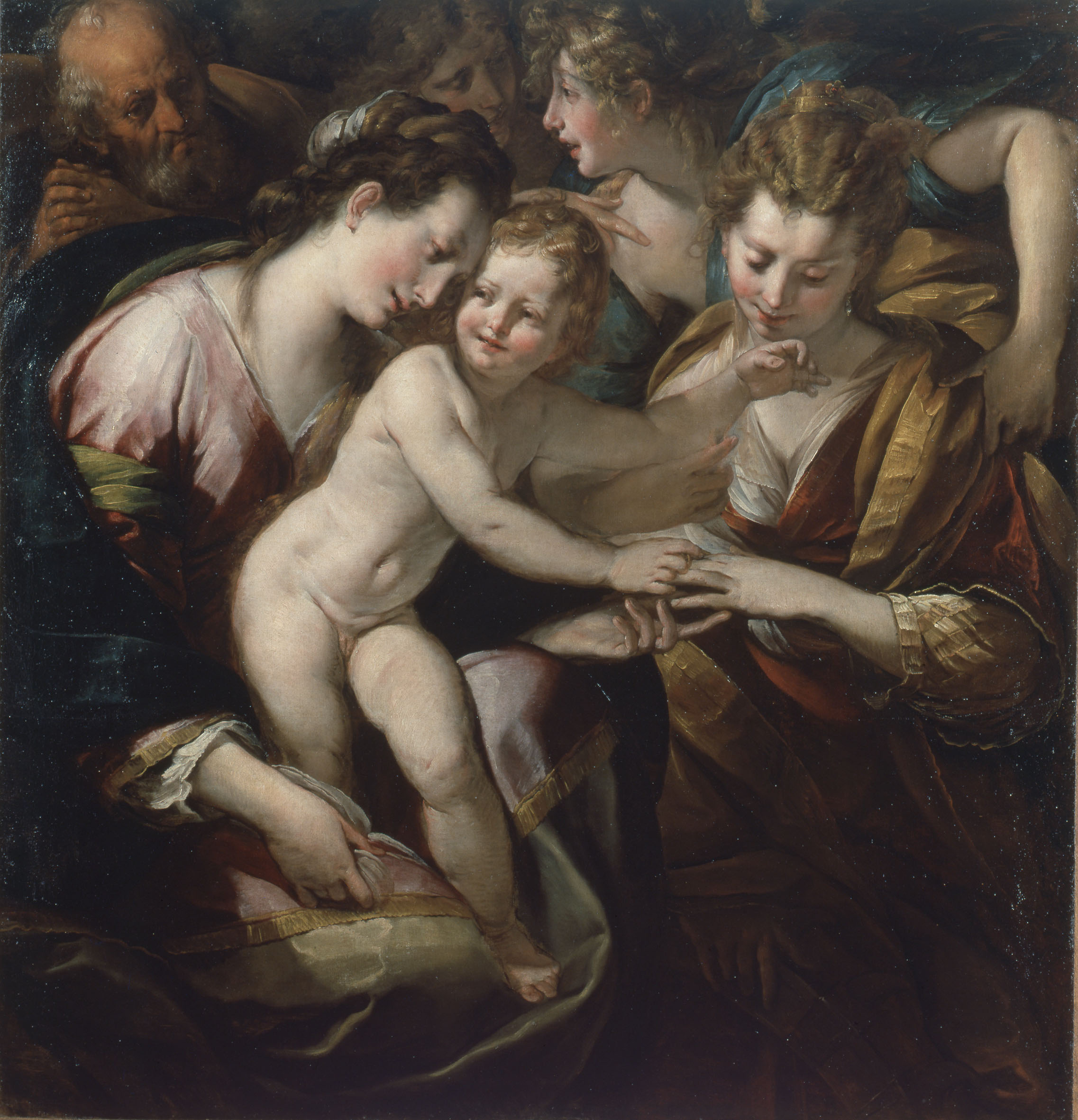
Mystic Marriage of Saint Catherine (c. 1616-1620)

Mystic Marriage of Saint Catherine is a c.1616-1620 oil on canvas painting by Giulio Cesare Procaccini, now in the Pinacoteca di Brera in Milan. It is one of the artist's last works, influenced by Correggio, Titian's allegories and Leonardo da Vinci's The Virgin and Child with Saint Anne (Louvre).

Its early history is unclear, though it may originally have been painted for Scipione Toso, a Milanese nobleman and important art collector. It is recorded in the collections of cardinal Cesare Monti, by whom it was left to the arch-episcopal collection. It was then requisitioned by viceroy Eugenio Beauharnais to be exhibited at the Accademia di Brera.

== Bibliography ==
- (in Italian) Coppa S., Strada P.,Seicento lombardo a Brera. Capolavori e riscoperte, Skira, 2013.
- (in Italian) Mina Gregori (editor), Pittura a Milano dal seicento al neoclassicismo, Cariplo, Milano, 1999.
- (in Italian) Brera. La Pinacoteca e i suoi capolavori, S. Bandera (editor), Skira, Milano 2009.
- (in Italian) Carlo Ludovico Ragghianti (editor),Pinacoteca di Brera, Arnoldo Mondadori, Milano, 1970
