= Santa Maria di Canepanova =

Church building in Pavia, Italy

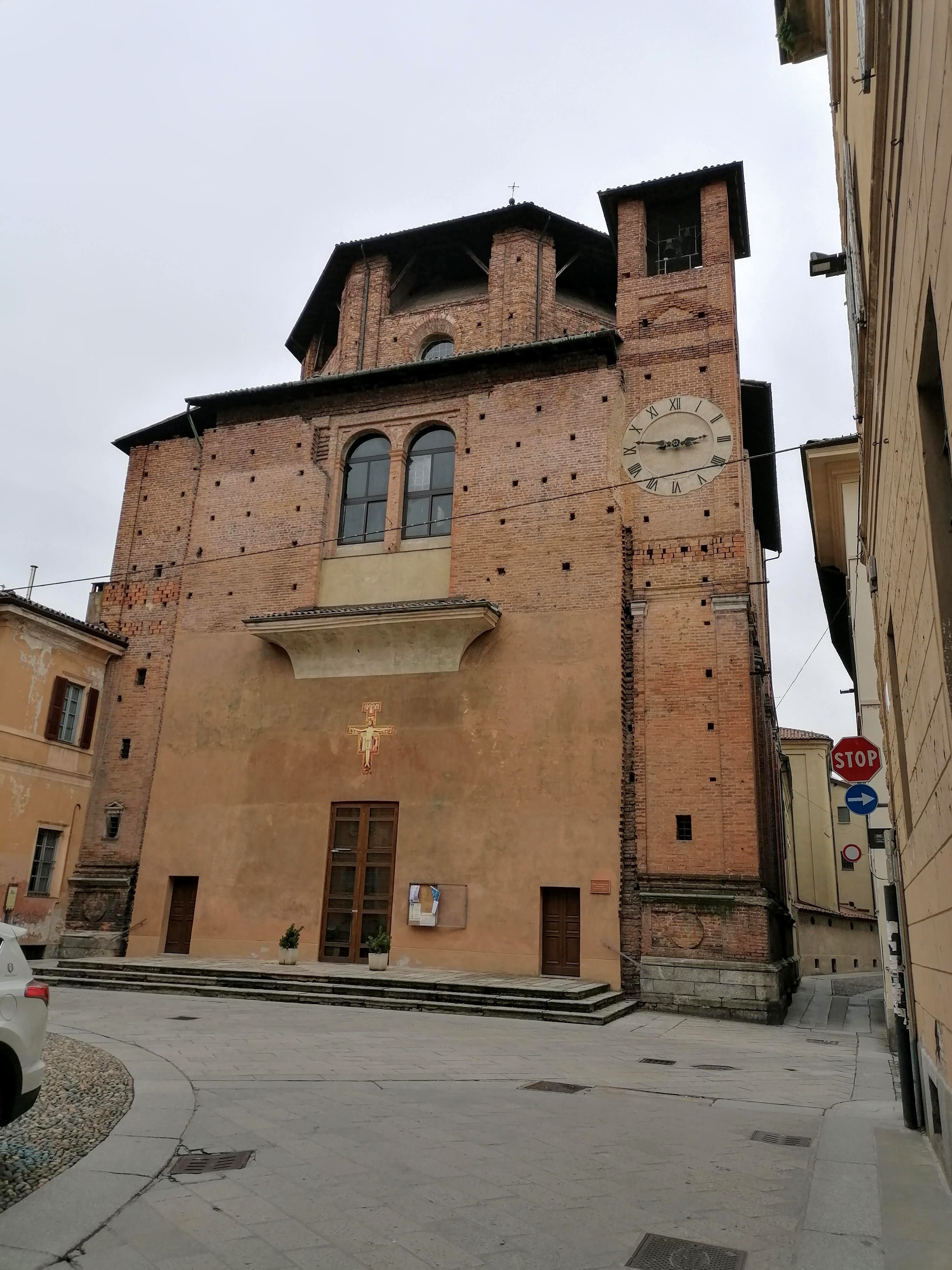
- Façade

Religion
- Affiliation: Roman Catholic
- Province: Pavia

Location
- Location: Pavia, Italy
- Interactive map of Santa Maria di Canepanova
- Coordinates: 45°11′8″N 9°9′32.5″E

Architecture
- Architects: Giovanni Antonio Amadeo, Donato Bramante?
- Type: Church
- Style: Renaissance and Mannerism
- Groundbreaking: 16th century

Santa Maria di Canepanova is a Renaissance-style Roman Catholic church located in central Pavia, region of Lombardy, Italy. Although in the past the design was popularly attributed to Bramante, the church was designed by Giovanni Antonio Amadeo.

== History ==
The construction works of the church began in 1500 and the first part was completed in 1507. The construction project is earlier if it is true that in 1492 the Confraternity of Santa Maria Immacolata di Canepanova was founded, which is responsible for raising the necessary funds for the construction of the church. The works were carried out under the direction of Giovanni Antonio Amadeo (although according to some scholars the project of the church is by Bramante). In the place where the church was built there was a house of the noble Canepanova family, on a wall of this house a Nursing Madonna was frescoed and, around 1492, several miracles were attributed to the fresco and it was therefore decided to incorporate it in the new church. The construction works were interrupted during the war periods, only being completed in the 16th century with the arrival in 1557 of the Barnabite fathers, who completed the construction with the erection of the dome. The church was consecrated in 1564 by Cardinal Ippolito de 'Rossi. Since 1915 the church has been entrusted to the Franciscan friars.

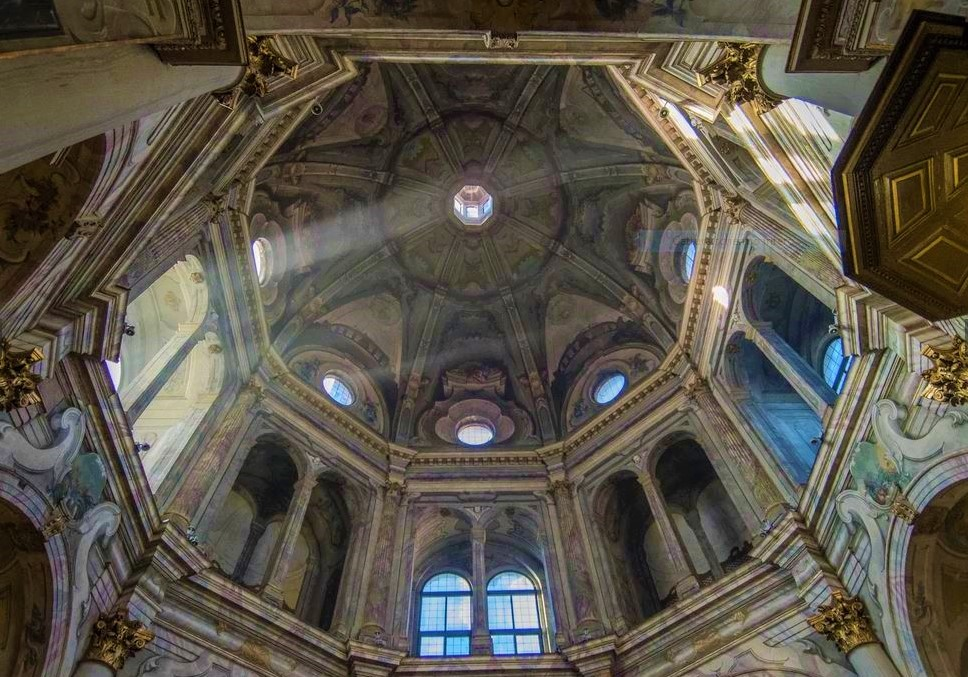
The dome

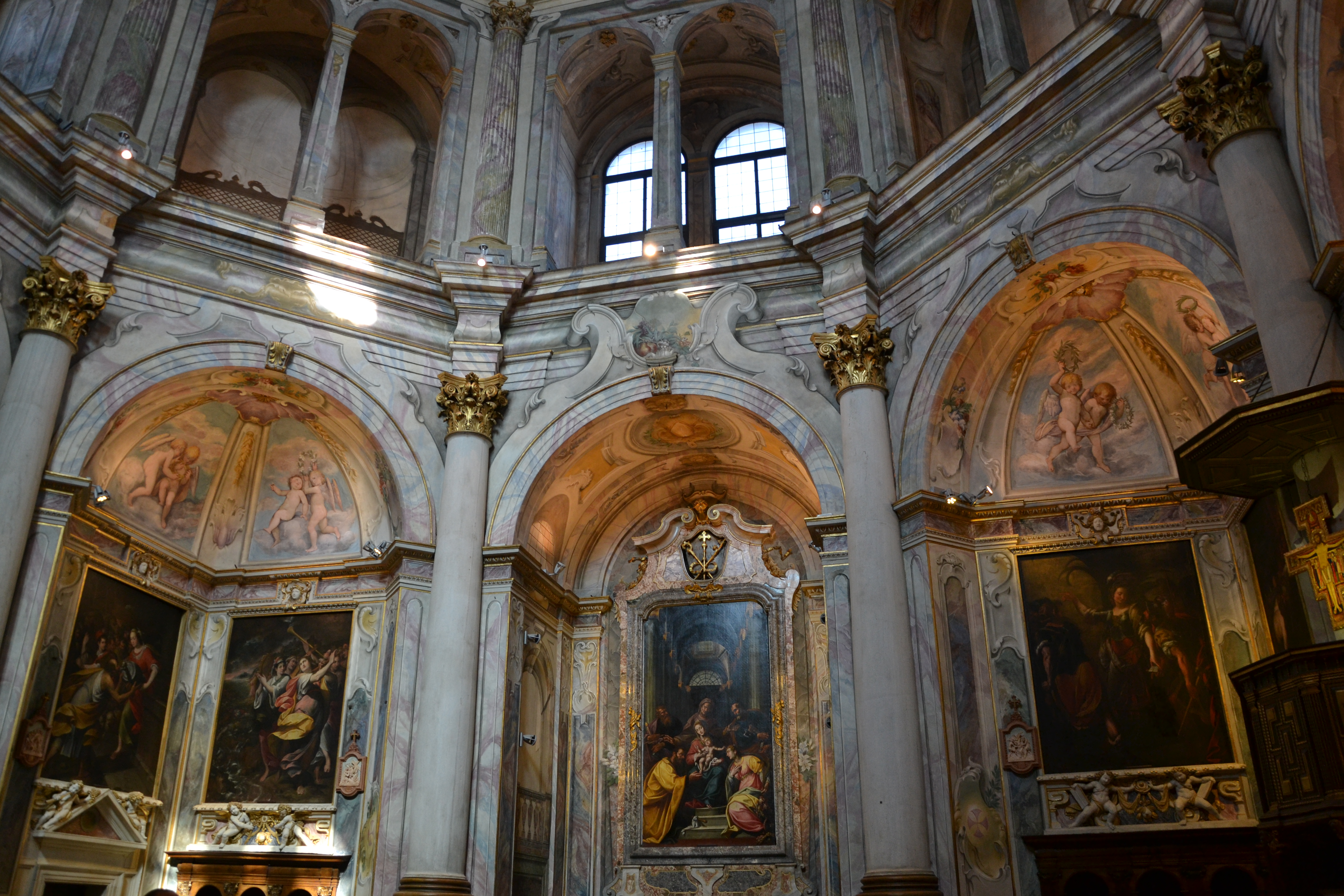
Interior

== Architecture ==
The church is divided into a cubic volume set on a square plan, on which rest an octagonal dome and four small bell towers at the corners. Inside, the central plan space is generated by the eight sides of the dome projected within the square perimeter of the church; the figure thus inscribed creates a succession of niches for each of the faces of the octagon. The façade is unfinished and is plastered in the lower part. In the southern part there is a very particular decoration of circular shapes tangent to each other, enclosed by a terracotta frame. The internal decoration was made at the beginning of the seventeenth century by important painters of the Baroque school. The central hall has a square shape, on which an octagonal division is inserted in the upper part that follows that of the dome. The presbytery was built starting in 1564. In the sails in which the second dome that covers the main altar is set, eight sibyls arranged in pairs, painted by Guglielmo Caccia, are represented.

To the side of the presbytery there are two chapels. On the left the chapel of the Crucifix which houses, in a niche in the east wall, the wooden complex of the Crucifix brought as a dowry by the brotherhood of Saint Sebastian. On the north wall there is the canvas of the Resurrection by Pietro Maggi, and on the west wall another canvas with the Assumption of the Virgin. To the right of the presbytery is the Chapel of the Immaculate Conception. On the east wall is the canvas with The Immaculate Conception by Bernardino Ciceri. Opposite, on the other hand, the canvas with the Coronation of the Virgin. In the thick wall that divides the hall from the presbytery, in two small rooms, are placed: on the left the canvas depicting St. Charles Borromeo in bishop's robes on the right, in front, the canvas with St. Alexander Sauli, both canvases were made by Guglielmo Caccia in 1614.

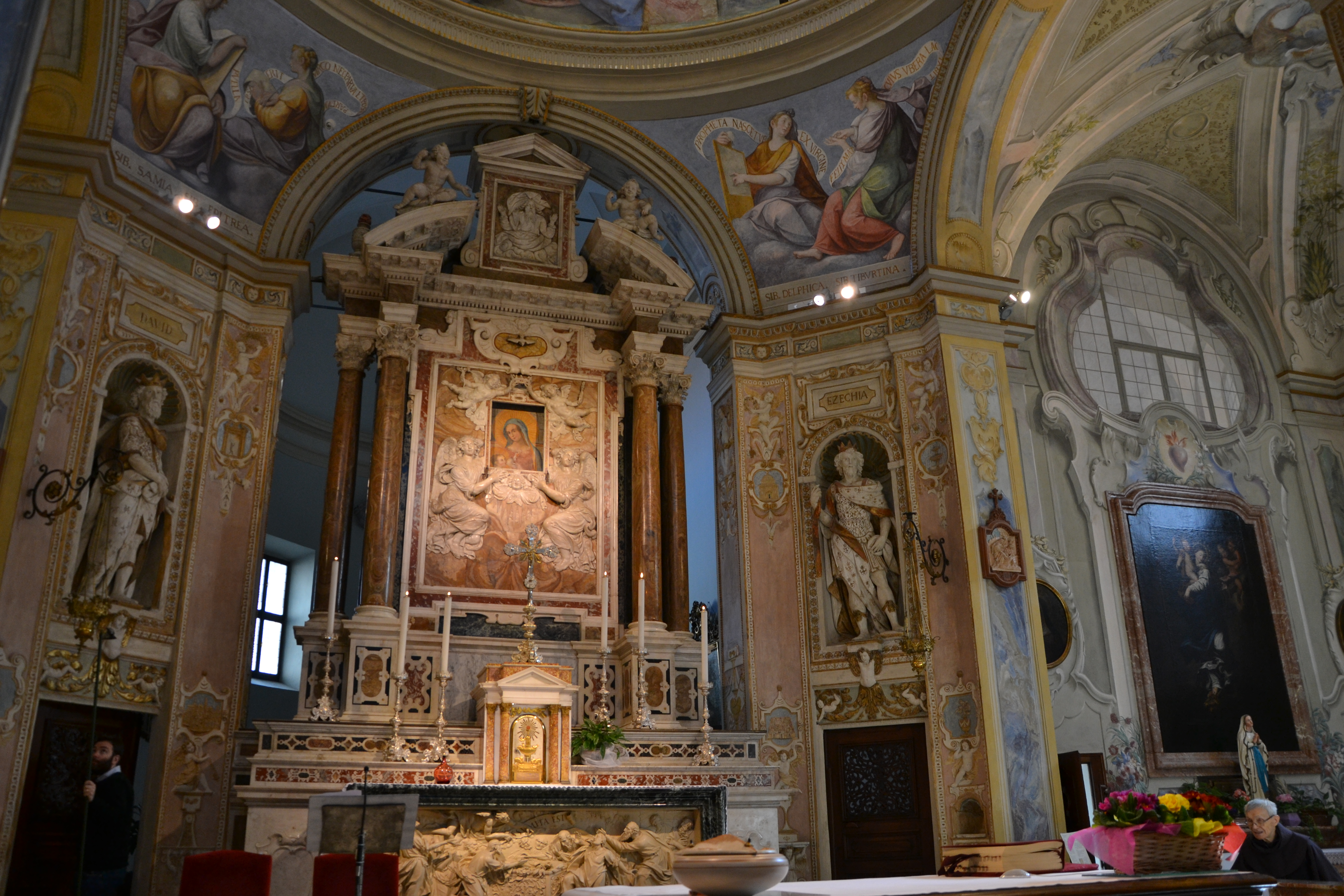
High altar

In the side walls of the hall there are two chapels, on the left that of Saint Anne and on the right that of Saint Joseph. In the four corners the large canvases of the cycle of biblical heroines are exhibited in pairs.

On the altar of the chapel of Saint Anne there is the canvas attributed to Gianbattista Tassinari, a painter from Pavia of the early seventeenth century. The painting depicts the Madonna with Child and, behind her standing, her mother Saint Anne with Saint Peter and Saint Paul on either side, who is also the patron saint of the Barnabites. In front of the kneeling Virgin are portraits of St. James and St. Margaret of Antioch. Originally the Pavese nobles Jacopo Menocchio and his nephew Enrico were buried in the chapel, as can be seen from the mural inscriptions on the side walls.

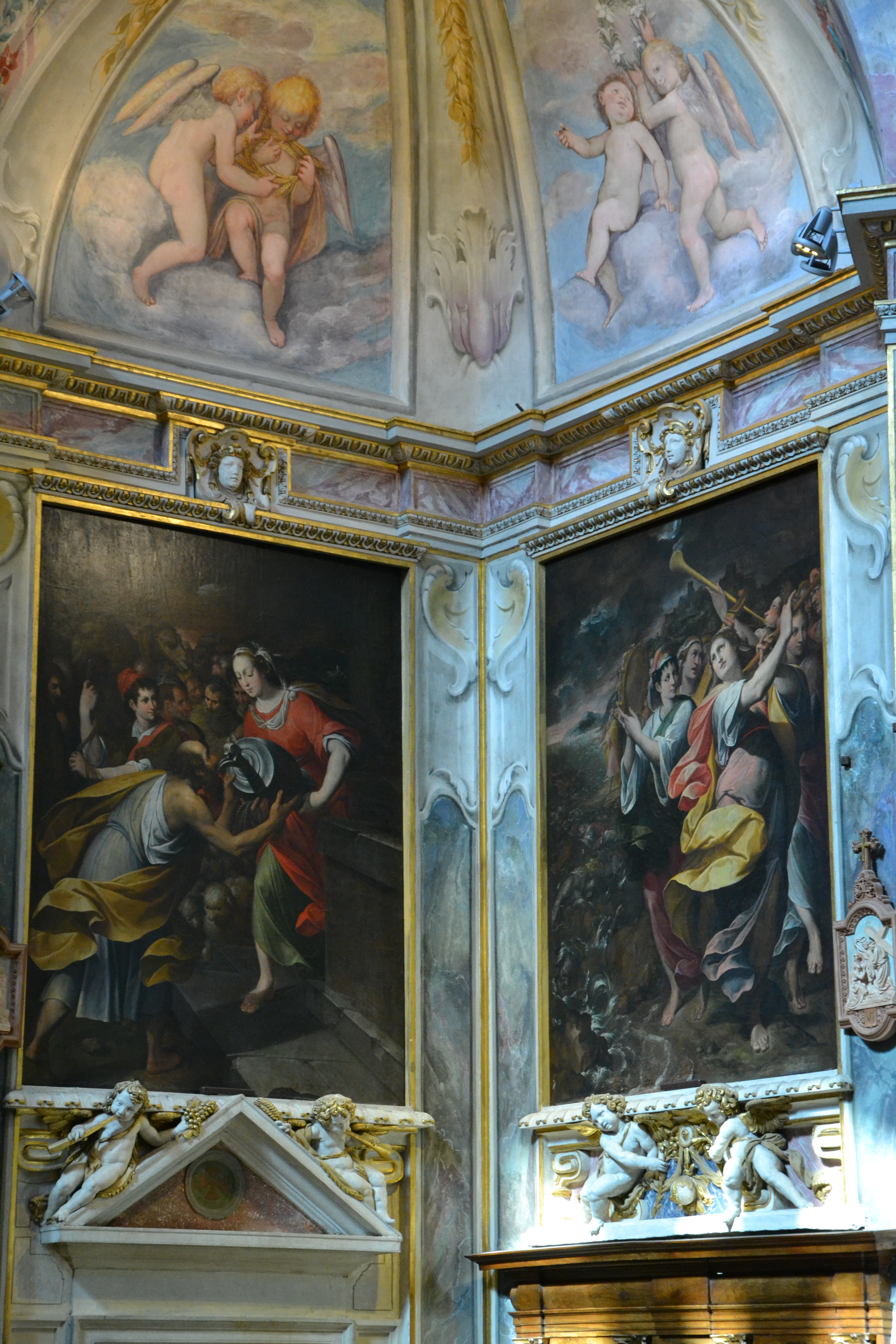
Canvases by Camillo Procaccini.

Originally the chapel was dedicated to St. Alexander Sauli on the occasion of his beatification, as can be seen from the bishop's miter painted on the vault. The painting with the saint was moved to the sacristy with the advent of the Franciscans, while the chapel was rededicated to Saint Anne.

On the altar of the chapel of St. Joseph there is the canvas by Simone Peterzano representing the Nativity with the Holy Family: there are figures of saints and other adoring figures (on the right St. Anthony of Padua). At the corners of the hall is a cycle of eight canvases depicting biblical heroines. The cycle intends to present, through the events of the female characters of the Old Testament, the virtues that are typical of the Madonna. The canvases were painted in the first quarter of the 17th century by four different painters: Camillo Procaccini, Giulio Cesare Procaccini, Alessandro Tiarini and Guglielmo Caccia. Under each canvas there is a frame supported by two angels / cherubs who assume different postures.

Behind the choir of the church, to the east of the same, a small building with a portico in the lower part and open above into a loggia is still preserved. The structure predates the church and, originally, the small monastery of the Convertite (later incorporated into the church). The building is divided into two orders: the first has a portico, covered by rib vaults, has columns and capitals of the late Gothic type in granite, while higher up there are figures of half-length angels, with large wings and hands intertwined on the chest. The cloister is dated between 1460 and 1480.
