= Carlo Antonio Procaccini =

Italian painter

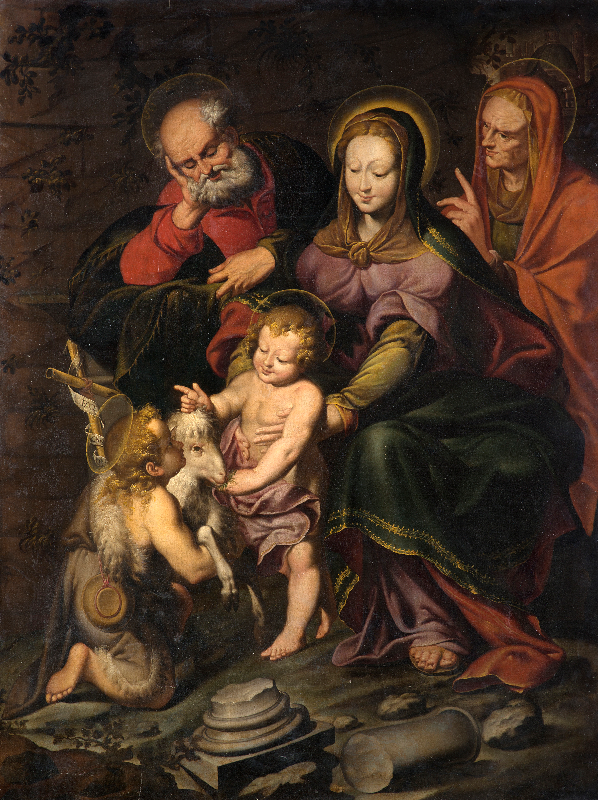
- Holy Family with Little St. John the Baptist, 1600, priv. col.
- Born: January 13, 1571; Bologna, Papal States
- Died: 1630 (aged 58–59); Milan, Duchy of Milan
- Education: Ercole Procaccini the Elder
- Known for: Painting
- Movement: Mannerism

Carlo Antonio Procaccini (January 13, 1571 – 1630) was an Italian painter of the late-Renaissance period.

== Life and works ==
Carlo Antonio Procaccini was the third son of Ercole, the brother of Camillo and Giulio Cesare the elder, and father of Ercole Procaccini the Younger (1605–1675). He was born at Bologna and initially trained by his father, though he excelled in painting landscapes and still-lifes with flowers and fruit, mainly in Milan. According to Lanzi, Procaccini was a prolific artist and his paintings were greatly in demand by contemporaries. However, few of his works seem to have survived, or else they are yet to be attributed to him.
