= Camillo Procaccini =

Italian painter

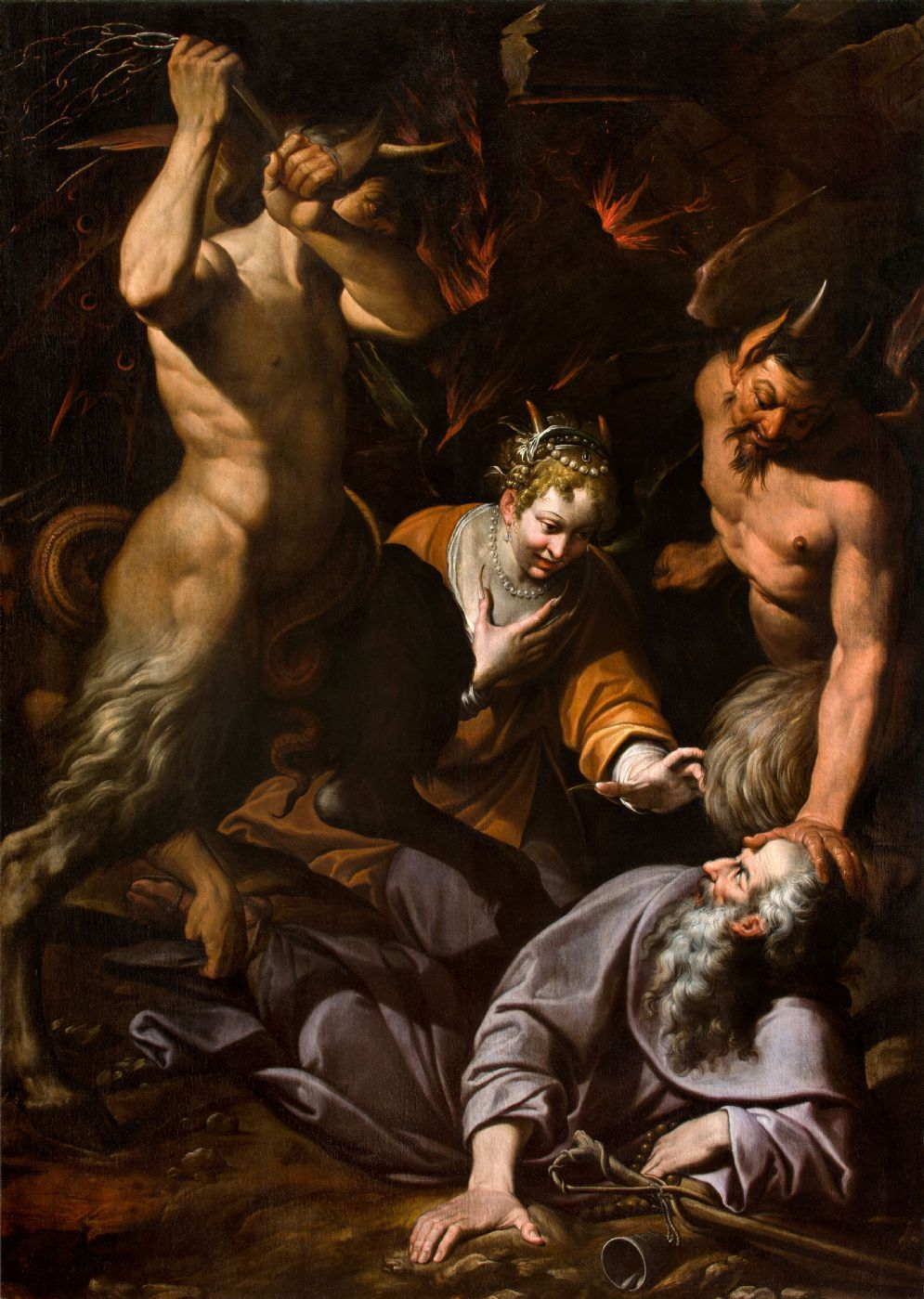
- The temptations of St. Anthony Abbot, priv. col.
- Born: March 31, 1561; Parma, Duchy of Parma and Piacenza
- Died: 21 August 1629 (aged 68); Milan, Duchy of Milan
- Education: Ercole Procaccini the Elder
- Known for: Painting
- Movement: Mannerism; Milanese Baroque

Camillo Procaccini (3 March 1561 at Parma – 21 August 1629) was an Italian painter. He has been posthumously referred to as the Vasari of Lombardy, for his prolific Mannerist fresco decoration.

== Life and works ==
Born in Bologna, he was the son of the painter Ercole Procaccini the Elder, and older brother to Giulio Cesare and Carlo Antonio, both painters. In 1587 he distinguished in the fresco decoration of the Basilica della Ghiara in Reggio Emilia. In the late 1580s he moved to Milan, where count Camillo Visconti Borromeo commissioned him the decoration of his villa in Lainate. The organ shutters for the Cathedral of Milan were painted after 1590 by Camillo, Giuseppe Meda (died 1599), and Ambrogio Figino. He painted the frescoes of the nave and the apse of the Cathedral of Piacenza in collaboration with Ludovico Carracci (1605–1609), and the vault and choir in San Barnaba of Milan. He painted a Nativity in the Sacro Monte d'Orta.

He is known for a Martyrdom of St. Agnes painted in fresco in the sacristy of the Milan cathedral; a Madonna and Child painted for the church of Santa Maria del Carmine; an 'Adoration of the Shepherds found in the Brera; and the ceiling of the church of Padri Zoccolanti, representing the Assumption of the Virgin. He painted an altarpiece with the Annunciation for the Certosa di Pavia and two canvases with Mary sister of Moses who rejoices after the passage of the Red Sea and Rebecca who quenches the thirst of Abraham's servant from the cycle of heroines of the Bible (1620–1623) for the church of Santa Maria di Canepanova in Pavia.

In the 1620s, Procaccini was in Reggio Emilia, where he frescoed a large Last Judgment in the apse of the church of San Prospero. In the same city he painted St. Roch administering the Sacrament to the Plague-stricken for the Church of St. Roch. After the demolition of the church, in 1746, the painting was sold to the Gemäldegalerie Alte Meister of Dresden and was destroyed during the bombing of the city in 1945. At Santa Maria del Suffragio, Piacenza he painted Immaculate Conception with Saints Francis and Anthony.

Procaccini died in Milan on 21 August 1629, aged 68. Among his pupils was the painter Giovanni Battista Discepoli. Another pupil was Lorenzo Franchi (c. 1563 – c. 1630).

Paintings by Camillo Procaccini

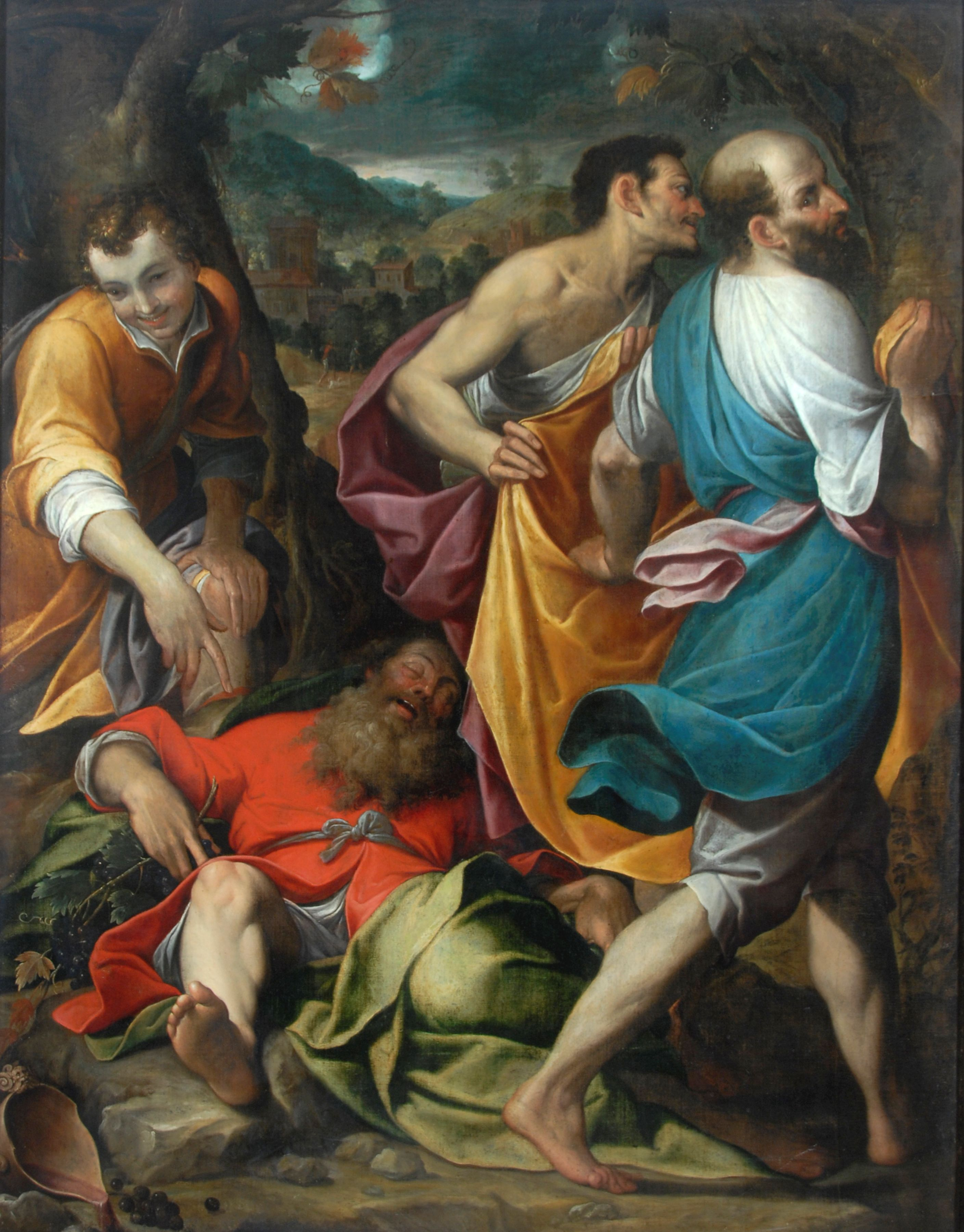
The Drunkenness of Noah, Laing Art Gallery, Newcastle upon Tyne

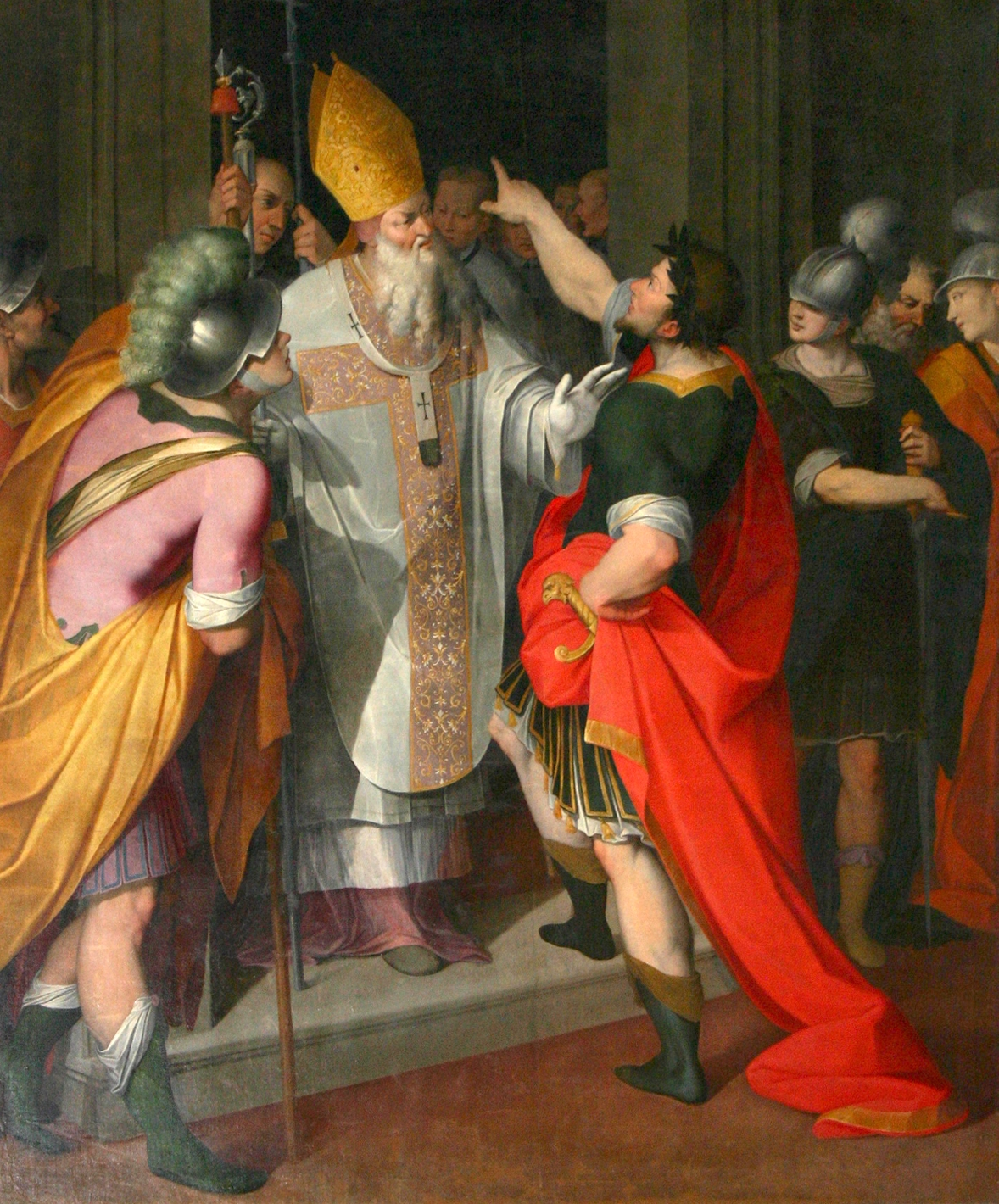
Ambrose stops Theodosius, Basilica of Sant'Ambrogio, Milan

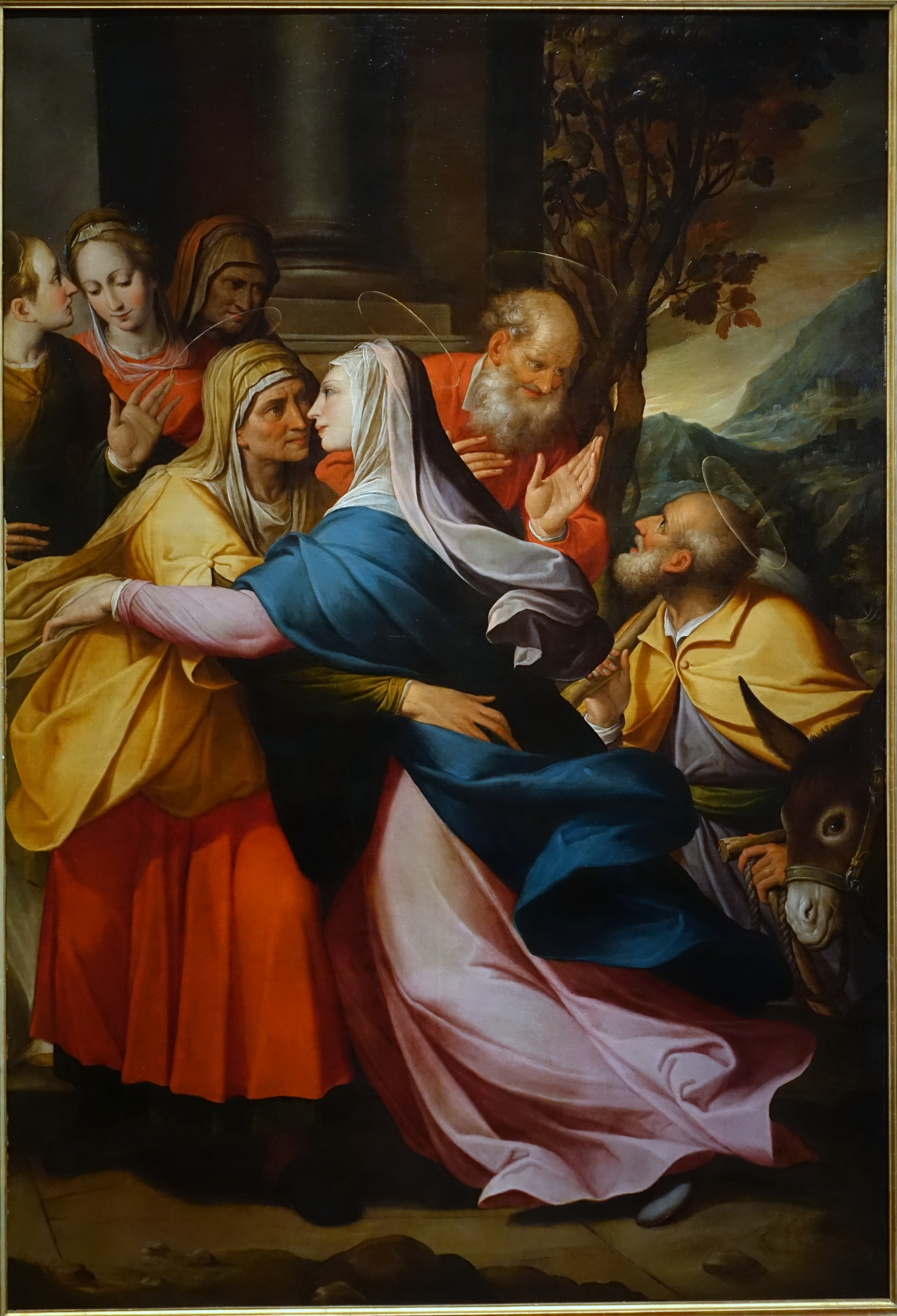
The Visitation, Blanton Museum of Art, Austin, Texas

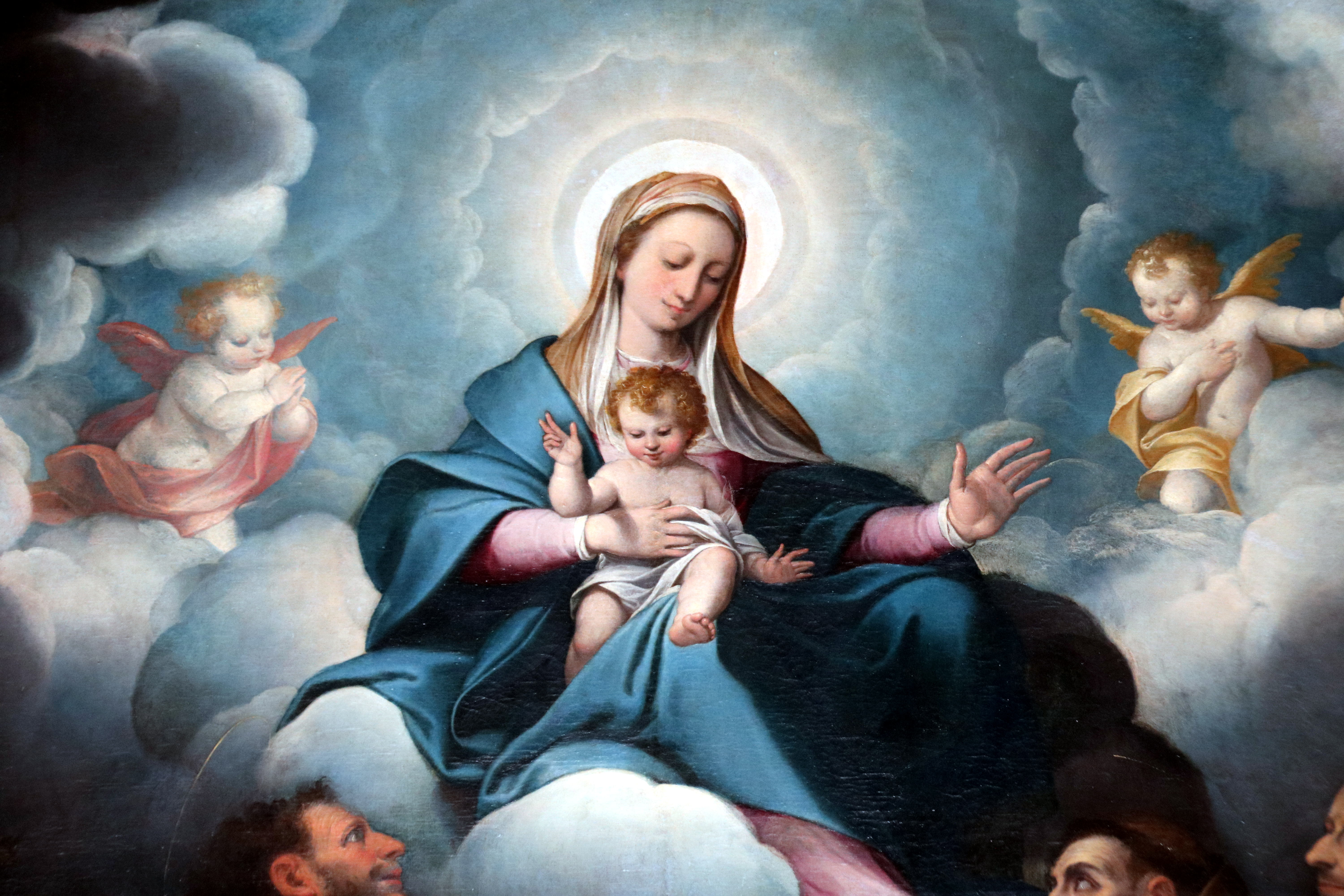
Virgin in Glory with St. Thomas, St. Charles and St. Francis, San Sisto, Piacenza

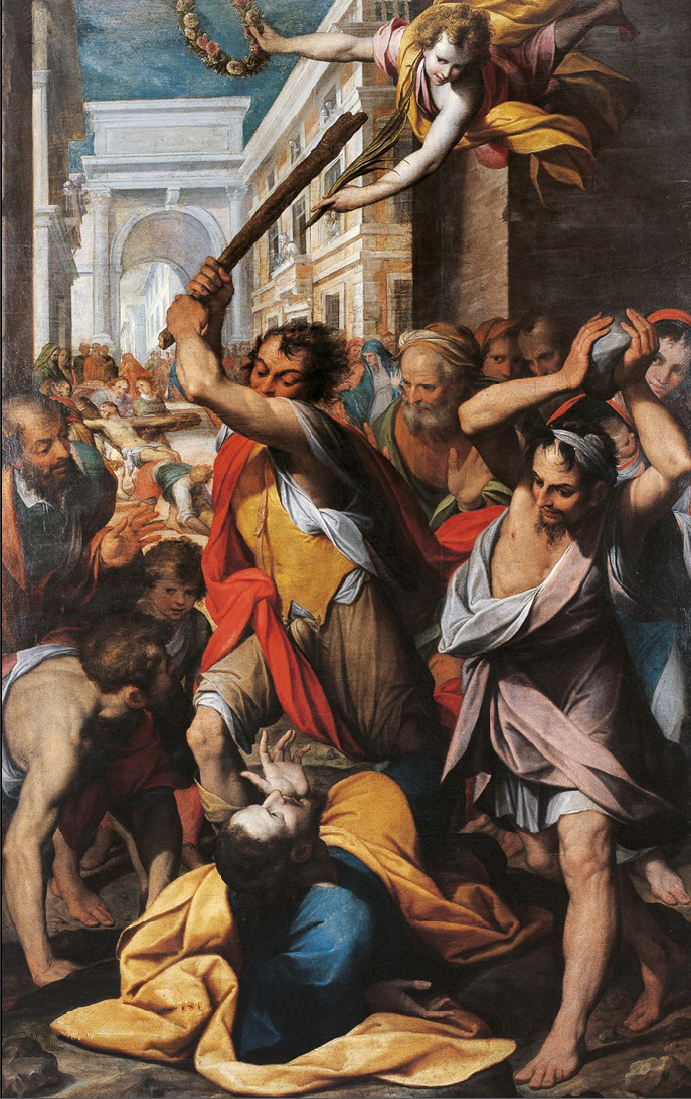
The Martyrdom of St. James and St. Philip, Pinacoteca Civica, Ravenna

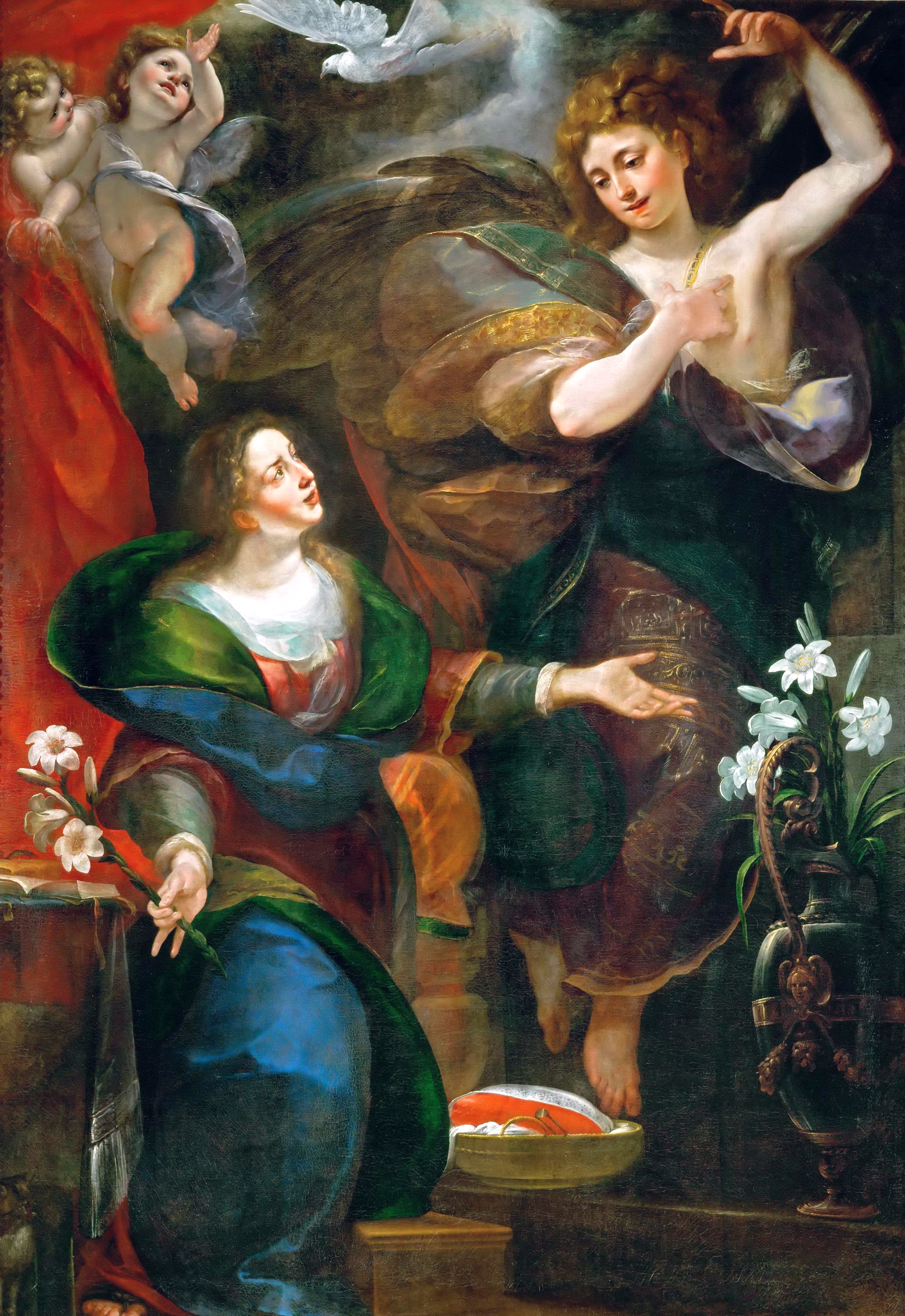
The Annunciation, Louvre, Paris

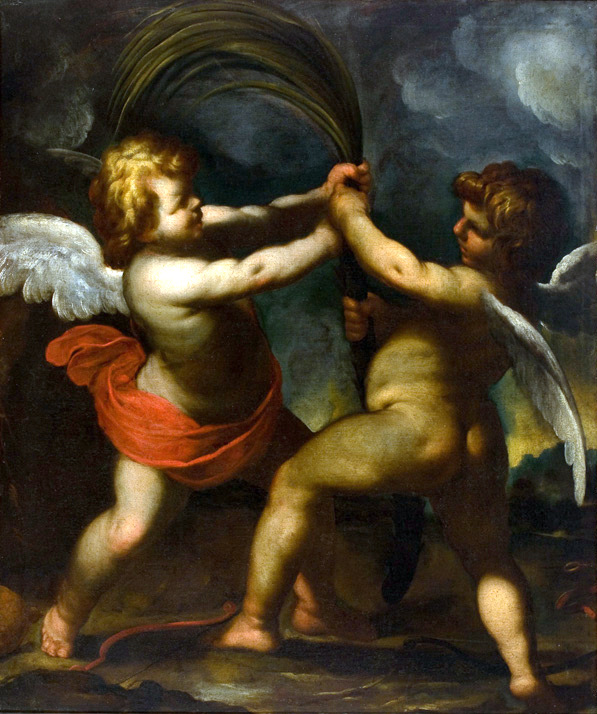
Eros and Anteros, Museu Nacional de Belas Artes, Rio de Janeiro

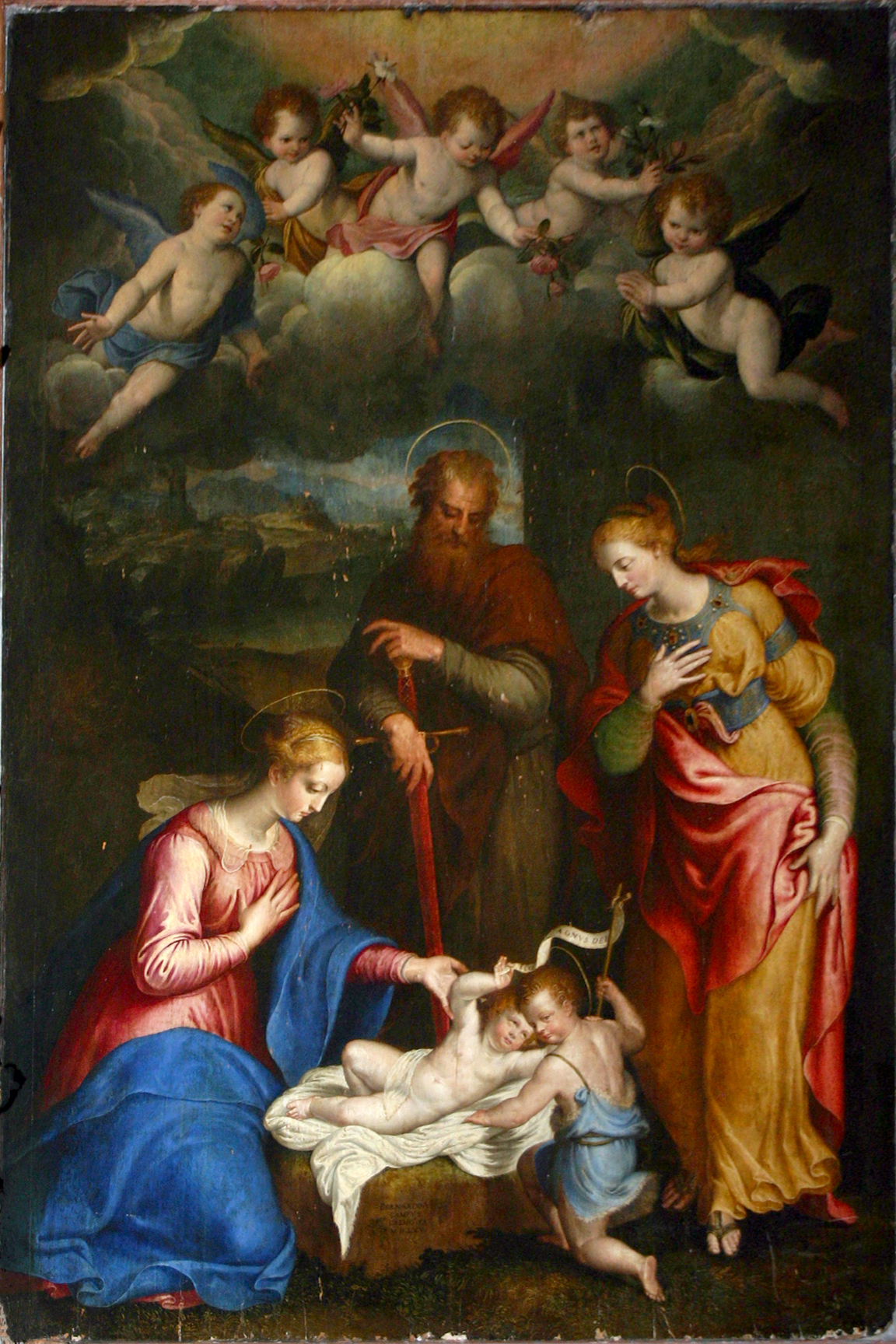
Madonna with saints Paul, Barbara and John the Baptist, Sant'Antonio Abate, Milan
