= Ercole Procaccini the Elder =

Italian painter

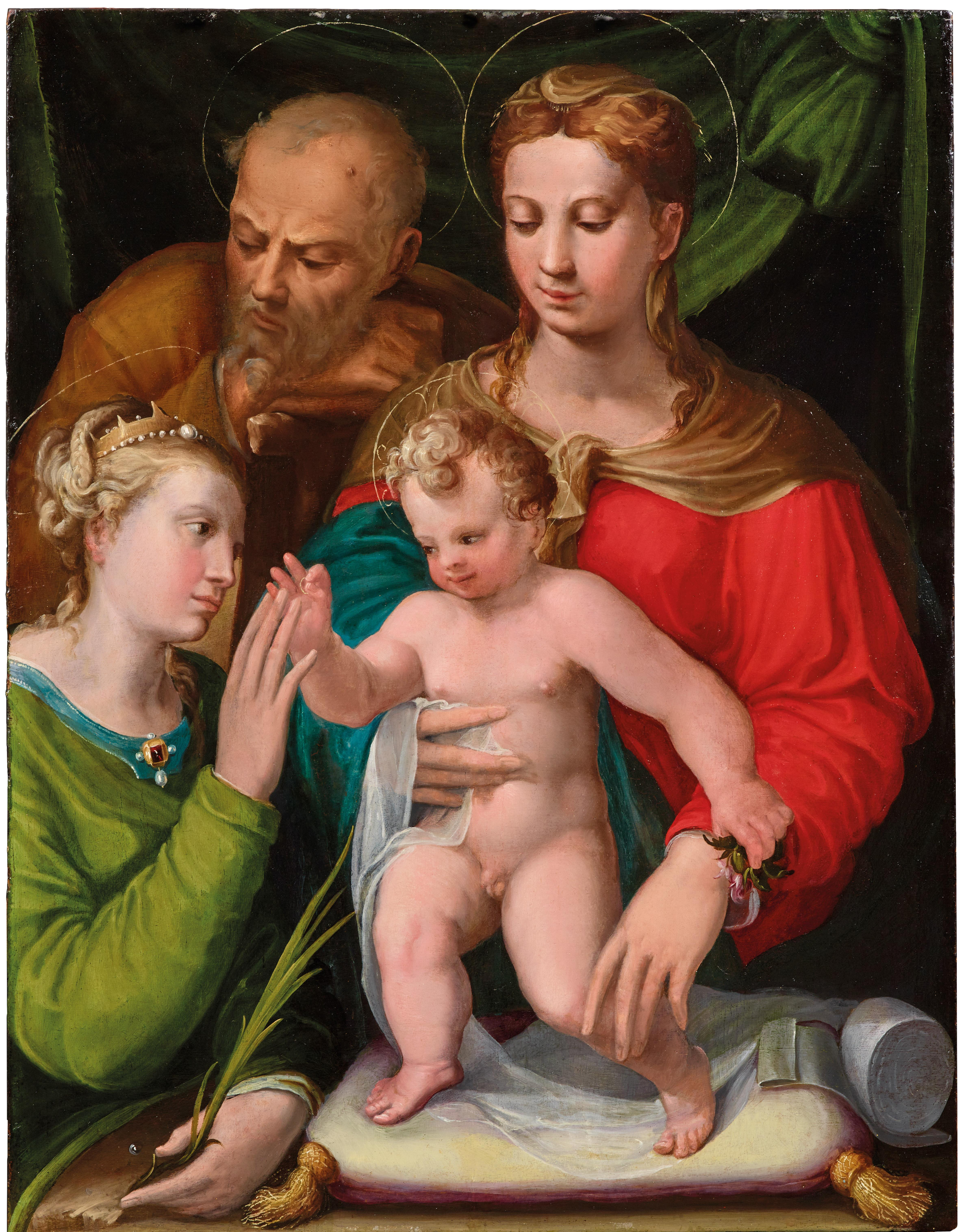
- Mystic Marriage of St. Catherine, priv. col.
- Born: February 1520; Bologna, Papal States
- Died: 13 January 1595 (aged 74); Milan, Duchy of Milan
- Known for: Painting
- Movement: Renaissance; Mannerism
- Children: Carlo Antonio Procaccini; Giulio Cesare Procaccini; Camillo

Ercole Procaccini the Elder (February 1520 – January 13, 1595) was an Italian painter of the Renaissance period, mainly active in Milan.

== Biography ==
Ercole Procaccini was born in Bologna in February 1520. He painted an Annunciation for the church of San Benedetto, a Conversion of St. Paul and a Christ in the Garden for San Giacomo Maggiore, a St. Michael defeating the rebel Angels for San Bernardo, and a Deposition from the Cross for the church of Santo Stefano. He was active as an officer in the newly formed painters’ guild Compagnia dei Pittori between 1569 and 1585 and its head from January to April 1585, just before he left Bologna. In the mid-1580s the Procaccini family moved to Milan, where Ercole established an academy which became celebrated in his time, and, besides his own sons (Carlo Antonio, Giulio Cesare and Camillo turned out distinguished artists of the Milanese school. He died in Milan on January 13, 1595, aged 74.
