= Giulio Cesare Procaccini =

Italian painter (1574–1625)

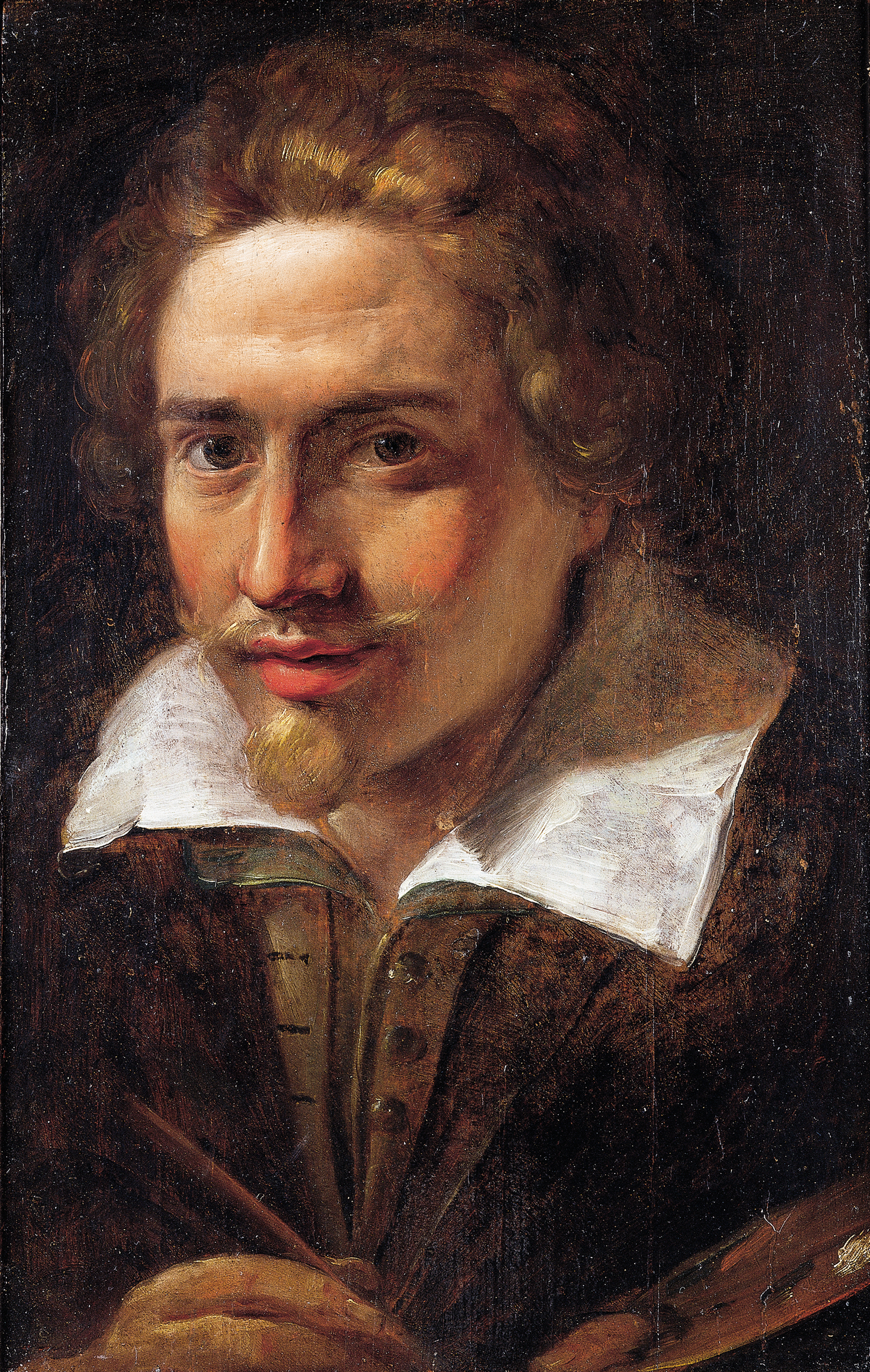
- Self Portrait, Koelliker priv. col., Milan
- Born: May 30, 1574; Bologna, Papal States
- Died: 14 November 1625 (aged 51); Milan, Duchy of Milan
- Education: Ercole Procaccini the Elder
- Known for: Painting
- Notable work: Mystic Marriage of Saint Catherine (c. 1616–1620)
- Movement: Mannerism; Milanese Baroque

Giulio Cesare Procaccini (30 May 1574 – 14 November 1625) was an Italian painter and sculptor of the early Baroque era in Milan. He worked with Giovanni Battista Crespi (Il Cerano) and Pier Francesco Mazzucchelli (Il Morazzone) following the directions of Cardinal Federico Borromeo, patron of the arts and cousin of Charles Borromeo.

== Biography ==
=== Early career ===
Born in Bologna he was son of the Mannerist painter Ercole Procaccini the Elder and brother of Camillo Procaccini and Carlo Antonio Procaccini. The family moved to Milan around 1585 with the help of the rich art collector Pirro Visconti. Giulio Cesare began as a sculptor in the Cathedral and in the Milanese church of Santa Maria presso San Celso.

In 1597 he may have accompanied his brother Camillo to Reggio Emilia, where Camillo added to his earlier fresco decorations for San Prospero. Between 1597 and 1600 Giulio Cesare is documented as working as a sculptor for Cremona Cathedral, to which two sculptures, St. Matthew and St. John, were delivered, after many delays, in 1625. He also produced the gilded wood Guardian Angel (1597; Cremona, Museo Civico Ala Ponzone) for Santa Monica, Cremona. From Cremona he travelled to Parma, where he studied the works of Correggio, Parmigianino and Girolamo Mazzola Bedoli, which had a significant impact on the style of his early paintings.

About 1600 Procaccini turned from sculpture to painting. Between 1602 and 1607 he worked again on the decoration of Santa Maria presso San Celso. For a chapel on the left side he painted a Pietà (1604), his first dated painting, and decorative frescoes. The altarpiece, the Martyrdom of St. Nazaro and St. Celso (signed and dated 1606), and vault frescoes were for the chapel of the same name. The altarpiece reveals Procaccini's predilection for morbid and violent scenes and makes an intense emotional appeal.

At Santa Maria presso San Celso he worked alongside Giovanni Battista Crespi and on 25 August 1605 he won a commission for nine pictures for the chapel of Milan's Tribunale di Provissione, of which three are known: St. Barnabas, St. Sebastian (both c. 1606) and the delayed Emperor Constantine Receiving the Instruments of the Passion (1620; all Milan, Sforza Castle). While the figure of St. Sebastian clearly demonstrates his continuing interest in a sculptural treatment of the human form, over the 15 years of this employment his style oscillated, creating difficulties in accurately dating his works.

=== Mature works ===
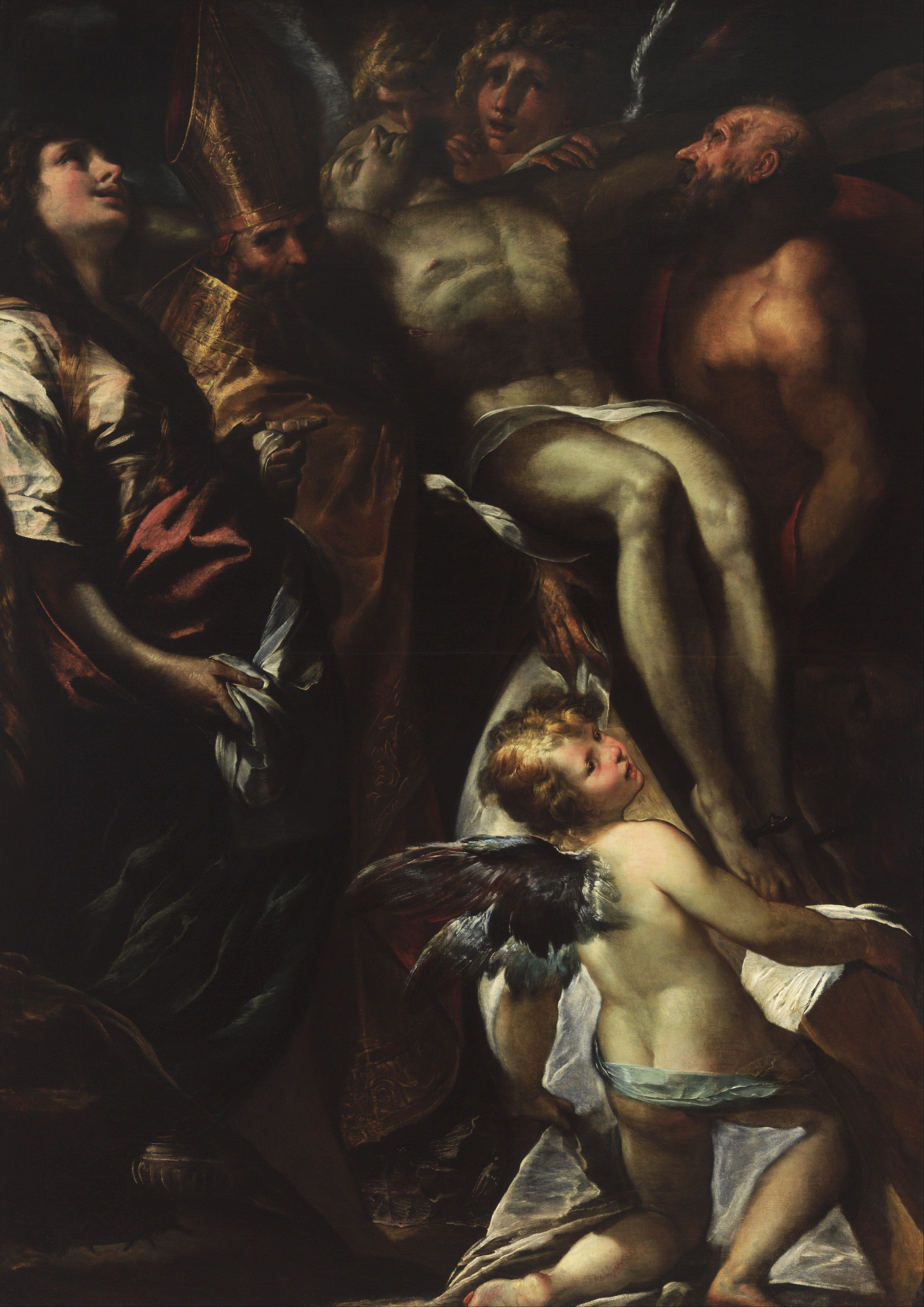
The Lowering of the Cross with Sts Mary Magdalene, Augustine, Jerome and Angels, c. 1618, Art Gallery of New South Wales, The Domain, Sydney

In 1610 Giulio Cesare painted six of the Quadroni, large canvases celebrating Charles Borromeo (Milan Cathedral). These pictures joined a first series of quadroni, already in place, that were intended to promote the canonization of Charles Borromeo. This event, scheduled to occur on the counter-reformer's birthday, 4 November 1610, caused the cathedral workshop to commission (1609) 24 further quadroni portraying miraculous events associated with Borromeo. Procaccini's works are part of this second series, to which Cerano and other Milanese artists also contributed. Some of Giulio Cesare's contributions to this cycle, such as his Miracle of Carlino Nava, reject the lucid approach advocated by Counter-Reformation theorists, favouring instead an old-fashioned spatial ambiguity reminiscent of Parmese Mannerism. Yet others, such as the Miracle of Giovan Battista, exhibit a strong interest in theatrical effects and movement that anticipates the Baroque.

This eclectic and varied style characterizes much of Procaccini's work. From these paintings Giulio Cesare moved to a more fully realized Mannerism, creating graceful figures inspired by Parmigianino. This phase of his work can be seen in the paintings (1612) for the Acerbo Chapel in Sant'Antonio Abate, Milan: the Holy Family, Annunciation and Visitation, each of which is characterized by a composition that stresses the two-dimensional nature of the canvas in a seeming compulsion to fill all the space. Procaccini's talent, combined with a sensitivity to artistic trends, allowed him to develop beyond the limitations of his early works. He evolved a style that employed compositions of increased clarity and balance, probably inspired by observation of Italian High Renaissance art and in keeping with the contemporary development of Cerano and il Morazzone.

Although he continued to employ a Mannerist vocabulary, these new works transmitted a near-Baroque depth of feeling. His Circumcision (completed 1616; Modena, Galleria Estense) demonstrates his clearer, more spacious style, which rejected the flat patterning of many of his previous works. He also adopted a more brilliant palette, abandoning the general golden tones of works executed 1610–13. The Ecce homo (after 1615; Dallas Museum of Art), with its use of diagonals to indicate recession into depth, also points to his new observance of spatial clarity. Apparent, too, is his emphasis on Christ's suffering and the range of emotions displayed by the row of spectators. His debt to Titian’s Mocking of Christ (1560; ex-Santa Maria delle Grazie, Milan; Paris, Louvre) is evident both in this painting and in his Mocking of Christ (c. 1617; Sheffield, Graves Art Gallery).

=== In Genoa and back ===
A visit to Genoa in 1618 caused a stylistic transformation of Procaccini’s work. He had been invited to the city by the wealthy patron Gian Carlo Doria and apparently found ample employment in the area, for several of his paintings still exist in situ in Genoese locales, including a Virgin (Santa Maria Assunta, Genoa) and Last Supper (Genoa, Basilica della Santissima Annunziata del Vastato). Although the exact nature of the change in style is unclear, it was probably caused by his seeing Rubens’s Circumcision altarpiece (1605; Genoa, Sant'Ambrogio). Certainly, on his return to Milan (after a visit to Turin in 1619) he had adopted a regressive manner of painting, exemplified by Emperor Constantine Receiving the Instruments of the Passion (1620; Milan, Sforza Castle). The figures, clothed in faceted draperies raked by light (a technique he favoured), betray a chilly Mannerism far from the boldly painted works of the period preceding this, suggesting that the work might have originated from an earlier phase; but the revelation of the 1620 date confirms this painting as representative of Procaccini’s late stylistic shift. His exposure to the rather reactionary tastes of Federico Borromeo, whose art academy in Milan opened some time after 1618, as well as the Genoese experience, may have caused this desertion of his previous style.

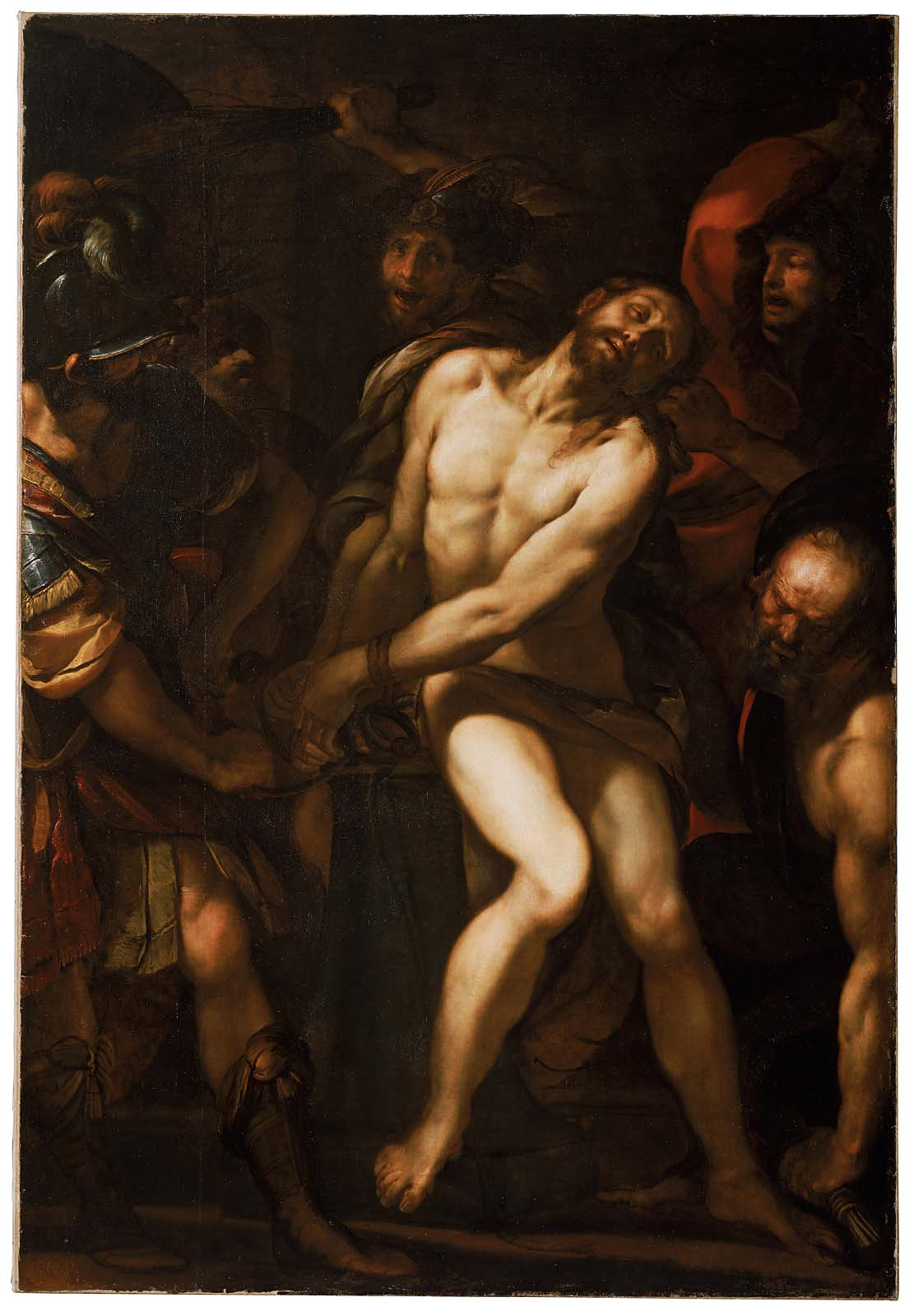
The Scourging of Christ, Museum of Fine Arts, Boston

At about the same time Procaccini participated in what has come to be known as the ‘three-master picture’, painted in collaboration with Cerano and Morazzone. This Martyrdom of St. Rufina and St. Secunda (early 1620s; Milan, Pinacoteca di Brera) displays an odd mixture of artistic expression by the trio of acknowledged masters of Lombard painting during this period. Procaccini was responsible for the depiction of St. Rufina and a putto on the right. The unusual nature of this work represents the contemporary taste for collecting such novelties and suggests the enervation afflicting Lombard painting in the first quarter of the 17th century.

In 1620 for the Church of Santa Maria di Canepanova in Pavia he painted two canvases depicting Debora who has the army gather and Rachel with Jacob at the well and, still in the same city, Saint Teresa for the church of Santa Maria delle Grazie. From that time there is a beautiful garland that Procaccini made in collaboration with the Flemish painter Jan Brueghel, who was also working for Cardinal Borromeo at that time, belongs to the Prado Museum collections and comes from the Spanish royal collection. Procaccini died in Milan on 14 November 1625, aged 51.

=== Critical assessment ===
Procaccini's style shows the influence of Bolognese mannerism and Venetian colorism and marks the beginning of the Baroque. The sometimes puzzling fluctuations in style and pronounced eclecticism that characterize Procaccini's artistic life may detract from an accurate appraisal of his career. He was a painter of considerable ability, and it is to be regretted that he succumbed to the regressive Mannerism of his late period rather than exercising his talent to regenerate the Milanese school and move it forward beyond Mannerism.

== Partial anthology ==
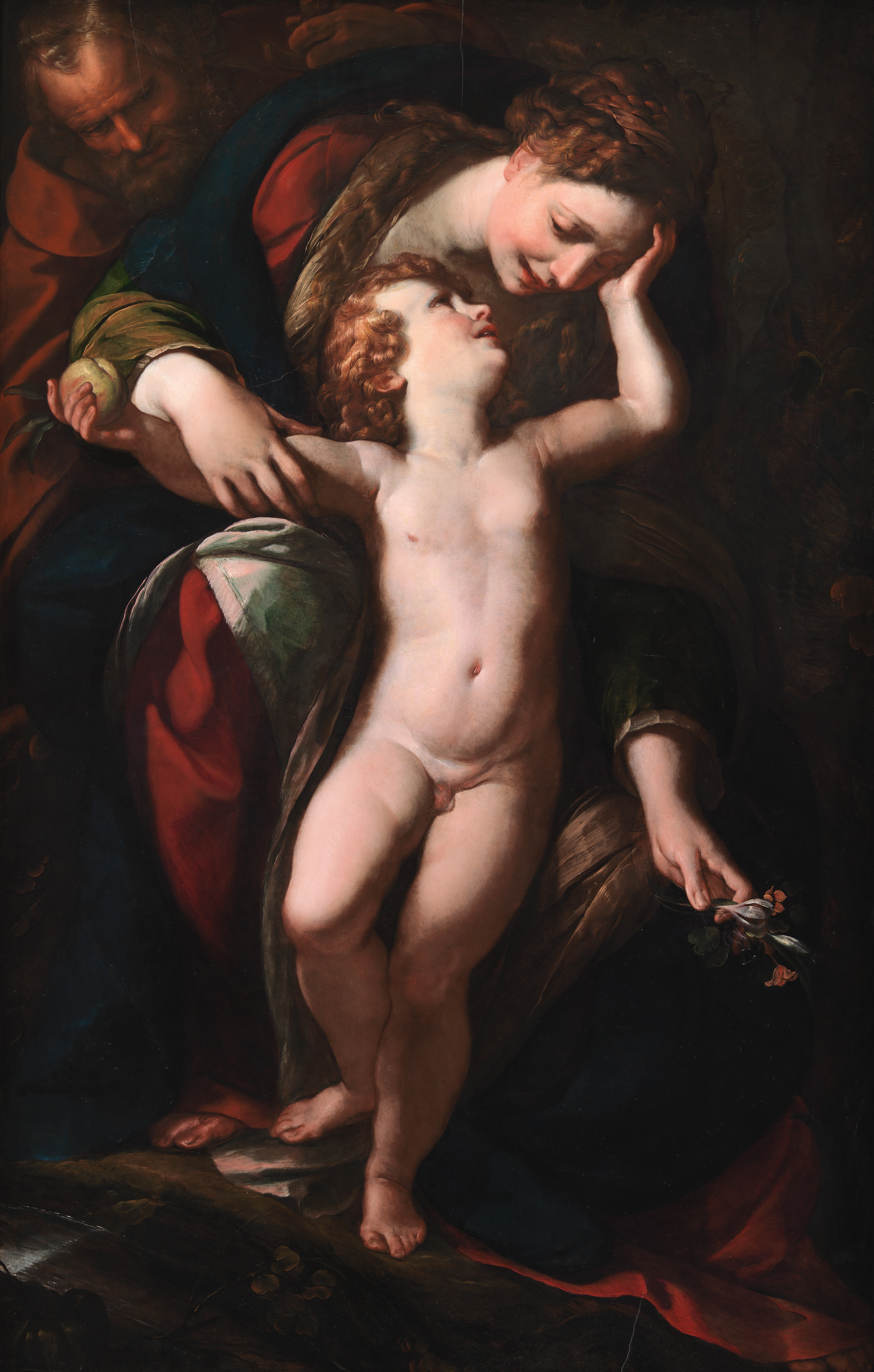
The Holy Family Resting on the Flight into Egypt, between 1613 and 1615, National Gallery of Denmark, Copenhagen

- The Coronation of the Virgin with Saints Joseph and Francis, Getty Center, Los Angeles;
- Madonna and Child with Saints Francis and Dominic and Angels, priv. col.;
- Ecce Homo, 1615–1620, Dallas Museum of Art;
- The Ecstasy of the Magdalen, National Gallery of Art, Washington, D.C.;
- Virgin Mary with a child, little John the Baptist and an Angel, National Gallery Prague;
- The Holy Family Resting on the Flight into Egypt, between 1613 and 1615, National Gallery of Denmark, Copenhagen;
- The Agony in the Garden, 1616–1620, Museo del Prado, Madrid;
- Self portrait, c. 1624, Cerralbo Museum, Madrid;
- Mocking of Christ, c. 1617, Graves Art Gallery, Sheffield;
- The Raising of the Cross, National Galleries of Scotland, Edinburgh;
- The Scourging of Christ, Museum of Fine Arts, Boston;
- Virgin and Child with Angels, Art Institute of Chicago;
- Madonna and Child with Saints Francis and Dominic and Angels, Metropolitan Museum of Art, New York;
- The Lowering of the Cross with Sts Mary Magdalene, Augustine, Jerome and Angels, c. 1618, Art Gallery of New South Wales, The Domain, Sydney;
- Holy Family with John the Baptist and an Angel, between 1620 and 1625, Hermitage Museum, Saint Petersburg;
- The Mystical Marriage of Saint Catherine, Hermitage Museum, Saint Petersburg;
- St. John the Baptist preaching, Art collection of Fondazione Cariplo, Milan.
Works by Giulio Cesare Procaccini

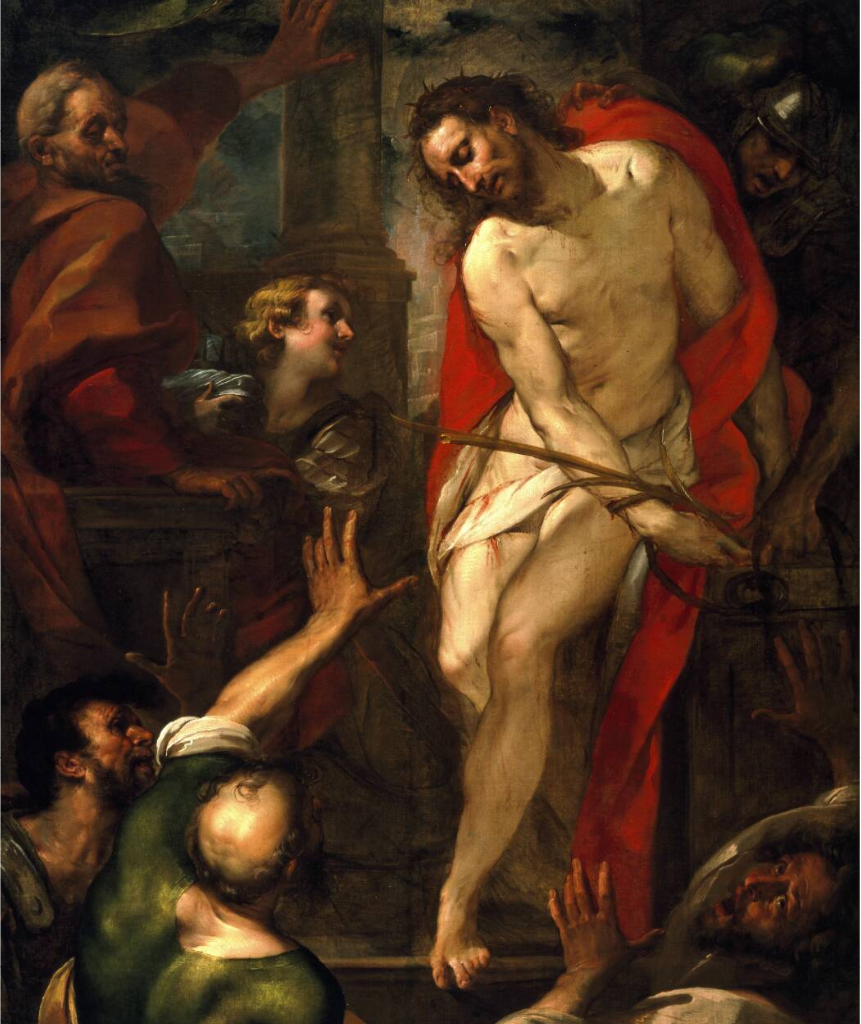
Ecce Homo, 1615–1620, Dallas Museum of Art

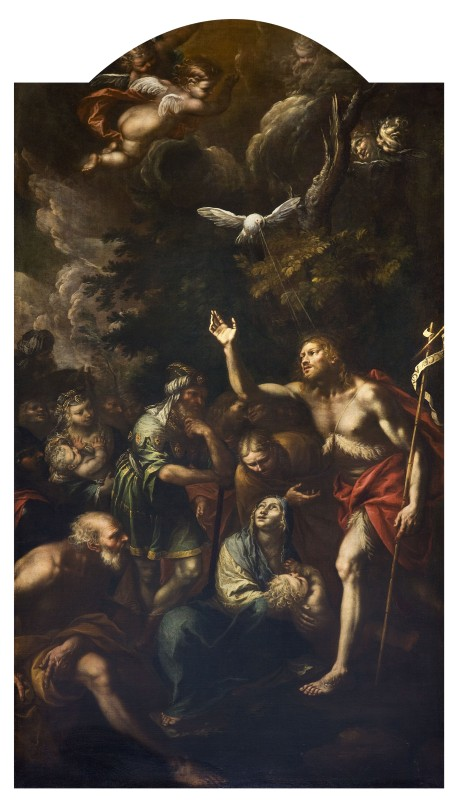
St. John the Baptist preaching, Art collection of Fondazione Cariplo

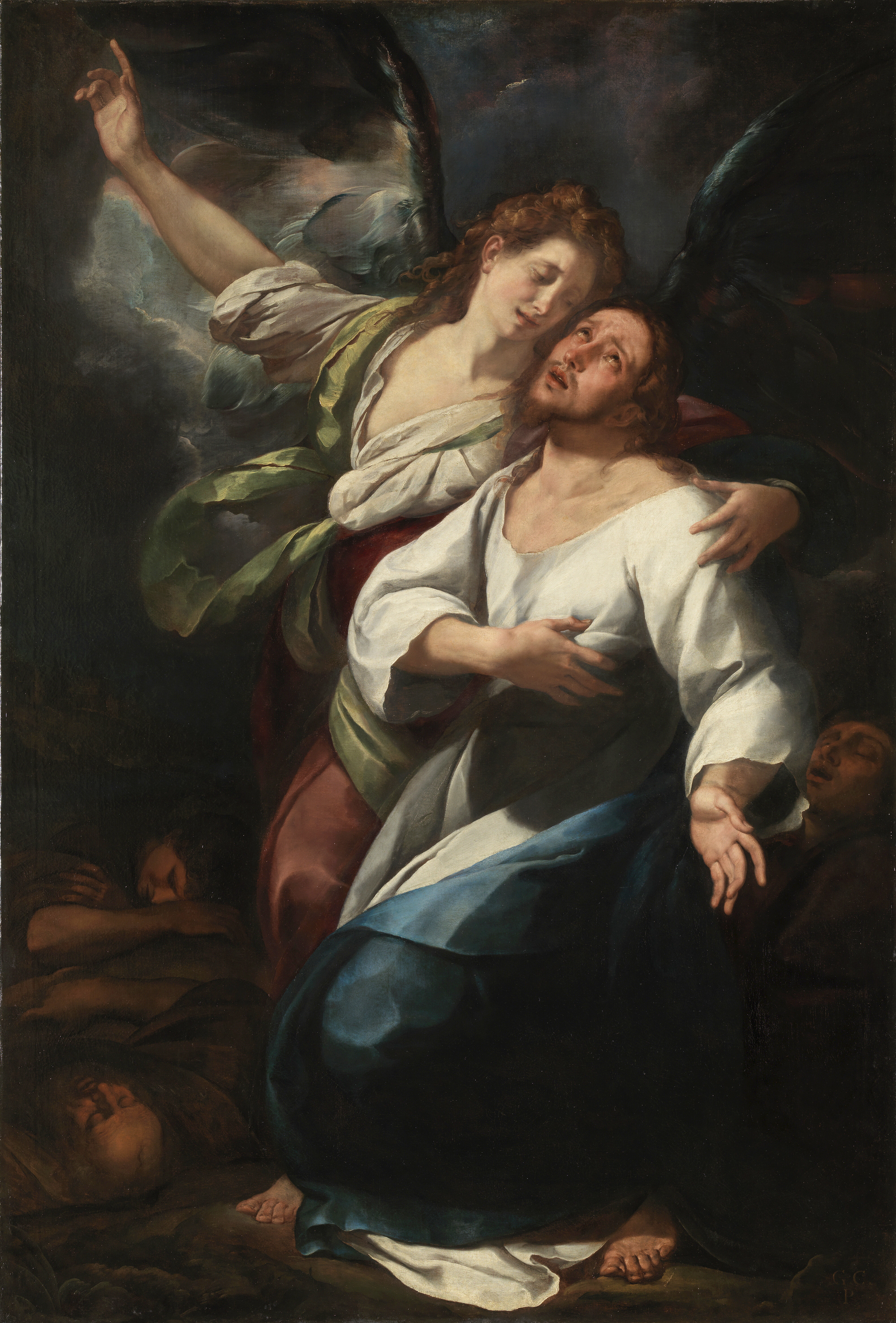
The Agony in the garden, 1616–1620, Prado Museum, Madrid

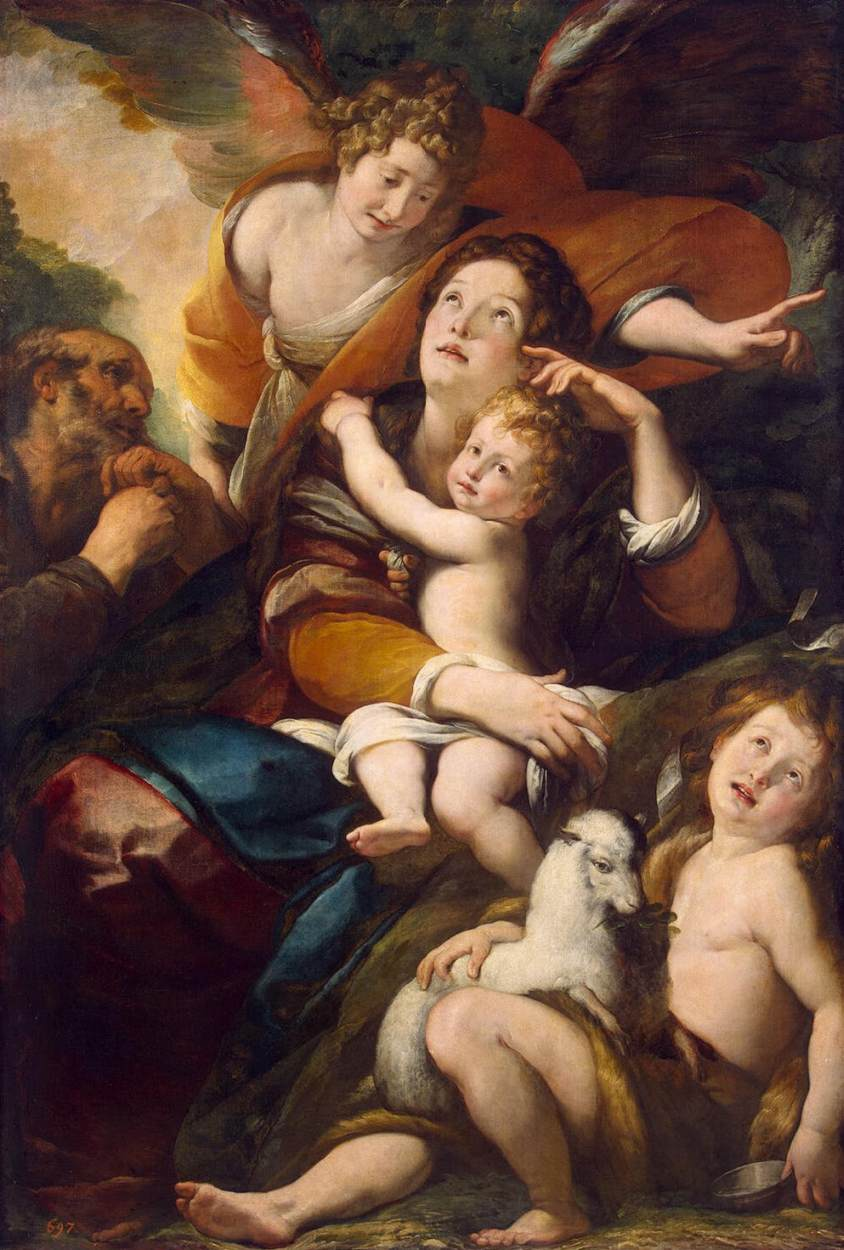
Holy Family with John the Baptist and an Angel, Hermitage Museum, Saint Petersburg

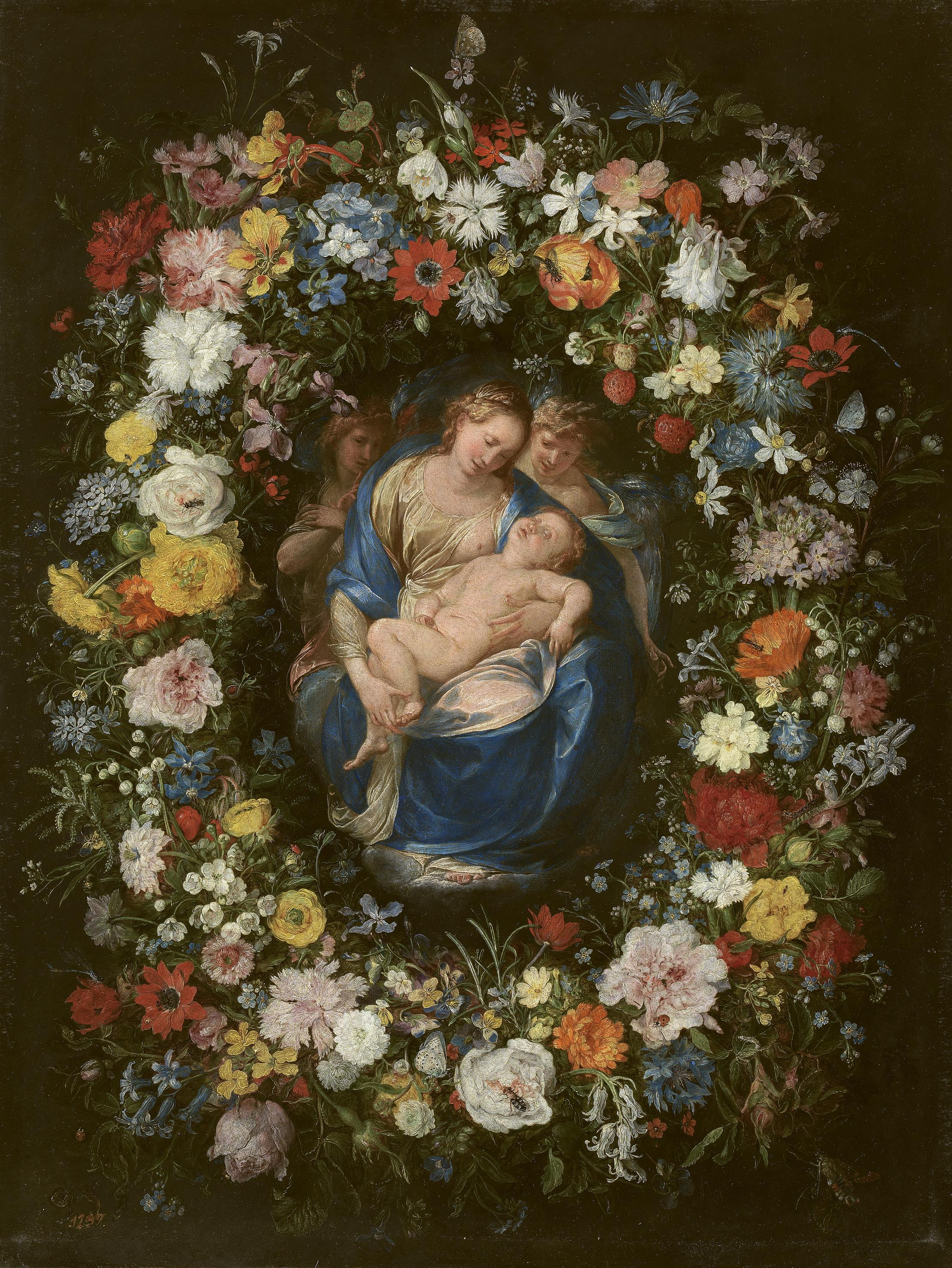
Garland with the Virgin and Child and two Angels, in collaboration with Jan Brueghel the Elder. c. 1619. Prado Museum, Madrid.

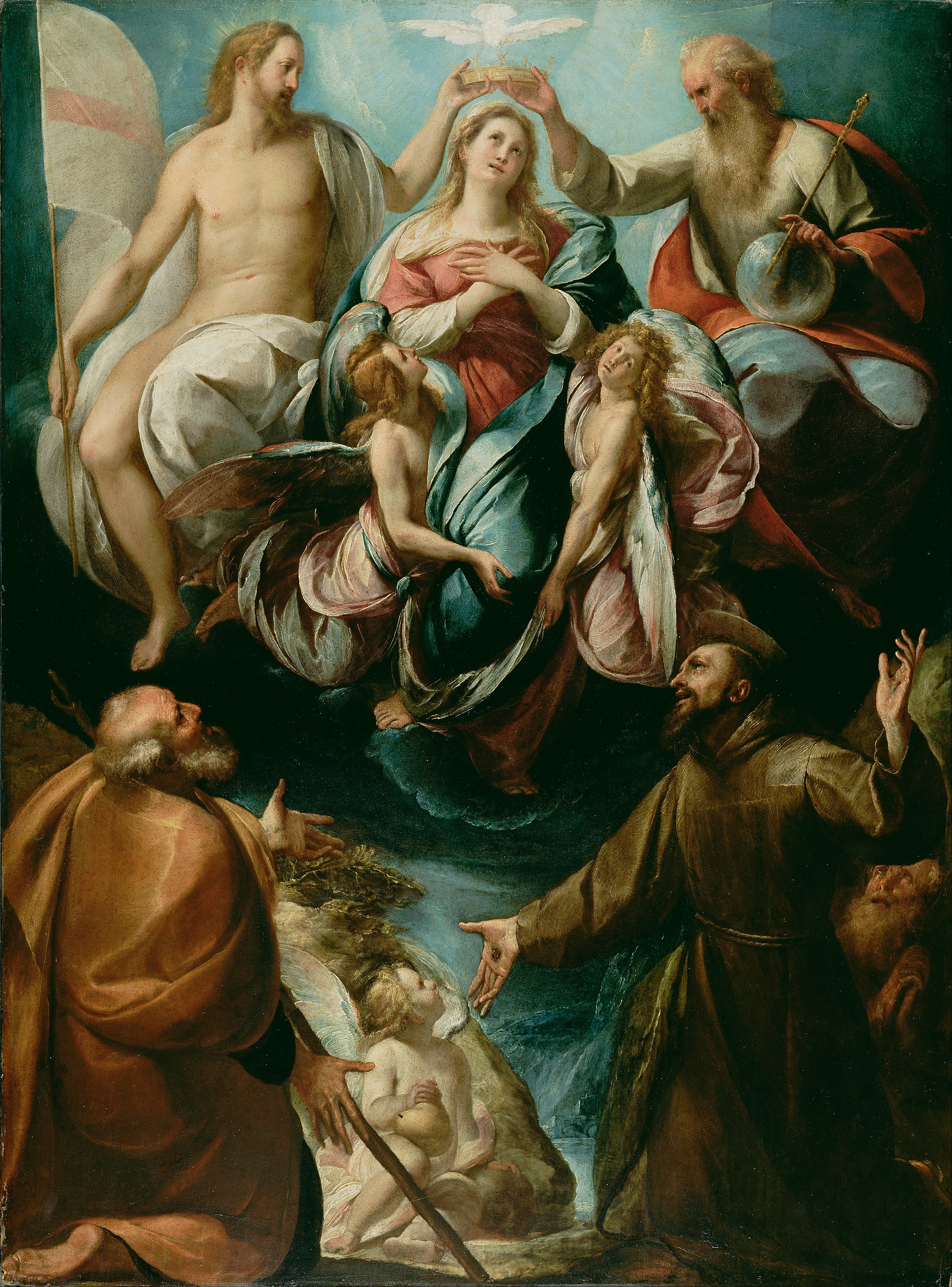
Coronation of the Virgin with Saints Joseph and Francis of Assisi, about 1604–1607, Getty Center, in Los Angeles

The Ecstasy of the Magdalen, National Gallery of Art, Washington, D.C.

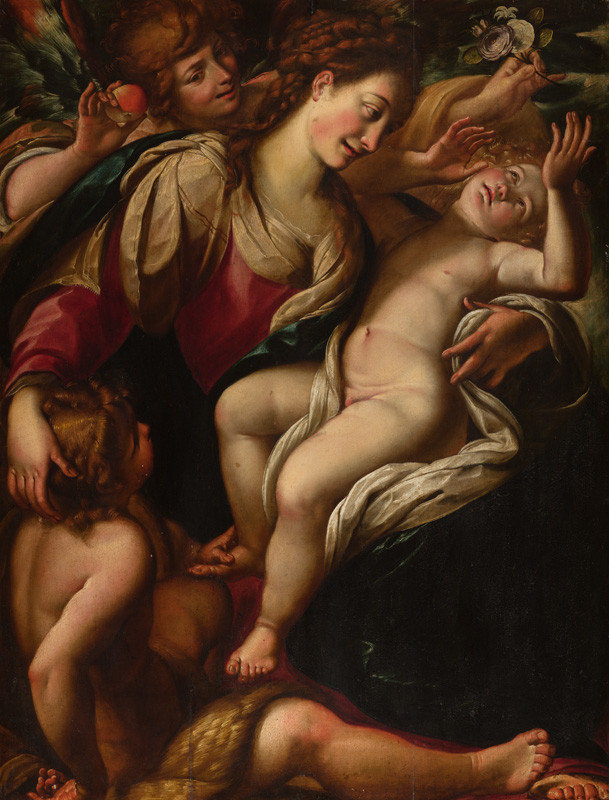
Virgin Mary with a child, little John the Baptist and an Angel, National Gallery Prague

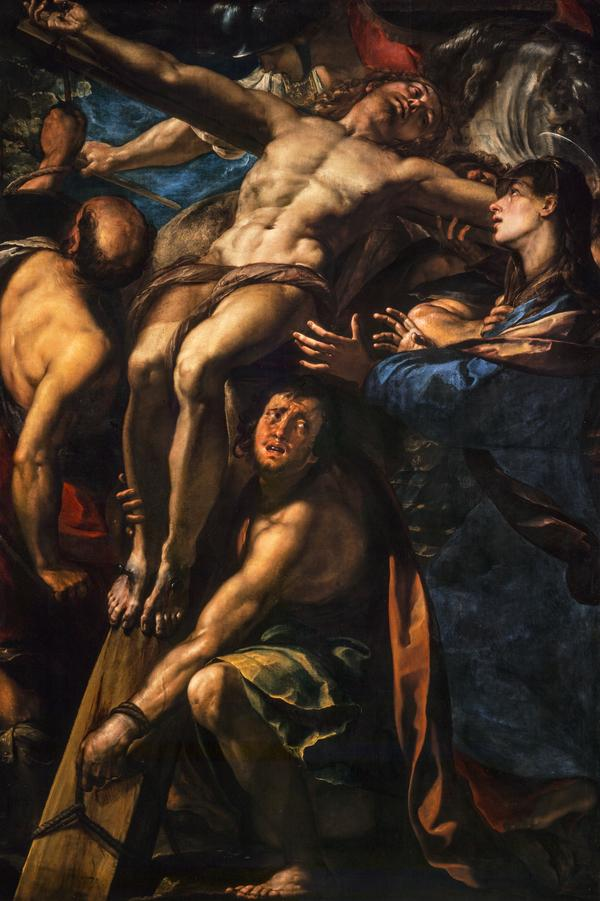
The Raising of the Cross, National Galleries of Scotland, Edinburg

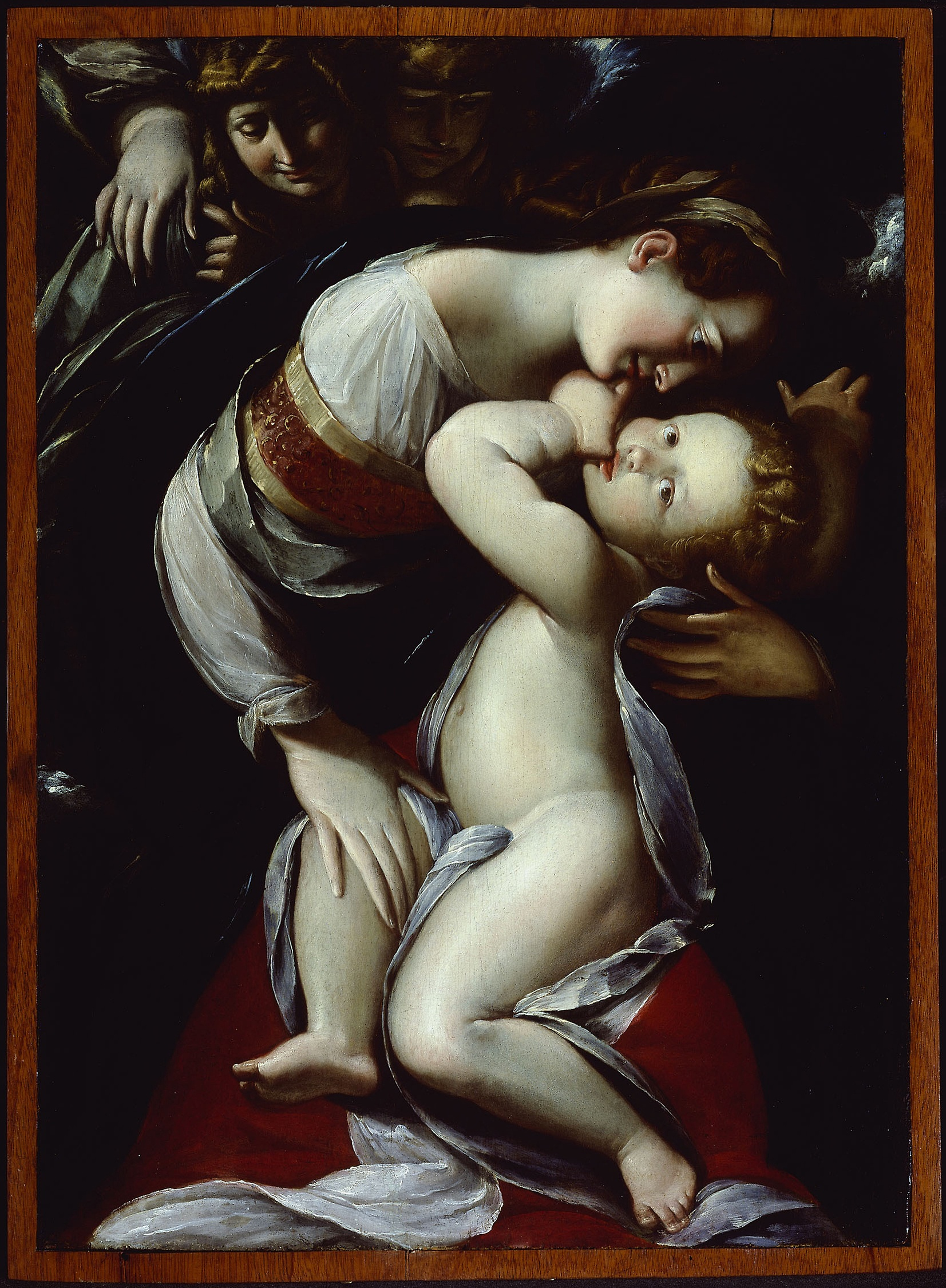
Virgin and Child with Angels, Art Institute of Chicago

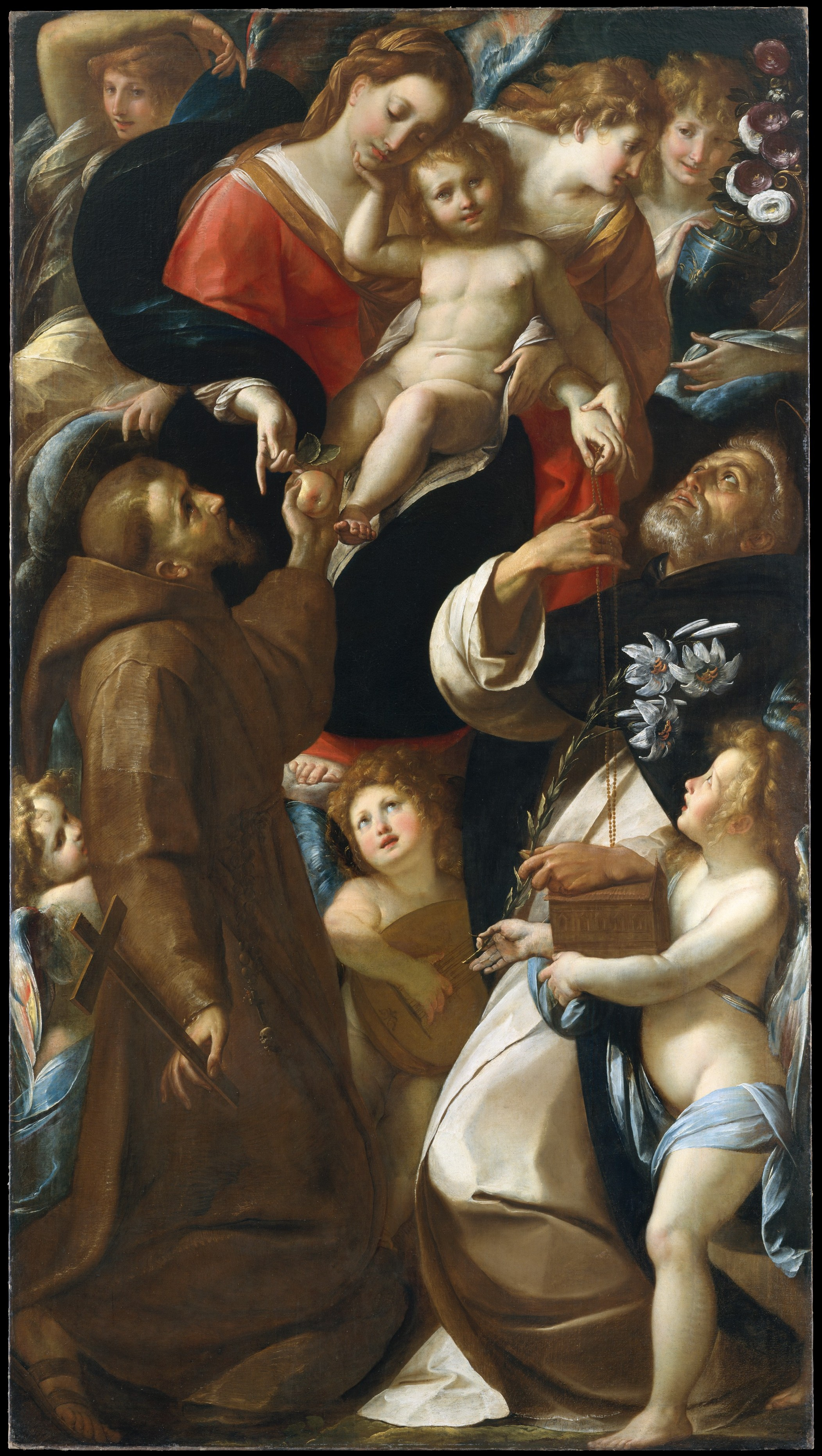
Madonna and Child with Saints Francis and Dominic and Angels, Metropolitan Museum of Art, New York

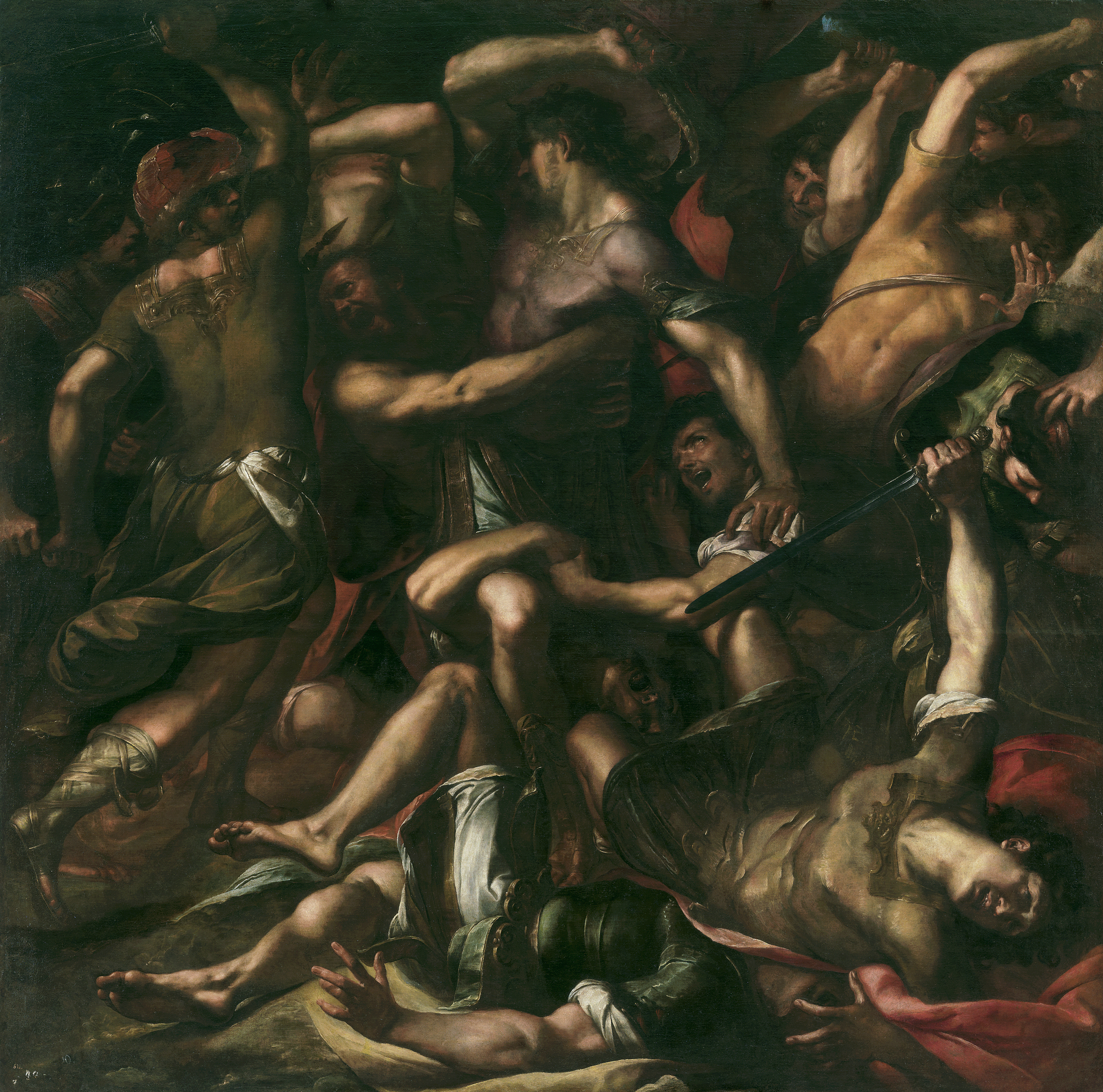
Samson and the Philistines, Museo del Prado, Madrid

== Bibliography ==
- Malvasia, Carlo Cesare (1678). "Di Ercole Procaccini e di Camillo, Giulio Cesare Carlo Antonio suoi figiuoli Ercole nipote Lorenzo Franchi discepolo et altri". Felsina pittrice (in Italian). Vol. 1. Bologna: per l'Erede di Domenico Barbieri. pp. 275–295.
- Pevsner, Nikolaus (1929). "Giulio Cesare Procaccini". Rivista d'Arte. 11: 321–54.
- Vigezzi, Silvio (1933). "I primi anni d'attività di Giulio Cesare Procaccini". Rivista d'Arte. 15: 483–7.
- Wittgens, Fernanda (1933). "Per la cronologia di Giulio Cesare Procaccini". Rivista d'Arte. 15: 35–64.
- Neilson, Nancy Ward (1972). "An Altarpiece by Giulio Cesare Procaccini and Some Further Remarks". Arte Lombarda. 17 (37): 22–25. JSTOR 43104917.
- Brigstocke, Hugh (1976). "Giulio Cesare Procaccini reconsidered". Jahrbuch der Berliner Museen. 18: 84–133. doi:10.2307/4125762. JSTOR 4125762.
- Neilson, Nancy Ward (1979). "By and about Giulio Cesare Procaccini". Master Drawings. 17 (3): 280–284+332–339. JSTOR 1553517.
- Wittkower, Rudolf (1993). "Art and Architecture Italy, 1600–1750". Pelican History of Art. 1980. Penguin Books Ltd. pp. 98–102.
- Procaccini exhibition.
- Domenico Sedini, Giulio Cesare Procaccini Archived 2021-08-17 at the Wayback Machine, online catalogue Artgate by Fondazione Cariplo, 2010, CC BY-SA.
