= Milan Cathedral =

Cathedral church of Milan, Italy

- Metropolitan Cathedral-Basilica of the Nativity of Saint Mary
- Cattedrale Metropolitana della Natività della Beata Vergine Maria (Italian)
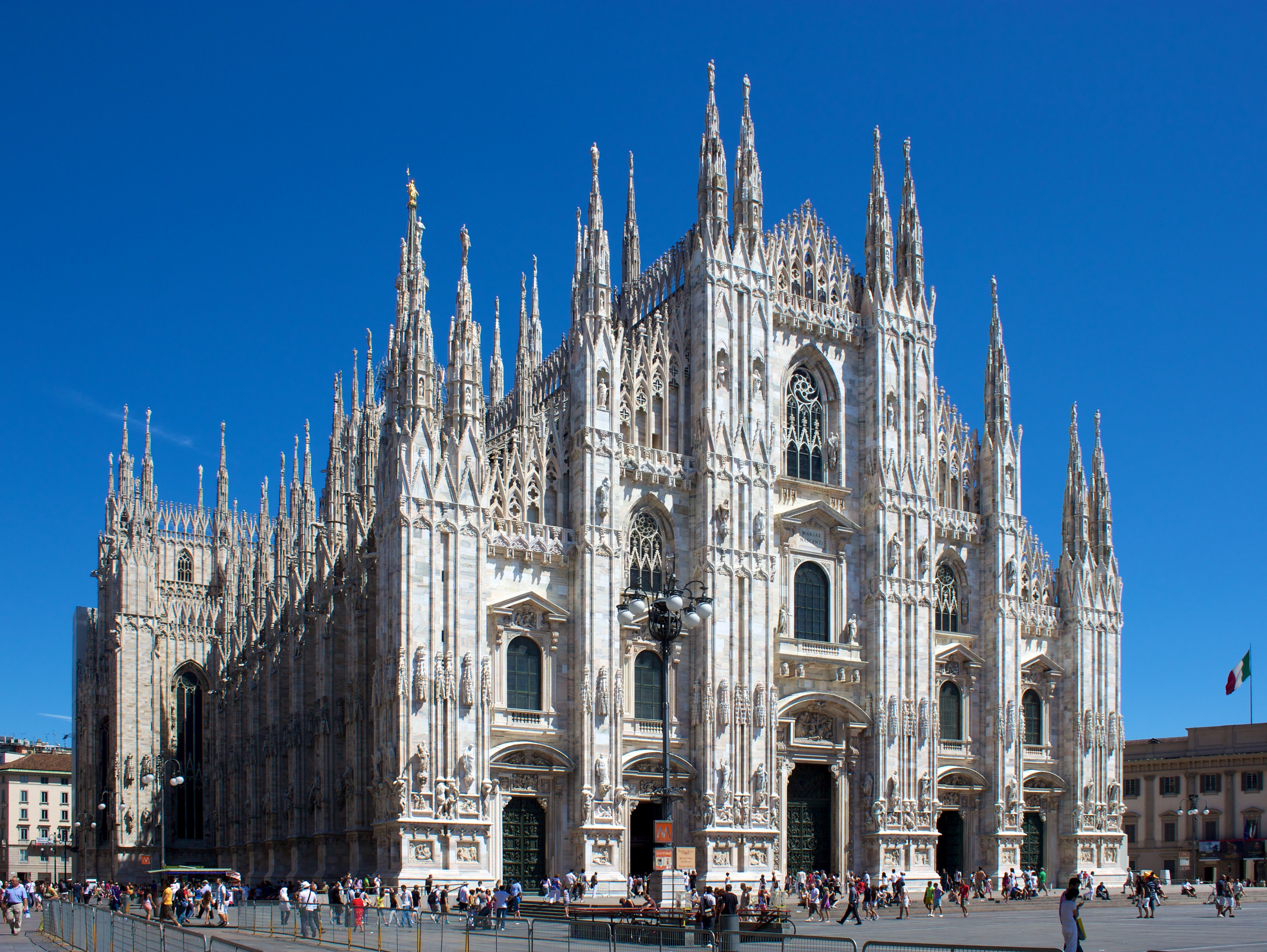
- Milan Cathedral from the Square

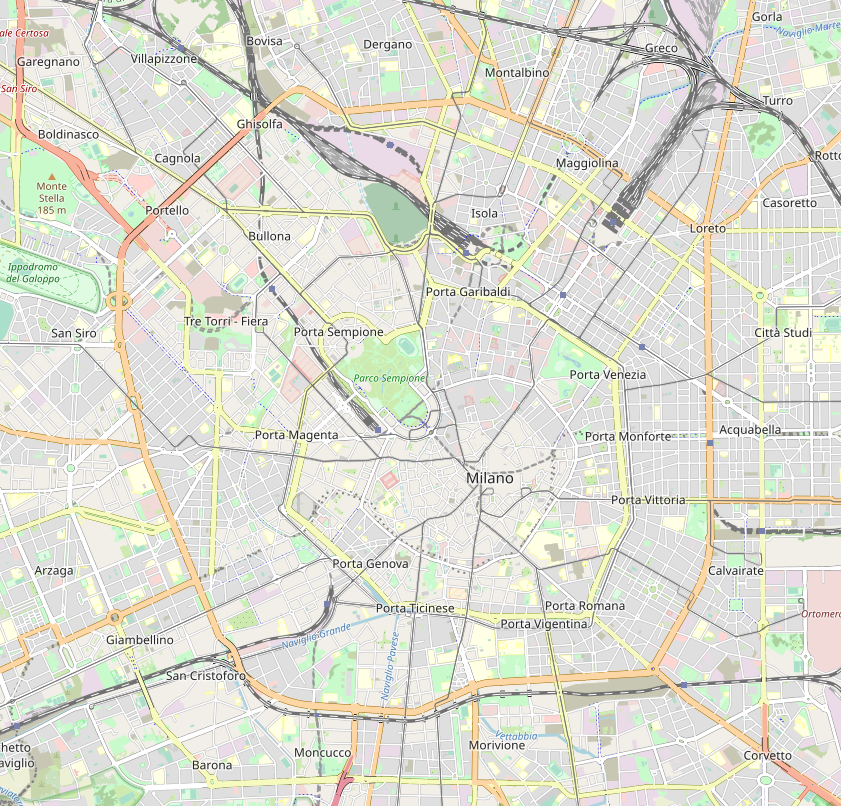
- Location in Milan
- 45°27′51″N 9°11′29″E
- Location: Via Carlo Maria Martini, 1; 20122 Milan
- Country: Italy
- Denomination: Catholic Church
- Sui iuris church: Latin Church
- Tradition: Ambrosian Rite
- Website: Milan Duomo

History
- Status: Cathedral, minor basilica

Architecture
- Functional status: Active
- Architect(s): Simone da Orsenigo et al.
- Style: Gothic, Renaissance architecture
- Groundbreaking: 1386 (original building)
- Completed: 1965

Specifications
- Capacity: 40,000
- Length: 158.6 metres (520 ft)
- Width: 92 metres (302 ft)
- Height: 108 metres (354 ft)
- Materials: Brick with Candoglia marble

Administration
- Archdiocese: Archdiocese of Milan

Clergy
- Archbishop: Mario Delpini

Milan Cathedral (Italian: Duomo di Milano [ˈdwɔːmo di miˈlaːno]; Milanese: Domm de Milan [ˈdɔm de miˈlãː]), or Metropolitan Cathedral-Basilica of the Nativity of Saint Mary (Italian: Cattedrale Metropolitana della Natività della Beata Vergine Maria), is the cathedral church of Milan, Lombardy, Italy. Dedicated to the Nativity of St. Mary (Santa Maria Nascente), it is the seat of the Archbishop of Milan, currently Archbishop Mario Delpini.

The cathedral took nearly six centuries to complete, beginning construction in 1386 and its final details completed in 1965. It is the largest church in the Italian Republic—the larger St. Peter's Basilica is in the State of Vatican City, a sovereign state—and one of the largest in the world.

== History ==
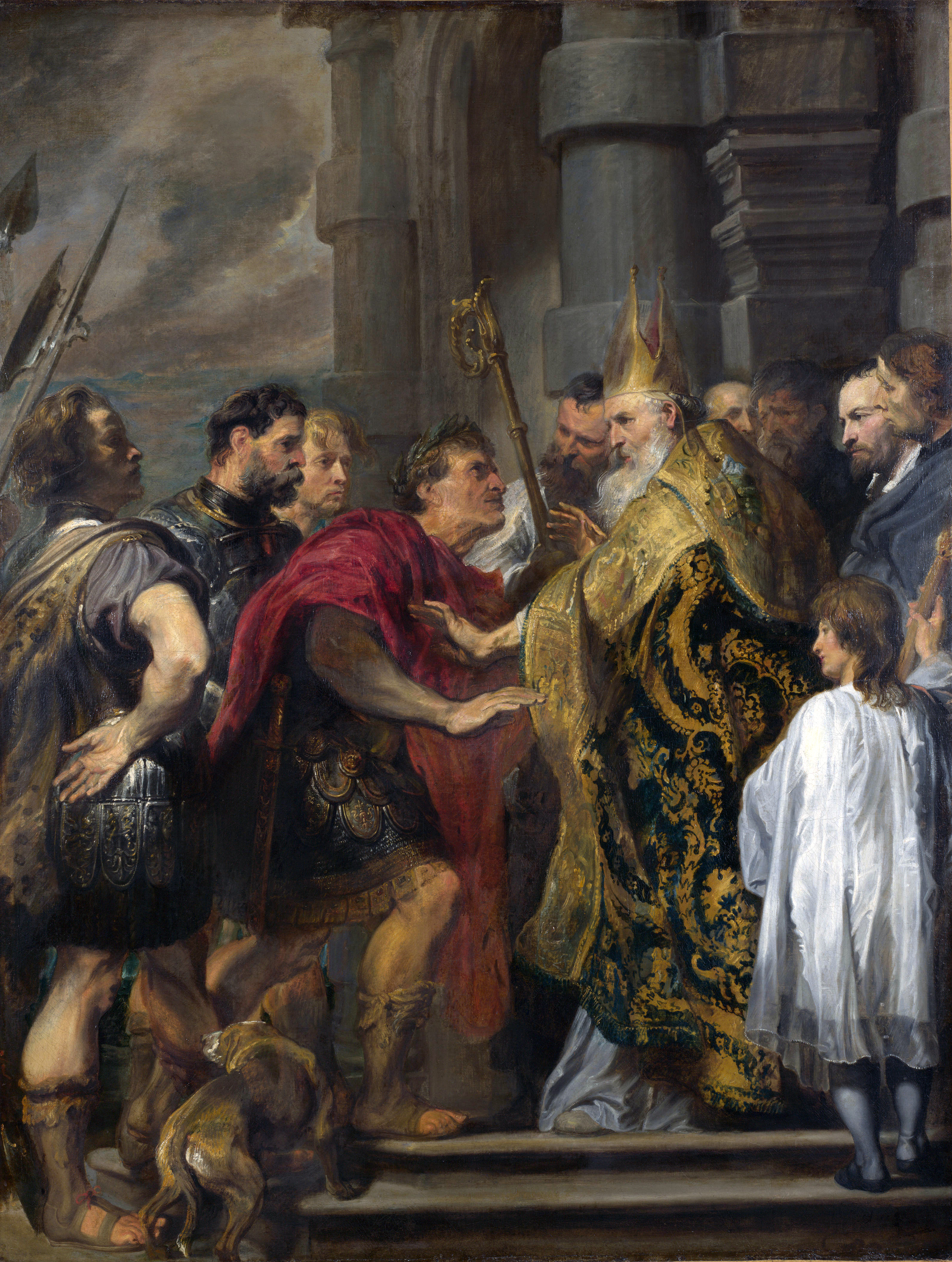
Saint Ambrose barring Theodosius from Milan Cathedral by Anthony van Dyck, c. 1619-1620

Milan's layout, with streets either radiating from the Duomo or circling it, reveals that the Duomo occupies what was the most central site in Roman Mediolanum, that of the public basilica facing the forum. The first cathedral, the "new basilica" (basilica nova) dedicated to St Thecla, was completed by 355. It seems to share, on a slightly smaller scale, the plan of the contemporaneous church recently rediscovered beneath Tower Hill in London. An adjoining basilica was erected in 836. The old octagonal baptistery, the Battistero Paleocristiano, dates to 335 and can be visited under the cathedral. When a fire damaged the cathedral and basilica in 1075, they were rebuilt as the Duomo.

=== Construction begins ===
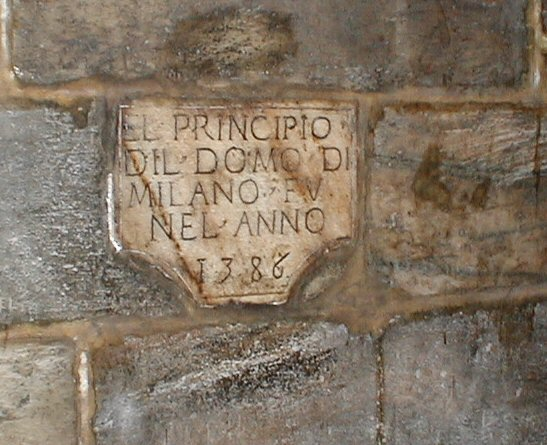
Plate celebrating the laying of the first stone in 1386

In 1386, Archbishop Antonio da Saluzzo began construction of the cathedral. The start of the construction coincided with the ascension to power in Milan of the archbishop's cousin Gian Galeazzo Visconti, and was meant as a reward to the noble and working classes, who had suffered under his tyrannical Visconti predecessor Barnabò. The construction of the cathedral was also dictated by very specific political deliberations: with the new construction site the population of Milan intending to emphasize the centrality of Milan in the eyes of Gian Galeazzo, a prominence questioned by the choice of the new lord to reside and maintain his court, like his father Galeazzo II, in Pavia and not in Milan. Before actual work began, three main buildings were demolished: the palace of the Archbishop, the Ordinari Palace and the Baptistry of St. Stephen at the Spring, while the old church of Sta. Maria Maggiore was exploited as a stone quarry. Enthusiasm for the immense new building soon spread among the population, and the shrewd Gian Galeazzo, together with his cousin the archbishop, collected large donations for the work-in-progress. The construction program was strictly regulated under the "Fabbrica del Duomo", which had 300 employees led by first chief engineer Simone da Orsenigo. Orsenigo initially planned to build the cathedral from brick in Lombard Gothic style.

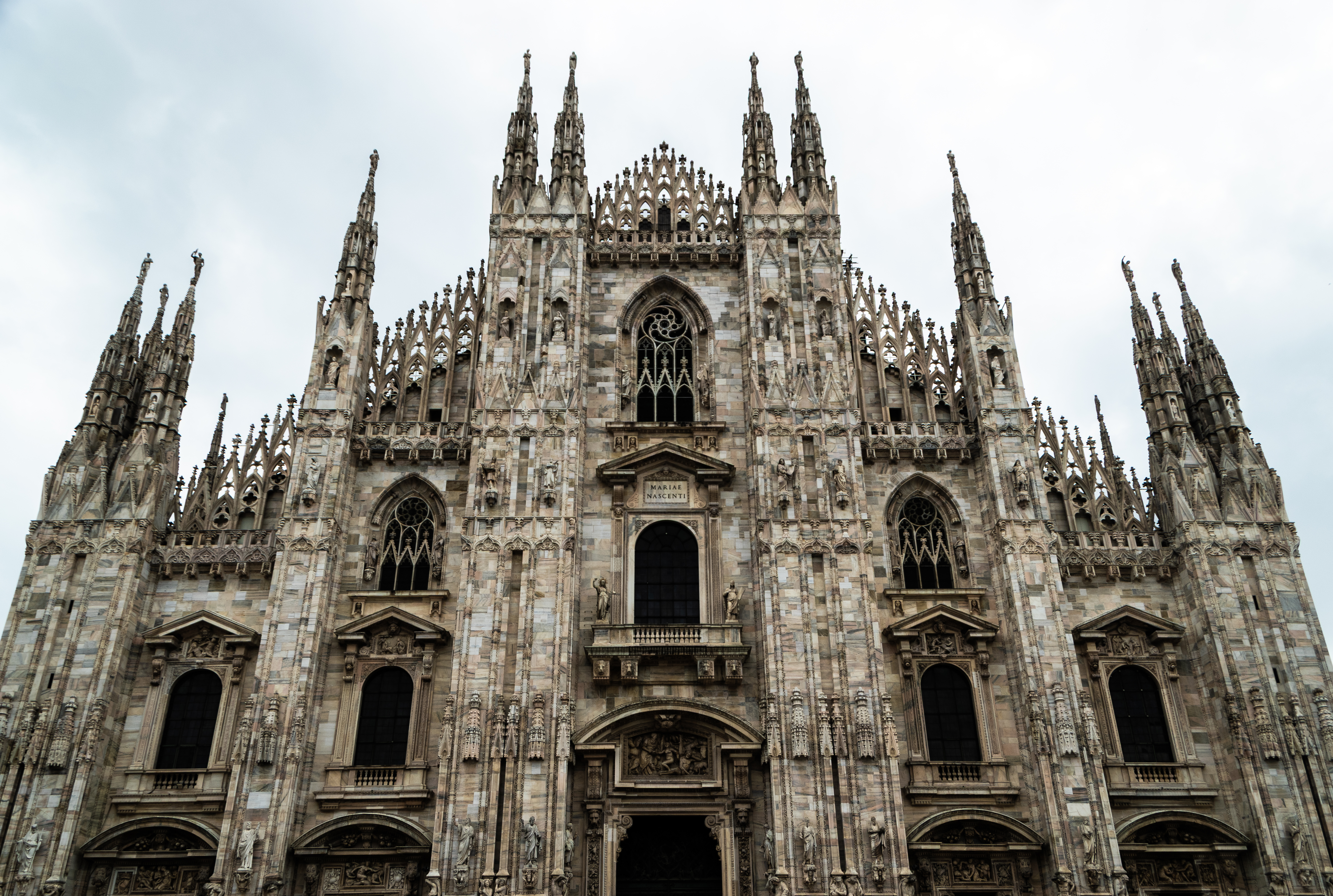
Milan Cathedral, front façade

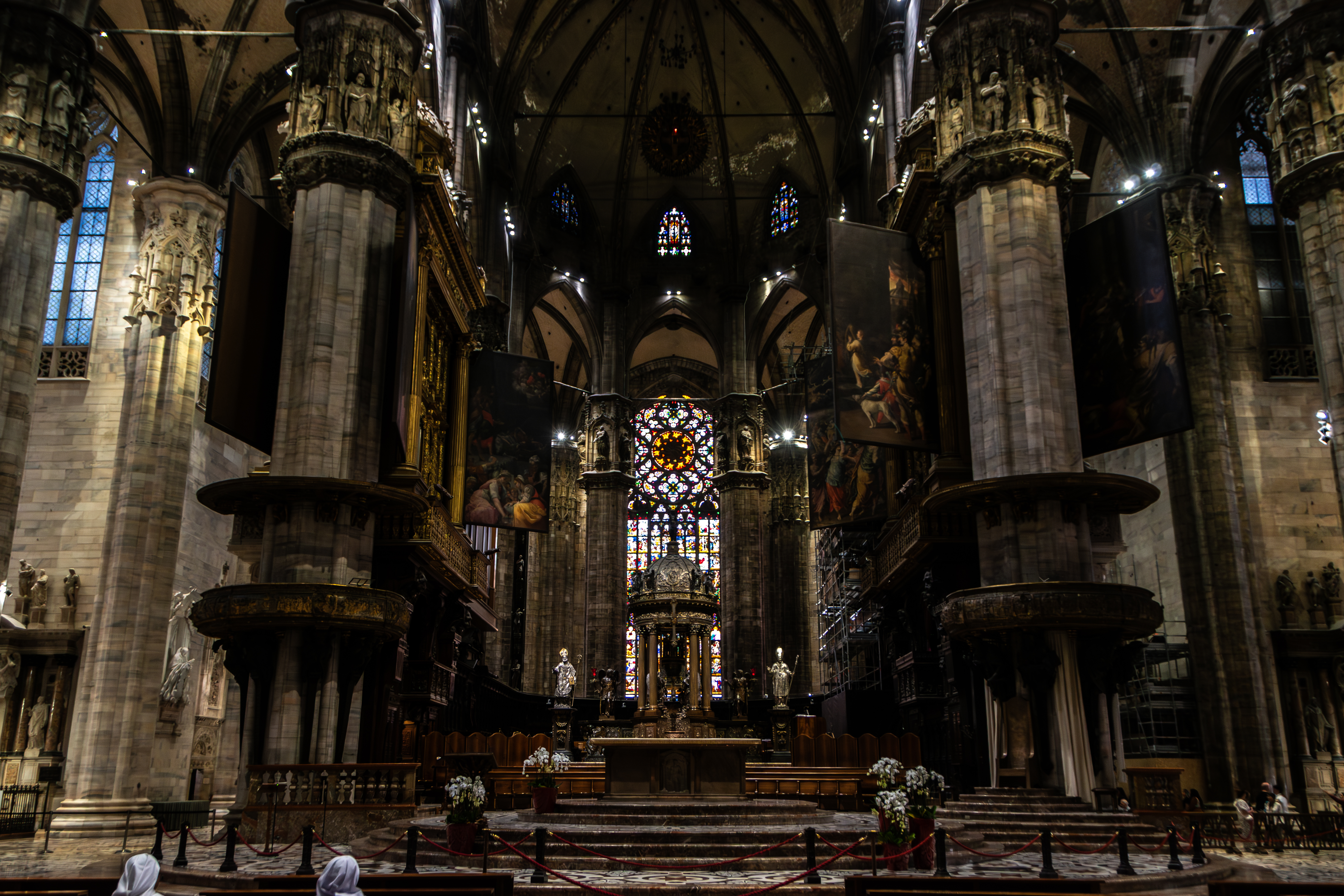
Chancel and altar

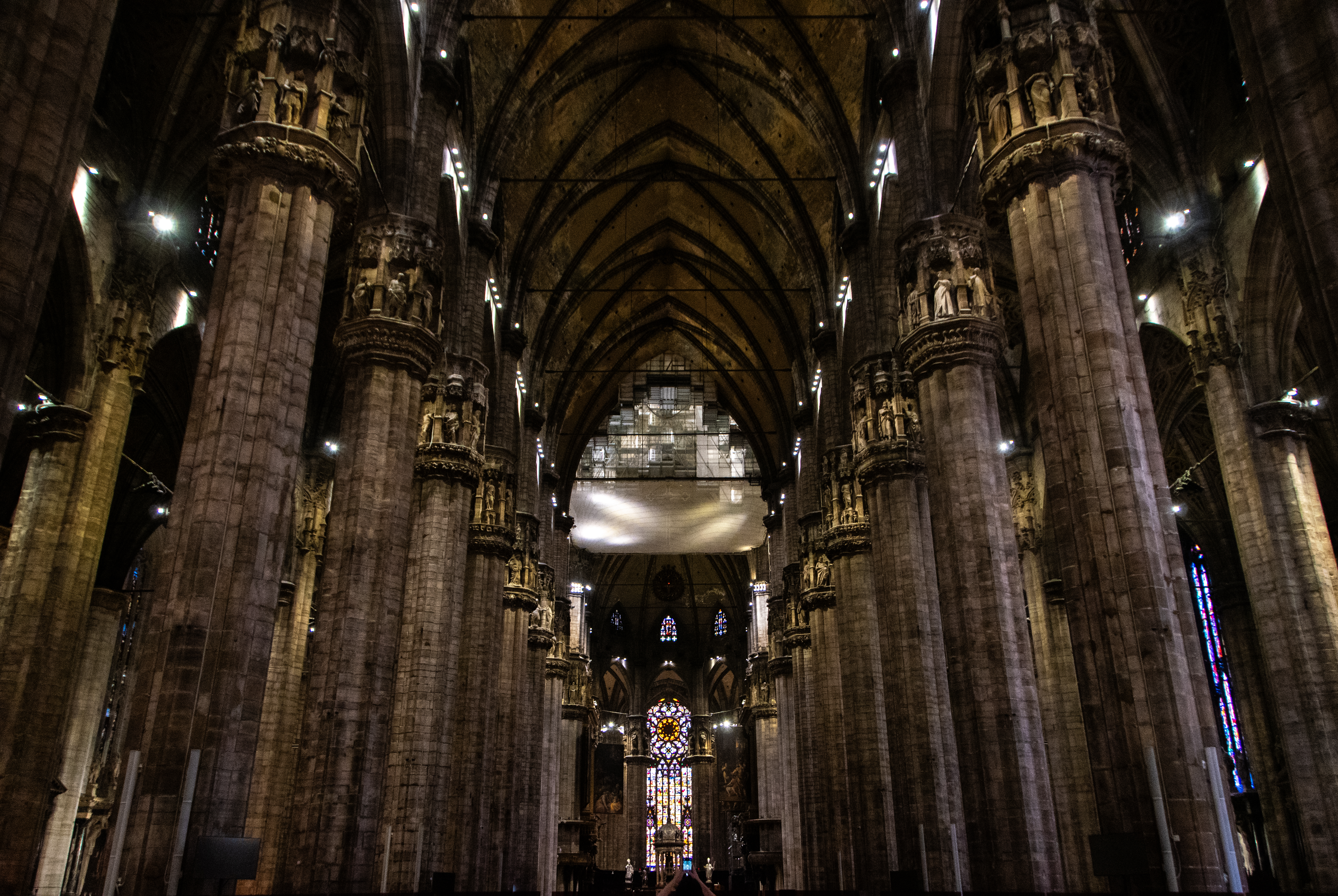
Nave of the cathedral

Visconti had ambitions to follow the newest trends in European architecture. In 1389, a French chief engineer, Nicolas de Bonaventure, was appointed, adding to the church its Rayonnant Gothic. Galeazzo gave the Fabbrica del Duomo exclusive use of the marble from the Candoglia quarry and exempted it from taxes. Ten years later another French architect, Jean Mignot, was called from Paris to judge and improve upon the work done, as the masons needed new technical aid to lift stones to an unprecedented height. Mignot declared all the work done up until then as in pericolo di ruina ("peril of ruin"), as it had been done sine scienzia ("without science"). In the following years, Mignot's forecasts proved untrue, but they spurred Galeazzo's engineers to improve their instruments and techniques. However, relations between Gian Galeazzo and the top management of the factory (chosen by the citizens of Milan) were often tense: the lord (who in 1395 had become Duke of Milan) intended to transform the cathedral into the dynastic mausoleum of the Visconti, inserting the central part of the cathedral funeral monument of his father Galeazzo II; this was met with strong opposition from both the factory and the Milanese, who wanted to underline their autonomy. A clash arose, which forced Gian Galeazzo to decide on the foundation of a new construction site intended exclusively for the Visconti dynasty: the Certosa di Pavia. Work proceeded quickly, and at the death of Gian Galeazzo in 1402, almost half the cathedral was complete. Construction, however, stalled almost totally until 1480, for lack of money and ideas: the most notable works of this period were the tombs of Marco Carelli and Pope Martin V (1424) and the windows of the apse (1470s), of which those extant portray St. John the Evangelist, by Cristoforo de' Mottis, and Saint Eligius and San John of Damascus, both by Niccolò da Varallo. In 1452, under Francesco Sforza, the nave and the aisles were completed up to the sixth bay.

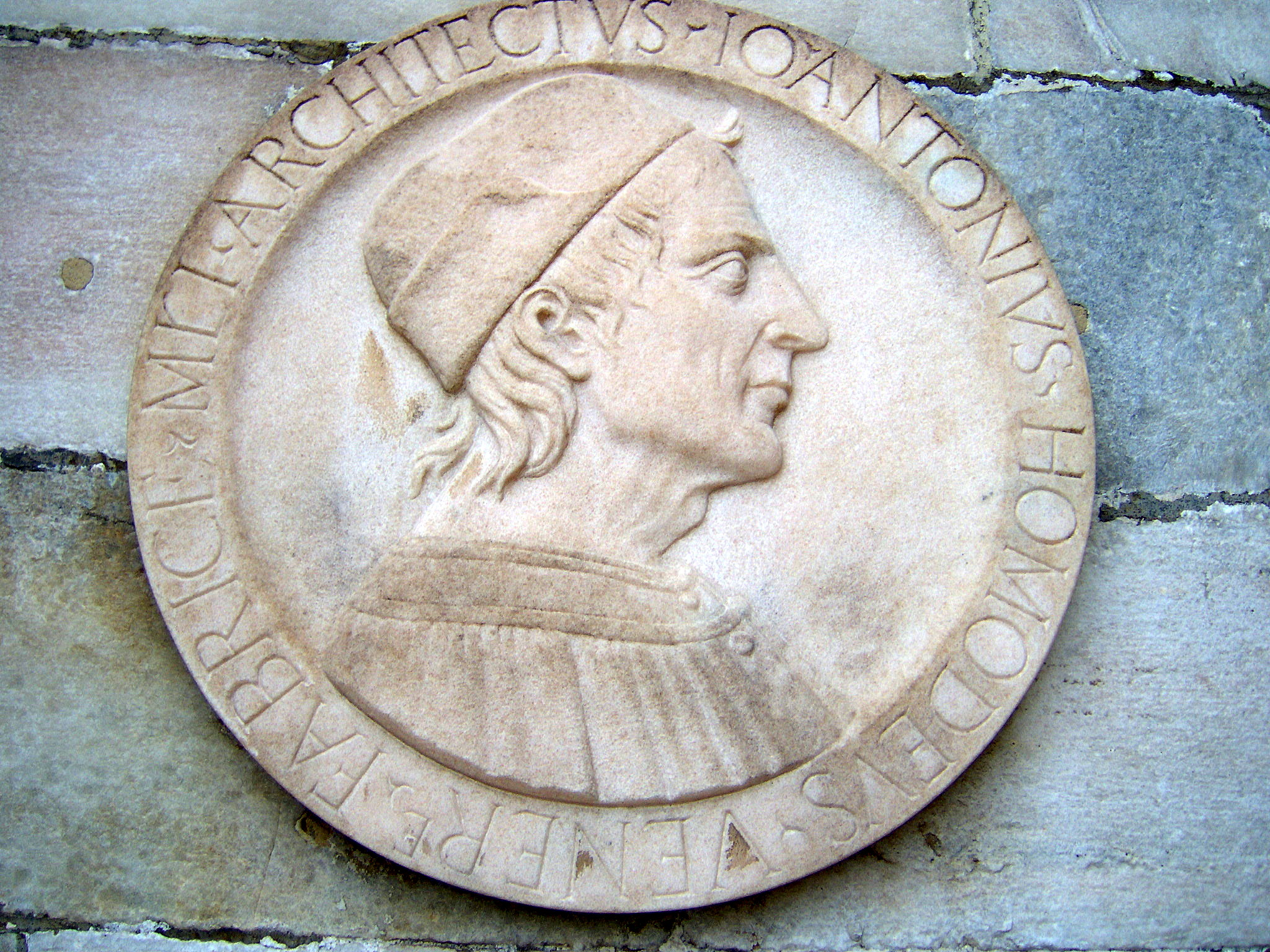
Giovanni Antonio Amadeo on "Amadeo's Little Spire"

In 1488, both Leonardo da Vinci and Donato Bramante created models in a competition to design the central cupola; Leonardo later withdrew his submission. From 1500 to 1510, under Ludovico Sforza, the octagonal cupola was completed, and decorated in the interior with four series of 15 statues each, portraying saints, prophets, sibyls and other Figures from the Bible. The exterior long remained without any decoration, except for the Guglietto dell'Amadeo ("Amadeo's Little Spire"), constructed 1507–1510. This is a Renaissance masterwork which nevertheless harmonized well with the general Gothic appearance of the church.

During the subsequent Spanish domination, the new church proved usable, even though the interior remained largely unfinished, and some bays of the nave and the transepts were still missing. In 1552, Giacomo Antegnati was commissioned to build a large organ for the north side of the choir, and Giuseppe Meda provided four of the sixteen reliefs which were to decorate the altar area (the program was completed by Federico Borromeo). In 1562, Marco d'Agrate's St. Bartholomew and the famous Trivulzio candelabrum (12th century) were added.

=== Borromeo ===
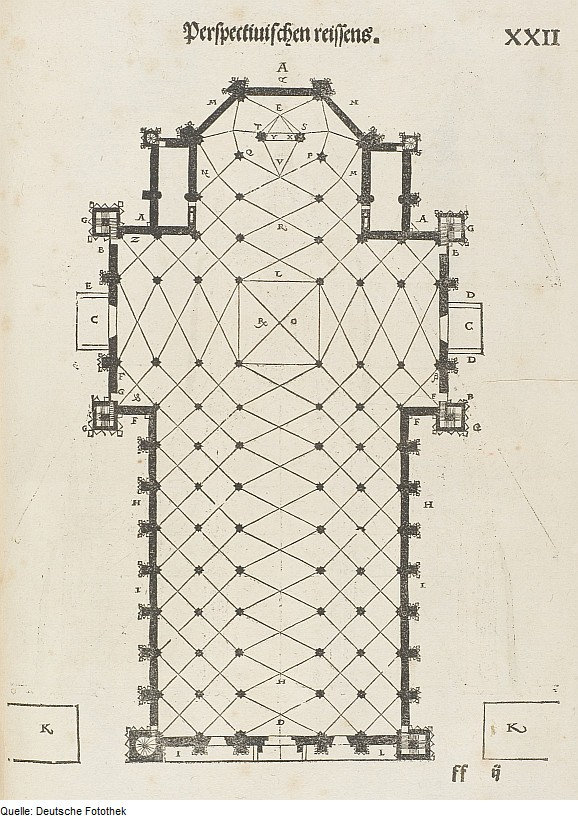
Plan of the Cathedral in the 16th century

After the accession of Carlo Borromeo to the archbishop's throne, all lay monuments were removed from the Duomo. These included the tombs of Giovanni, and Filippo Maria Visconti, Francesco I and his wife Bianca, Galeazzo Maria, which were brought to unknown destinations. However, Borromeo's main intervention was the appointment, in 1571, of Pellegrino Pellegrini as chief engineer— a contentious move, since to appoint Pellegrino, who was not a lay brother of the duomo, required a revision of the Fabbrica's statutes.

Borromeo and Pellegrini strove for a new, Renaissance appearance for the cathedral, that would emphasise its Roman / Italian nature, and subdue the Gothic style, which was now seen as foreign. As the façade still was largely incomplete, Pellegrini designed a "Roman" style one, with columns, obelisks and a large tympanum. When Pellegrini's design was revealed, a competition for the design of the façade was announced, and this elicited nearly a dozen entries, including one by Antonio Barca.

This design was never carried out, but the interior decoration continued: in 1575–1585 the presbytery was rebuilt, while new altars and the baptistry were added. The wooden choir stalls were constructed by 1614 for the main altar by Francesco Brambilla. In 1577, Borromeo finally consecrated the whole edifice as a new church, distinct from the old Santa Maria Maggiore and Santa Tecla (which had been unified in 1549 after heavy disputes).

=== 17th and 18th centuries ===
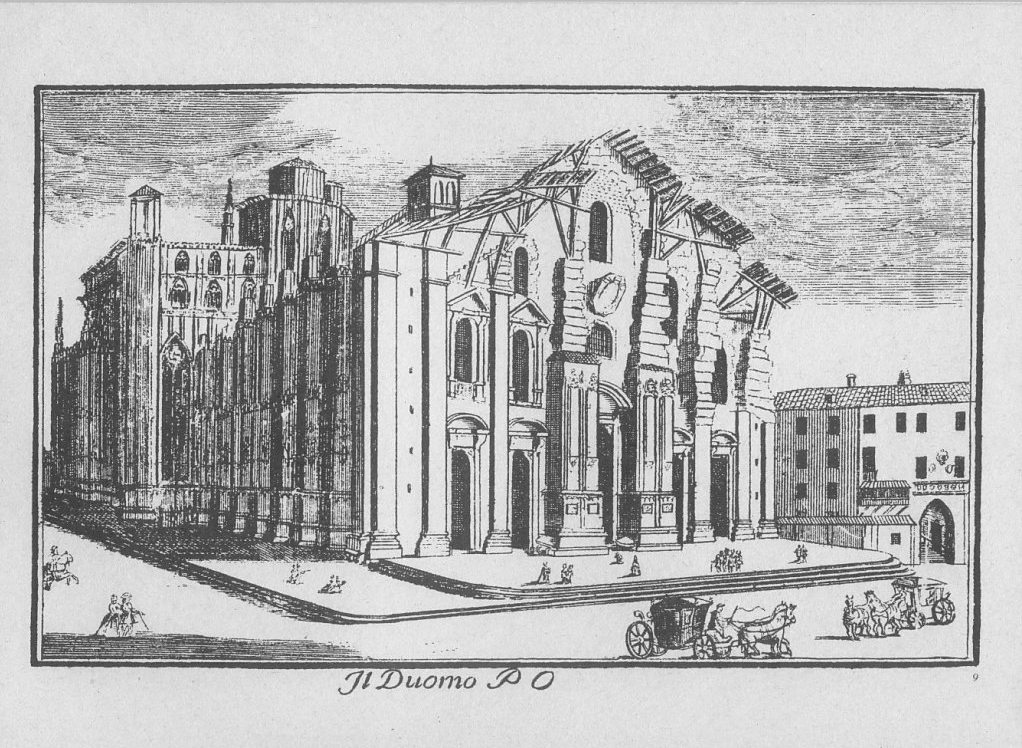
The cathedral as it appeared in 1745

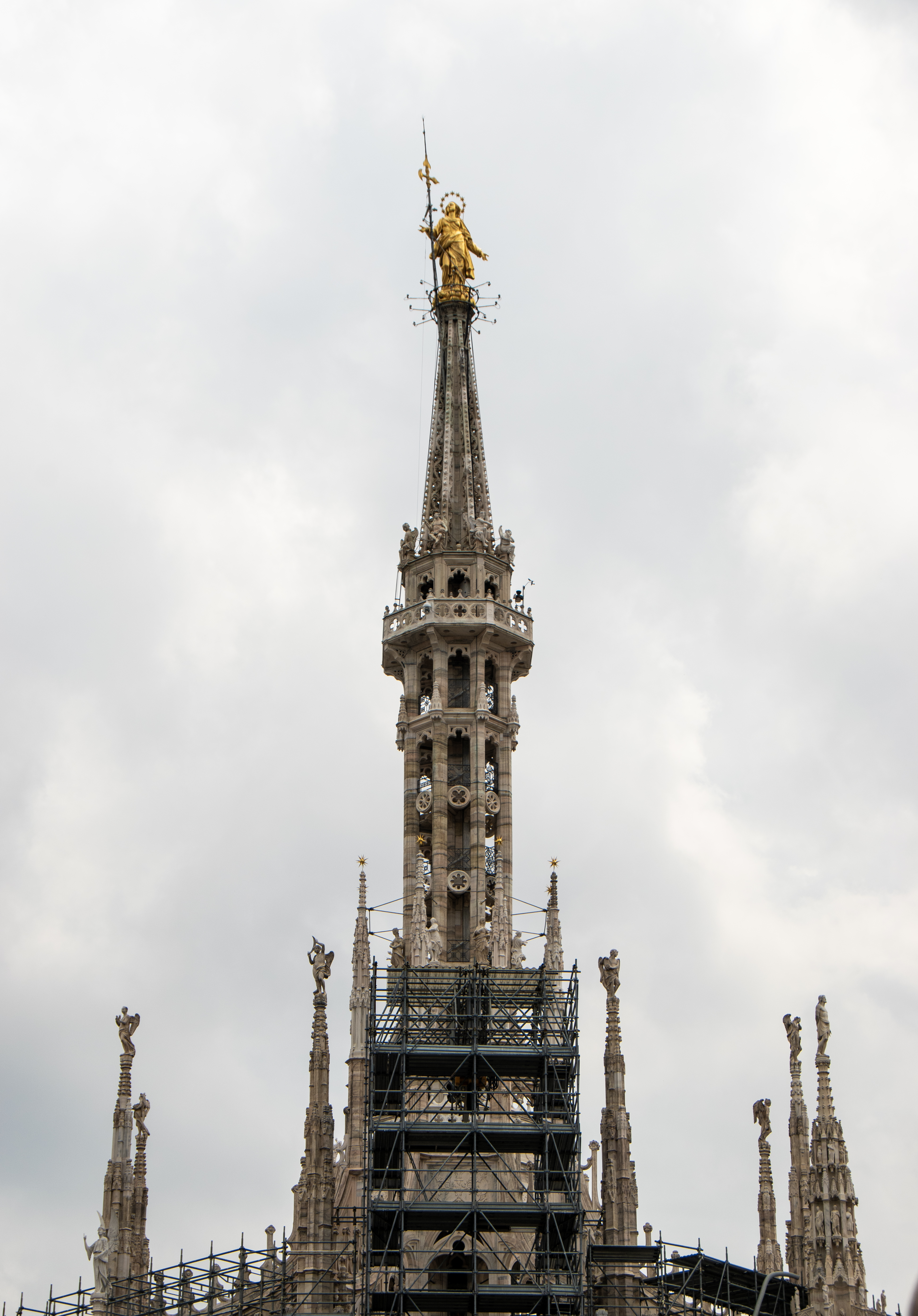
Madonnina's Spire, 2025

At the beginning of the 17th century, Federico Borromeo had the foundations of the new façade laid by Francesco Maria Richini and Fabio Mangone. Work continued until 1638 with the construction of five portals and two middle windows. In 1649, however, the new chief architect Carlo Buzzi introduced a striking revolution: the façade was to revert to the original Gothic style, including the already finished details within big Gothic pilasters and two giant belfries. Other designs were provided by, among others, Filippo Juvarra (1733) and Luigi Vanvitelli (1745), but all remained unapplied. In 1682 the façade of Santa Maria Maggiore was demolished and the cathedral's roof covering was completed.

In 1762, one of the main features of the cathedral, the Madonnina's spire, was erected at a height of 108.5 m. The spire was designed by Carlo Pellicani and is topped by the polychrome Madonnina statue, designed by Giuseppe Perego. Given Milan's damp and foggy climate, the Milanese consider it a fair-weather day when the Madonnina is visible from a distance, as it is so often covered by mist.

=== Completion ===
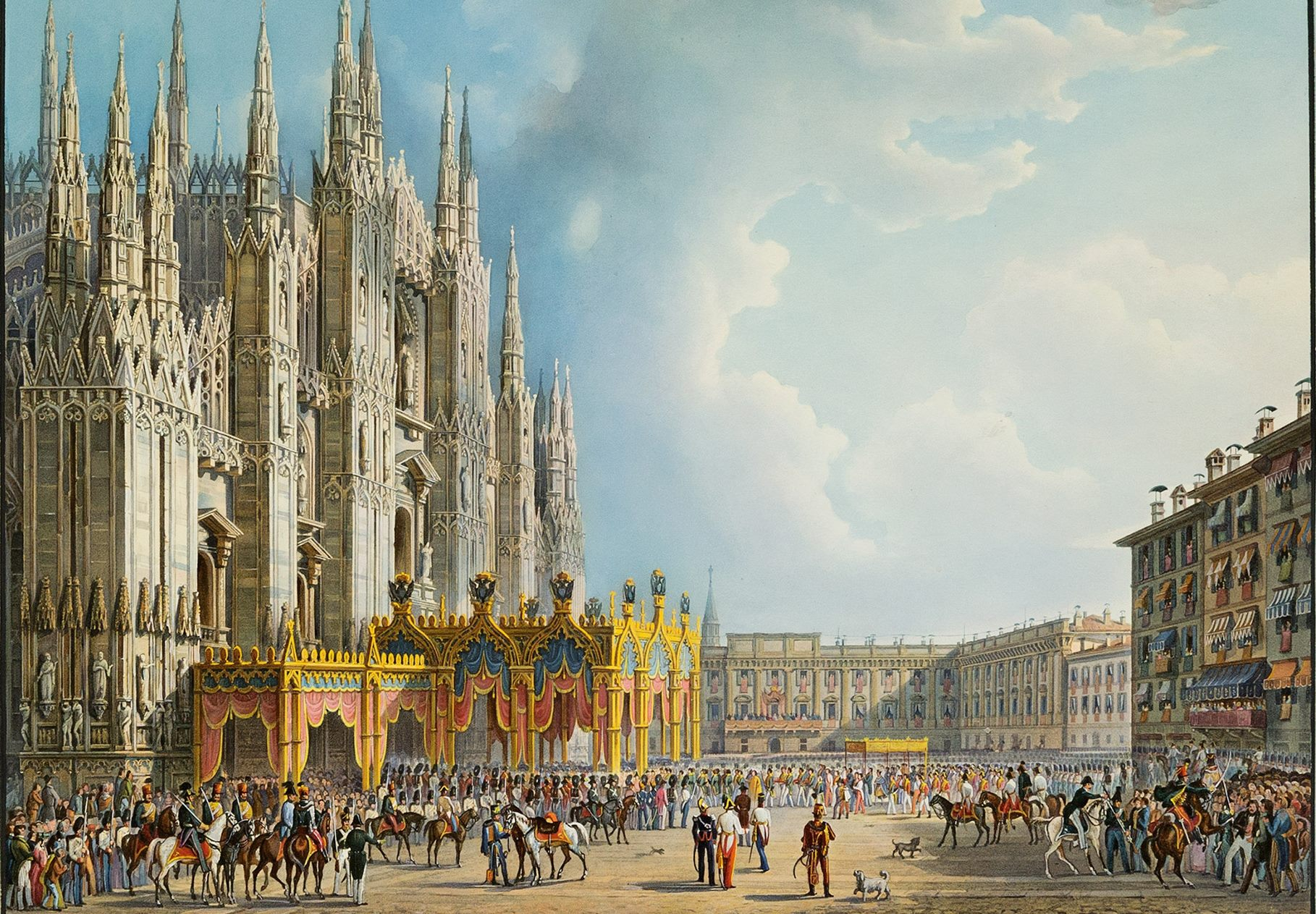
Design for the crowning of Ferdinand I of Austria at the Duomo in 1838, by Alessandro Sanquirico

On 20 May 1805, Napoleon Bonaparte, about to be crowned King of Italy, ordered the façade to be finished by Pellicani. In his enthusiasm, he assured that all expenses would fall to the French treasurer, who would reimburse the Fabbrica for the real estate it had to sell. Even though this reimbursement was never paid, it still meant that finally, within only seven years, the cathedral's façade was completed. Pellicani largely followed Buzzi's project, adding some neo-Gothic details to the upper windows. As a form of thanksgiving, a statue of Napoleon was placed at the top of one of the spires. Napoleon was crowned King of Italy at the Duomo.

In the following years, most of the missing arches and spires were constructed. The statues on the southern wall were also finished, while in 1829–1858, new stained glass windows replaced the old ones, though with less aesthetically significant results. The last details of the cathedral were finished only in the 20th century: the last portal was inaugurated on 6 January 1965. This date is considered the very end of a process which had proceeded for generations, although even now, some uncarved blocks remain to be completed as statues. The Allied bombing of Milan in World War II further delayed construction. Like many other cathedrals in cities bombed by the Allied forces, the Duomo suffered some damage, although to a lesser degree compared to other major buildings in the vicinity such as the La Scala Theatre. It was quickly repaired and became a place of solace and gathering for displaced local residents.

The Duomo's main façade went under renovation from 2003 to early 2009: as of February 2009, it had been completely uncovered, showing again the colours of the Candoglia marble.

In November 2012, officials announced a campaign to raise funds for the cathedral's preservation by asking patrons to adopt the building's spires. The effects of pollution on the 14th-century building entail regular maintenance, and recent austerity cuts to Italy's cultural budget have left less money for the upkeep of cultural institutions, including the cathedral. To help make up funds, Duomo management launched a campaign offering its 135 spires up for "adoption". Donors who contribute €100,000 (about $110,505) or more will have a plaque with their name engraved on it placed on the spire.

=== Architects and engineers ===
- 1387 Simone da Orsenigo
- 1387 Zeno da Campione
- 1387 Marco da Campione detto da Frixono
- 1389 Giacomo da Campione
- 1389 Nicola Bonaventura o da Benaventis di Francia
- 1389 Stefanino o Tavannino di Castelseprio
- 1391 Giovanni Fernach di Frimburgo
- 1391 Giovannino de Grassi
- 1391 Lorenzo degli Spazii da Campione o di Laino
- 1391 Marco da Carona
- 1391 Enrico di Gamodia (Gmüden)
- 1394 Beltramo da Conigo
- 1394 Ulrico Füssingen di Ulma
- 1398 Salomone de Grassi
- 1399 Antonio o Antonino da Paderno
- 1399 Gasparino da Carona
- 1399 Giacomolo da Venezia di Parigi
- 1399 Giovanni Mignoto
- 1399 Giovanni Cona o Cova di Bruges
- 1399 Arasmino de Sirtori
- 1400 Filippo degli Organi
- 1401 Polino da Orsenigo
- 1404 Antonio da Paderno
- 1406 Cristoforo de Chiona
- 1407 Leonardo da Sirtori
- 1409 Giovanni Magatto
- 1415 Antonio da Muggiò
- 1416 Bartolomeo di Modena
- 1420 Antonio da Gorgonzola
- 1430 Franceschino da Cannobio
- 1451 Giorgio degli Organi da Modena
- 1451 Giovanni Solari
- 1452 Antonio da Firenze detto il Filarete
- 1458 Donato de Sirtori
- 1459 Boniforte o Guinforte Solari
- 1476 Pietro Antonio Solari
- 1483 Giovanni Nexemperger di Graz
- 1486 Giovanni Antonio Amadeo
- 1490 Gian Giacomo Dolcebuono
- 1506 Cristoforo Solari detto il Gobbo
- 1512 Gerolamo della Porta
- 1519 Bernardo Zenale di Treviglio
- 1524 Giangiacomo della Porta
- 1526 Cristoforo Lombardo
- 1539 Baldassarre Vianelli
- 1547 Vincenzo da Seregno o Seregni
- 1567 Pellegrino Pellegrini, called il Tibaldi
- 1587 Martino Bassi
- 1591 Lelio Buzzi
- 1598 Aurelio Trezzi
- 1609 Alessandro Bisnato
- 1617 Fabio Mangone
- 1617 Giovanni Paolo Bisnato
- 1631 Francesco Maria Ricchino
- 1638 Carlo Buzzio o Buzzi
- 1658 Girolamo Quadrio
- 1679 Andrea Biffi
- 1686 Giambattista Quadrio
- 1723 Antonio Quadrio
- 1743 Bartolomeo Bolla o Bolli
- 1760 Francesco Croce
- 1773 Giulio Galliori
- 1795 Felice Soave
- 1801 Giovanni Antonio Antolini
- 1803 Leopoldo Pollak
- 1806 Giuseppe Zanoja
- 1806 Giuseppe Pollak
- 1806 Carlo Amati
- 1813 Pietro Pestagalli
- 1854–1860 Office vacant
- 1861 Giuseppe Vandoni
- 1877 Paolo Cesa-Bianchi
- 1904 Gaetano Moretti
- 1907 Luca Beltrami
- 1912 Adolfo Zacchi
- 1963 Antonio Cassi Ramelli
- 1964 Carlo Ferrari da Passano
- 1988 Benigno Mörlin Visconti Castiglione

== Architecture and art ==
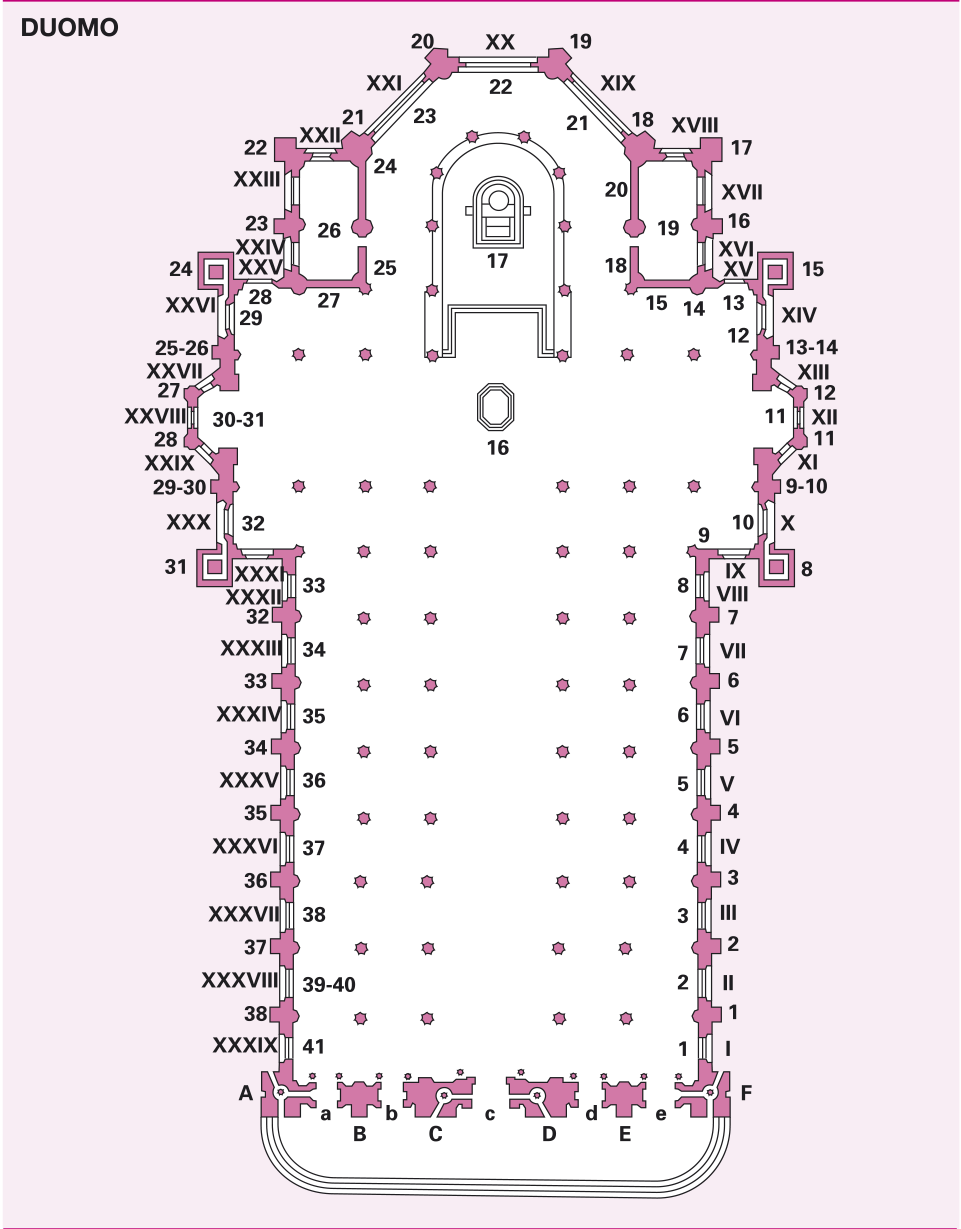
Plan of the Milan Cathedral. Uppercase letters from A to E indicate the buttresses, lowercase letters from a to e indicate the portals. Roman numerals I to XXXIX indicate the windows, Arabic numerals 1 to 41 indicate the buttresses, statues are marked with lowercase letters. (I) Stained glass with stories of St. John the Evangelist, (V) Stained glass with stories of the New Testament, (9) Funerary monument of Gian Giacomo Medici, (18) Portal of the southern sacristy, (20) Statue of Martin V by Jacopino da Tradate, (25) Portal by Giacomo da Campione, (XXV) Stained glass with stories of St. John of Damascus, (30) Chapel of Madonna dell'Albero, (31) Trivulzio Candelabrum.

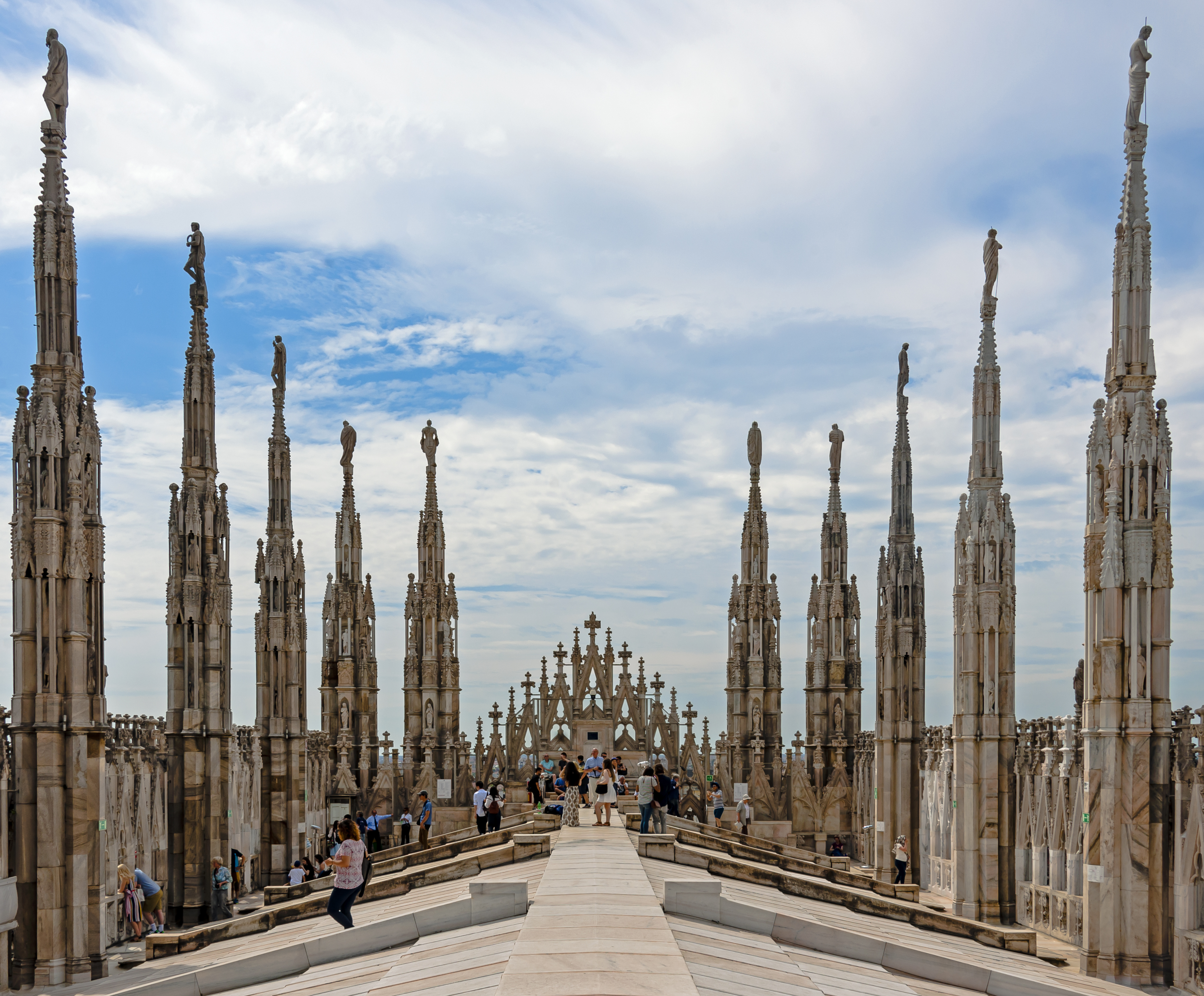
Tourists on the roof

The plan consists of a nave with four side aisles, crossed by a transept and then followed by choir and apse. The height of the nave is about 45 metres (148 ft), with the highest Gothic vaults in a completed church (not as high as the 48 metres (157 ft) of Beauvais Cathedral, but it was never completed).

The roof is open to tourists (for a fee), offering close-up views of sculpture that would otherwise go unnoticed. The roof of the cathedral is known for its forest of openwork pinnacles and spires, set upon flying buttresses.

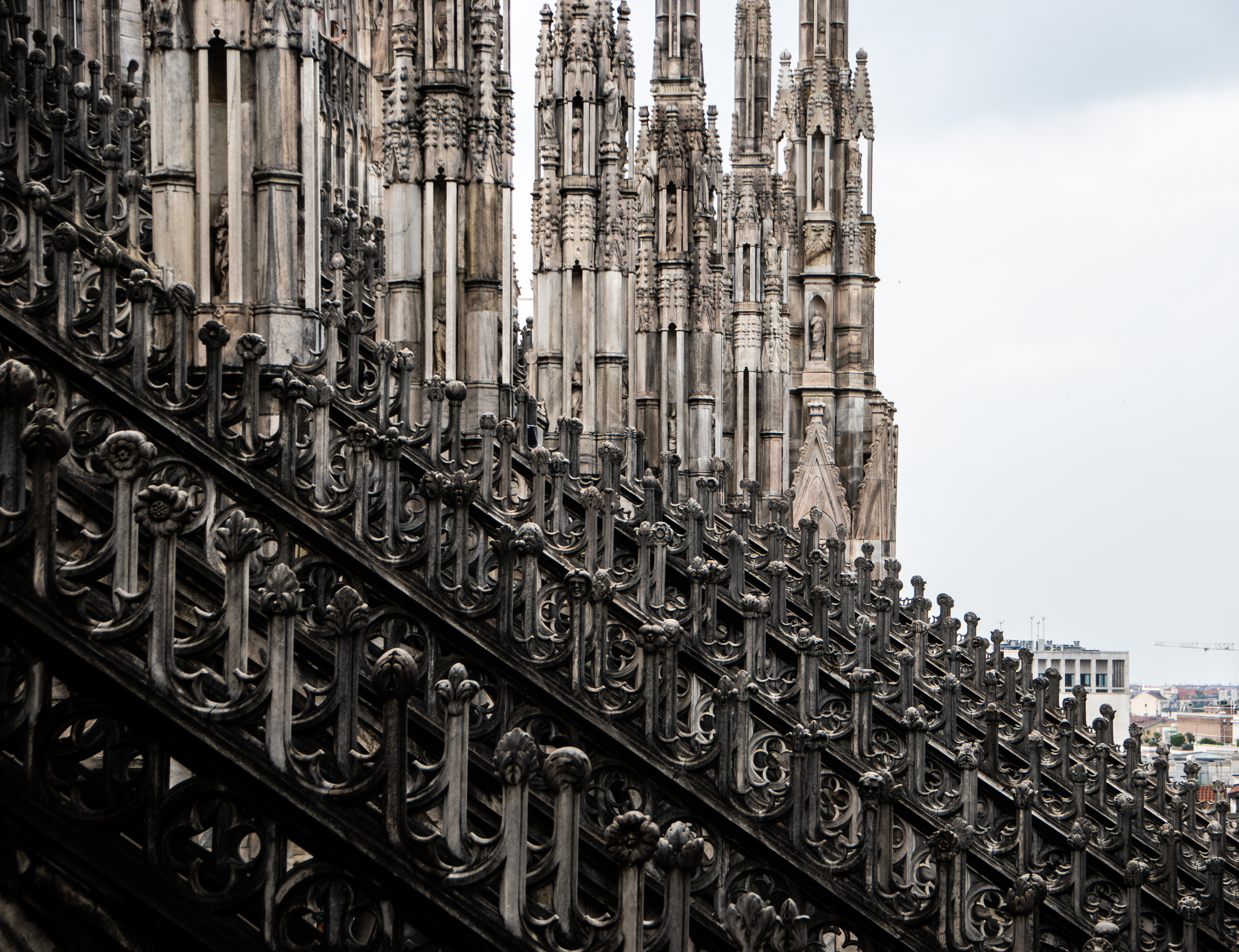
Flying buttresses

The cathedral's five broad naves, divided by 40 pillars, are reflected in the hierarchic openings of the façade. Even the transepts have aisles. The nave columns are 24.5 metres (80 ft) high, and the apsidal windows are 20.7 by 8.5 metres (68 by 28 ft). It is a brick building, faced with marble from the quarries which Gian Galeazzo Visconti donated in perpetuity to the cathedral chapter. Maintenance and repairs are very complicated.

In 2015, Milan's cathedral developed a new lighting system using LEDs.

=== Aesthetic judgements ===
The cathedral was built over several hundred years in a number of contrasting styles. Reactions to it have ranged from admiration to disfavour. The Guida d’Italia: Milano 1998

(Touring Club Editore, p. 154) points out that the early Romantics tended to praise it in "the first intense enthusiasms for Gothic". As the Gothic Revival brought in a purer taste, condemnation was often equally intense.

John Ruskin commented acidly that the cathedral steals "from every style in the world: and every style spoiled. The cathedral is a mixture of Perpendicular with Flamboyant, the latter being peculiarly barbarous and angular, owing to its being engrafted, not on a pure, but a very early penetrative Gothic … The rest of the architecture among which this curious Flamboyant is set is a Perpendicular with horizontal bars across: and with the most detestable crocketing, utterly vile. Not a ray of invention in a single form… Finally the statues all over are of the worst possible common stonemasons’ yard species, and look pinned on for show. The only redeeming character about the whole being the frequent use of the sharp gable ... which gives lightness, and the crowding of the spiry pinnacles into the sky." (Notebooks[M.6L]). The plastered ceiling painted to imitate elaborate tracery carved in stone particularly aroused his contempt as a "gross degradation".

While appreciating the force of Ruskin's criticisms, Henry James was more appreciative: "A structure not supremely interesting, not logical, not … commandingly beautiful, but grandly curious and superbly rich. … If it had no other distinction it would still have that of impressive, immeasurable achievement … a supreme embodiment of vigorous effort."

=== Main monuments and sights ===
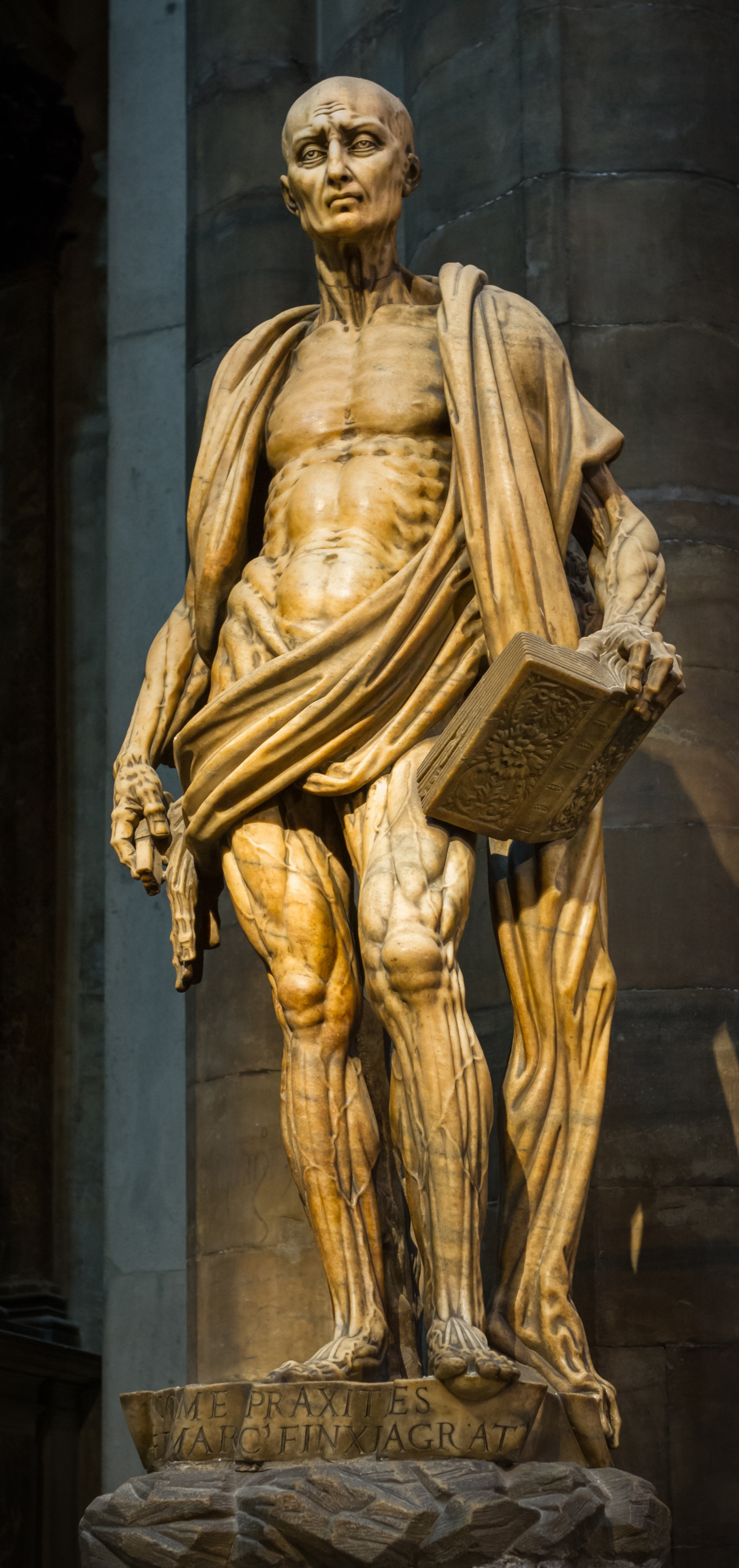
Statue of St Bartholomew Flayed (1562) by Marco d'Agrate

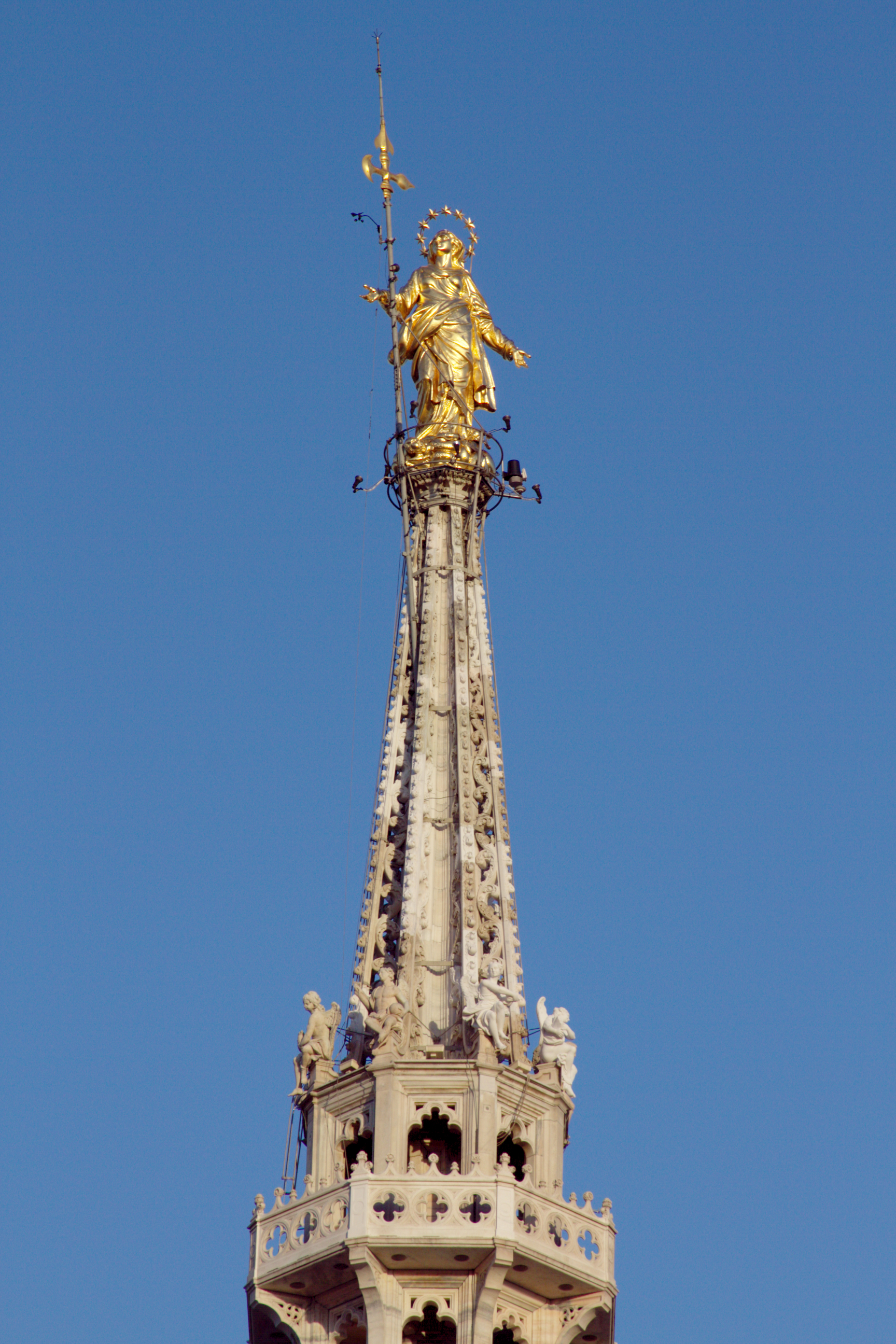
The Gold Madonna at the top of the cathedral

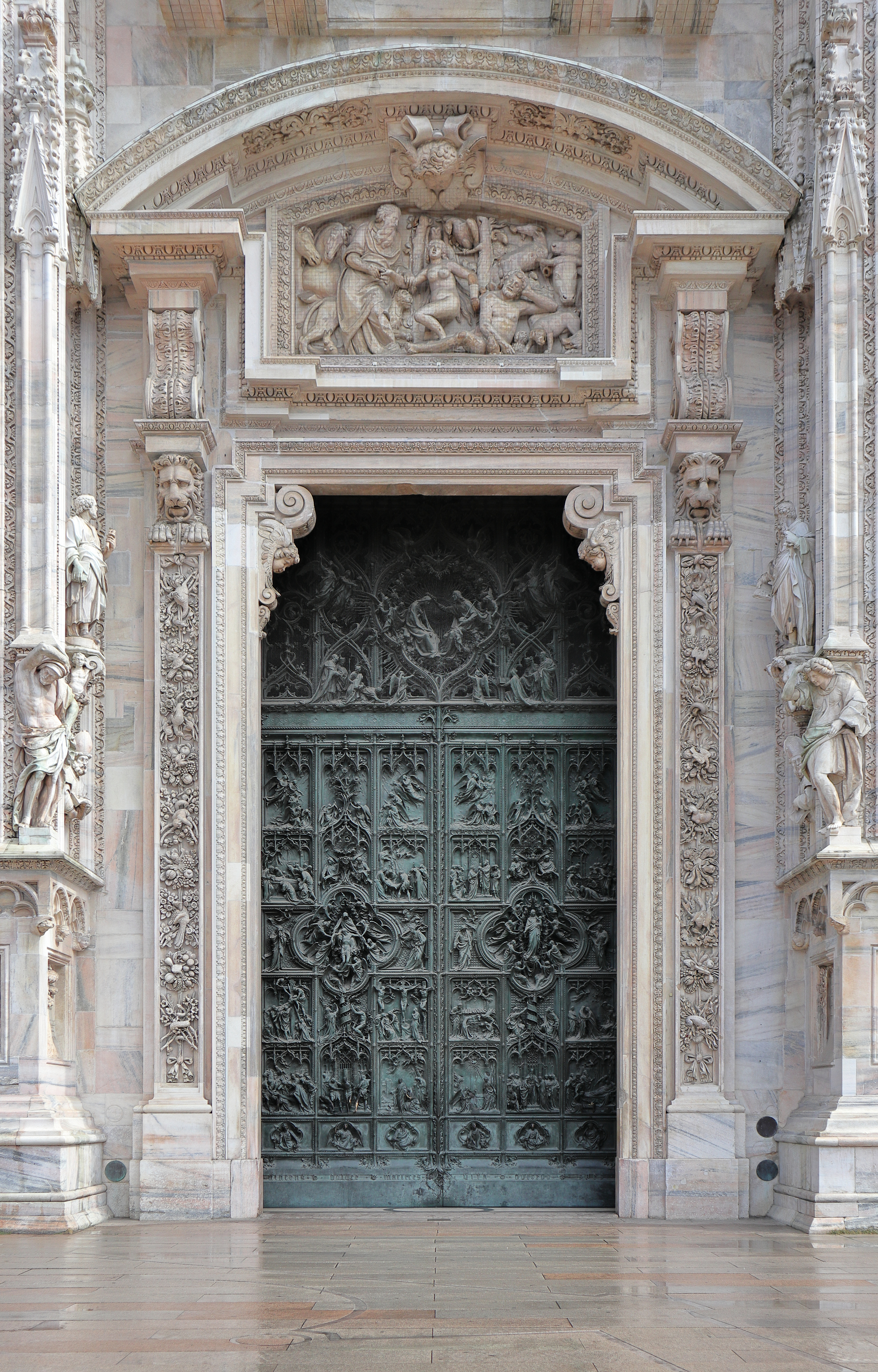
Artwork on the door of the cathedral

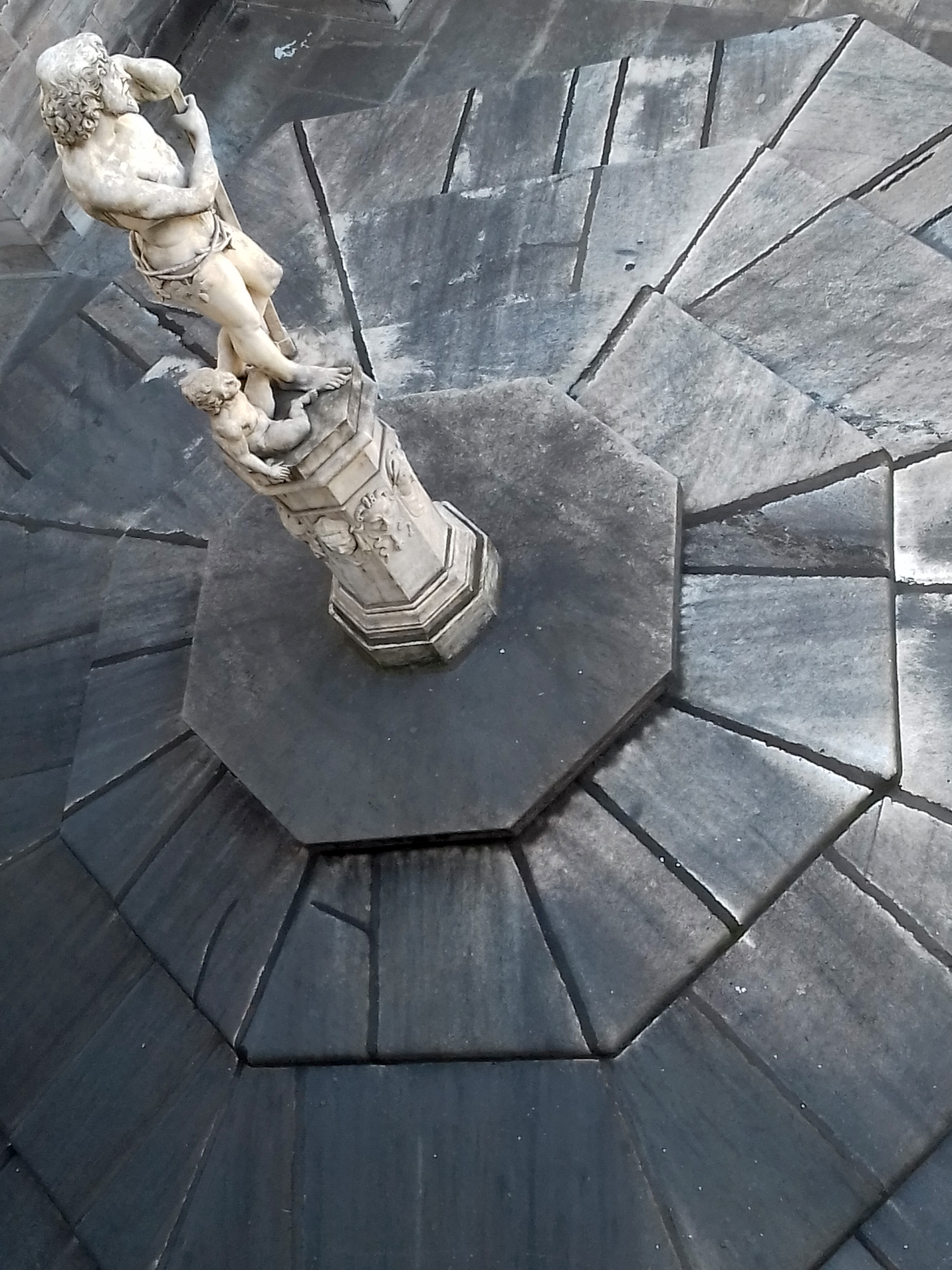
Statues on the roof

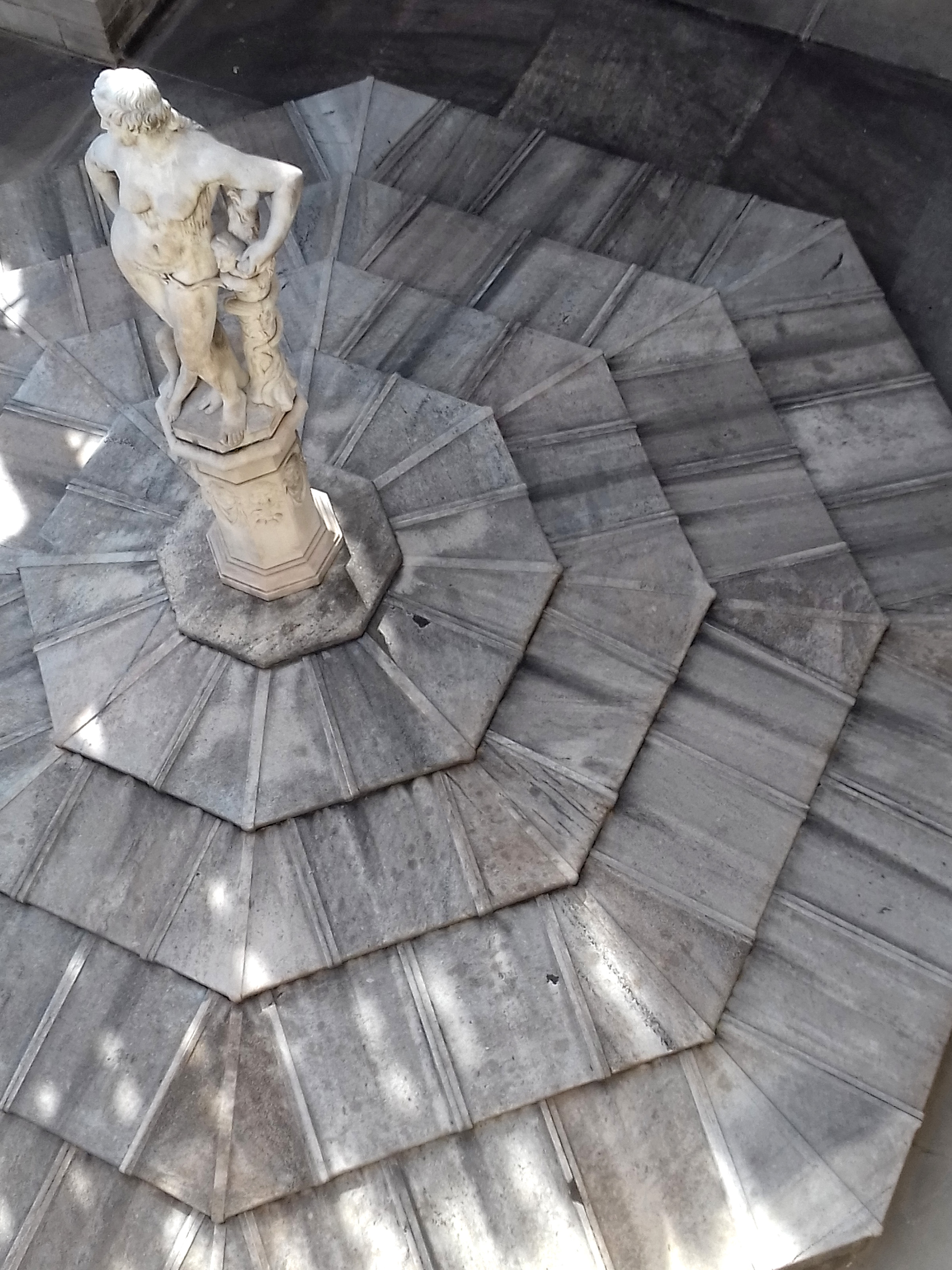

The interior of the cathedral includes numerous monuments and artworks. These include:

- At the left of the altar is located the most famous statue in the cathedral, Saint Bartholomew Flayed (1562) by Marco d'Agrate, which shows the saint carrying his own flayed skin thrown over his shoulders like a stole.
- The Archbishop Ariberto da Intimiano's sarcophagus, which is overlooked by a Crucifix in copper laminae (a replica).
- The sarcophagi of the archbishops Ottone Visconti and Giovanni Visconti, created by a Campionese master in the 14th century.
- The sarcophagus of Marco Carelli, who donated 35,000 ducati to accelerate the construction of the cathedral.
- The three magnificent altars by Pellegrino Pellegrini, which include the notable Federico Zuccari's Visit of St. Peter to St. Agatha jailed.
- In the right transept, the monument to Gian Giacomo Medici di Marignano, called "Medeghino", by Leone Leoni, and the adjacent Renaissance marble altar, decorated with gilt bronze statues.
- The presbytery is a late Renaissance masterpiece composing a choir, a Temple by Pellegrini, two pulpits with giant atlantes covered in copper and bronze, and two large organs. Around the choir, the two sacristies' portals, some frescoes and a fifteenth-century statue of Martin V by Jacopino da Tradate can be seen.
- The transepts house the Trivulzio Candelabrum, which is in two pieces. The base (attributed to Nicolas of Verdun, 12th no century), characterized by a fantastic ensemble of vines, vegetables and imaginary animals; and the stem, of the mid-16th century.
- In the left aisle, the Arcimboldi monument by Alessi and Romanesque figures depicting the Apostles in red marble and the neo-Classic baptistry by Pellegrini.
- A small red light bulb in the dome above the apse marks the spot where one of the nails reputedly from the Crucifixion of Christ has been placed. The Holy Nail is retrieved and exposed to the public every year, during a celebration known as the Rite of the Nivola.
- In November and December, in the days surrounding the birthdate of Saint Charles Borromeo, a series of large canvases, the Quadroni are exhibited along the nave.
- Since September 2005, in the cathedral's crypt, beside the relics of Saint Charles Borromeo, there has been a video installation by English artist Mark Wallinger. Entitled Via Dolorosa, it consists of an 18-minute film reproducing scenes of the Passion excerpted from the film Jesus of Nazareth by Franco Zeffirelli.
- In November 2014 a white marble sculpture by Tony Cragg inspired by the Madonna statue on the rooftop was installed.
- The 5-manual, 225-rank pipe organ, built jointly by the Tamburini and Mascioni Italian organ building firms on Mussolini's command, is currently the largest organ in all of Italy.

The American writer and journalist Mark Twain visited Milan in the summer of 1867. He dedicated chapter 18 of Innocents Abroad to Milan Cathedral, including many physical and historical details, and a visit to the roof. He describes the Duomo as follows:

What a wonder it is! So grand, so solemn, so vast! And yet so delicate, so airy, so graceful! A very world of solid weight, and yet it seems ...a delusion of frostwork that might vanish with a breath!... The central one of its five great doors is bordered with a bas-relief of birds and fruits and beasts and insects, which have been so ingeniously carved out of the marble that they seem like living creatures--and the figures are so numerous and the design so complex, that one might study it a week without exhausting its interest...everywhere that a niche or a perch can be found about the enormous building, from summit to base, there is a marble statue, and every statue is a study in itself...Away above, on the lofty roof, rank on rank of carved and fretted spires spring high in the air, and through their rich tracery one sees the sky beyond. ... (Up on) the roof...springing from its broad marble flagstones, were the long files of spires, looking very tall close at hand, but diminishing in the distance...We could see, now, that the statue on the top of each was the size of a large man, though they all looked like dolls from the street... They say that the Cathedral of Milan is second only to St. Peter's at Rome. I cannot understand how it can be second to anything made by human hands.

Oscar Wilde visited Milan in June 1875. In a letter to his mother, he wrote: "The Cathedral is an awful failure. Outside the design is monstrous and inartistic. The over-elaborated details stuck high up where no one can see them; everything is vile in it; it is, however, imposing and gigantic as a failure, through its great size and elaborate execution."

In Italian Hours, Henry James describes:

a certain exhibition that I privately enjoyed of the relics of St. Charles Borromeus. This holy man lies at his eternal rest in a small but gorgeous sepulchral chapel … and for the modest sum of five francs you may have his shrivelled mortality unveiled and gaze at it with whatever reserves occur to you. The Catholic Church never renounces a chance of the sublime for fear of a chance of the ridiculous--especially when the chance of the sublime may be the very excellent chance of five francs. The performance in question, of which the good San Carlo paid in the first instance the cost, was impressive certainly, but as a monstrous matter or a grim comedy may still be. The little sacristan, having secured his audience, … lighted a couple of extra candles and proceeded to remove from above the altar, by means of a crank, a sort of sliding shutter, just as you may see a shop-boy do of a morning at his master's window...The black mummified corpse of the saint is stretched out in a glass coffin, clad in his mouldering canonicals, mitred, crosiered and gloved, glittering with votive jewels. It is an extraordinary mixture of death and life; the desiccated clay, the ashen rags, the hideous little black mask and skull, and the living, glowing, twinkling splendour of diamonds, emeralds and sapphires. The collection is really fine, and many great historic names are attached to the different offerings. Whatever may be the better opinion as to the future of the Church, I can't help thinking she will make a figure in the world so long as she retains this great fund of precious "properties," this prodigious capital decoratively invested and scintillating throughout Christendom at effectively-scattered points.

== Astronomical observations ==
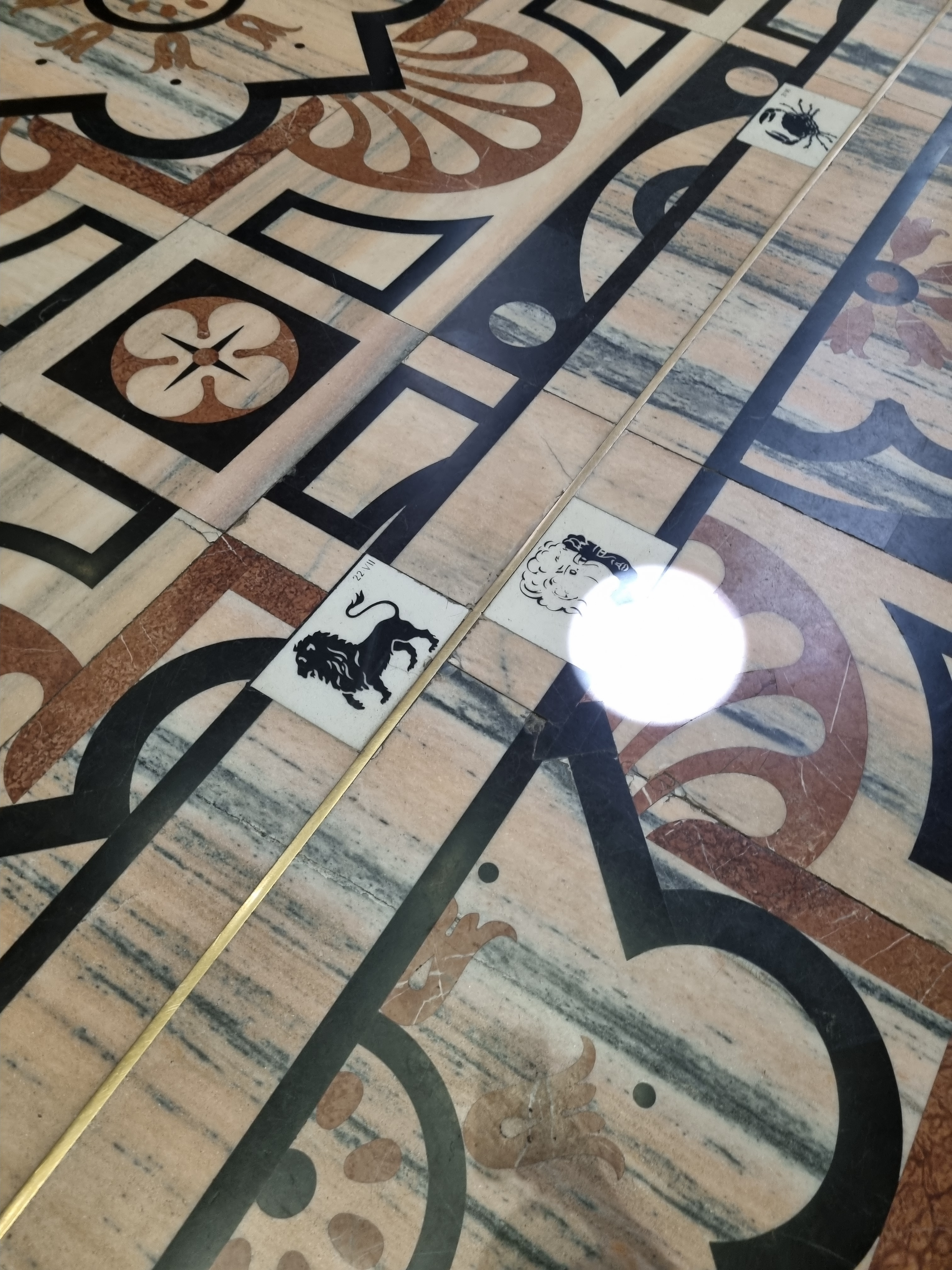
A beam of sunlight is approaching the sign of Gemini on the meridional line indicating the nearing solar noon on the first day of Gemini season.

From 1 December 1786, the Austrian Empire adopted “transalpine time”. The astronomers at Brera Astronomical Observatory were engaged by Count Giuseppe Di Wilczek, the plenipotentiary governor of Lombardy, to build a meridian line inside the Duomo. The meridian was constructed by Giovanni Angelo Cesaris and Francesco Reggio, with Roger Boscovich acting as a consultant.

The meridian line was laid on the floor of the Duomo at the west end so as to be accessible and not interfere with religious services. A hole was inserted in the roof near the south wall at a height of 24 metres (79 ft). The Duomo is not quite wide enough for a hole at this height so the meridian line extends up the north wall for about 3 metres (9.8 ft). As the beam of light crossed the brass line and indicated solar noon, a signal was given towards the tower of the Palazzo dei Giureconsulti. A person there alerted Sforzesco Castle and a cannon was fired to announce solar noon to the city. This signal was then used to set all of the city clocks to the same time.

The line was examined in 1976 by the architects of the Duomo and astronomers from Brera. There was a deviation in azimuth by up to 7 millimetres (0.28 in) and in level by up to 14 millimetres (0.55 in) but the accuracy of the line still enabled the fixing of solar noon to within 2 seconds.

== Gallery ==
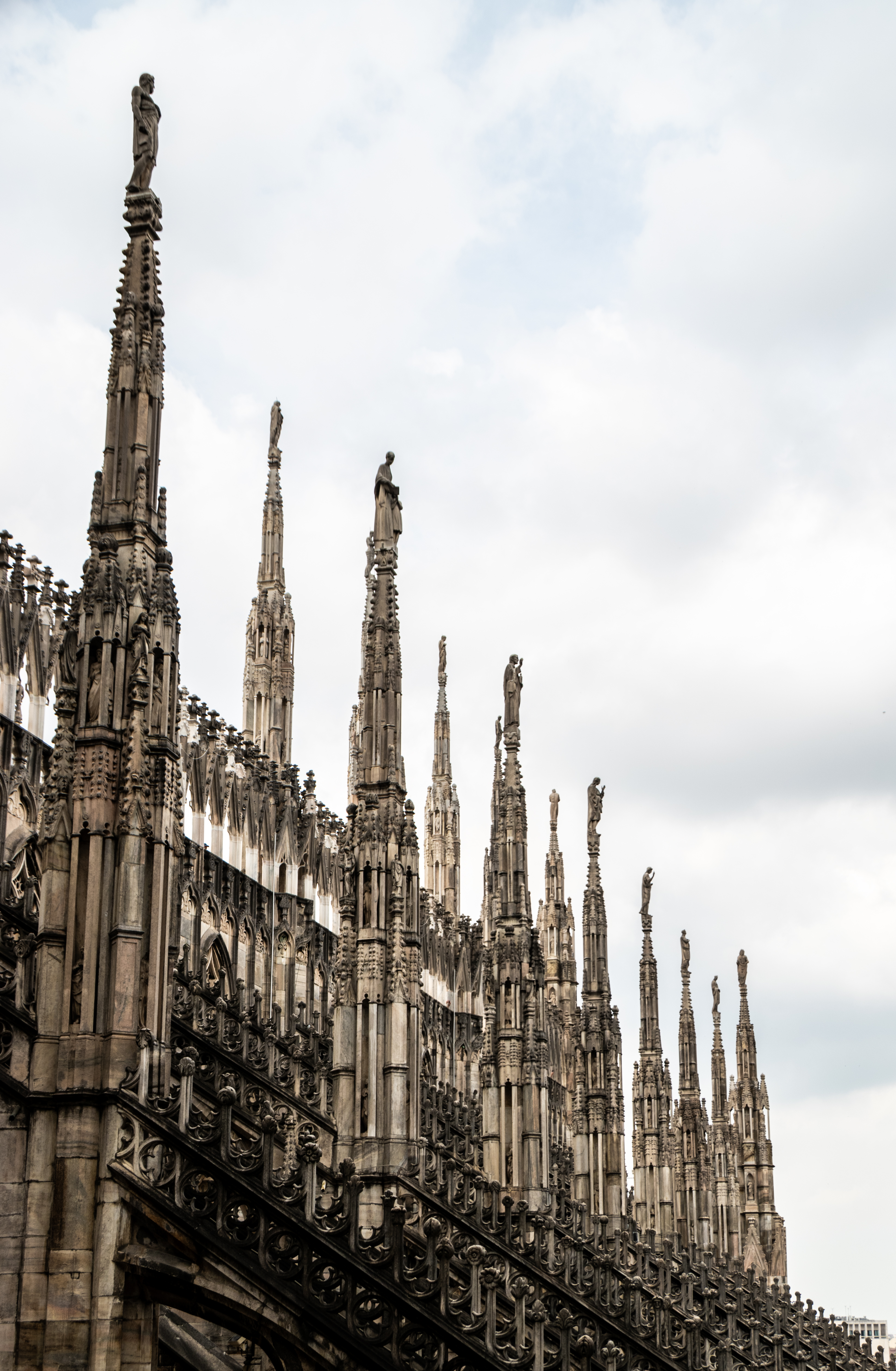
Ornate pinnacles

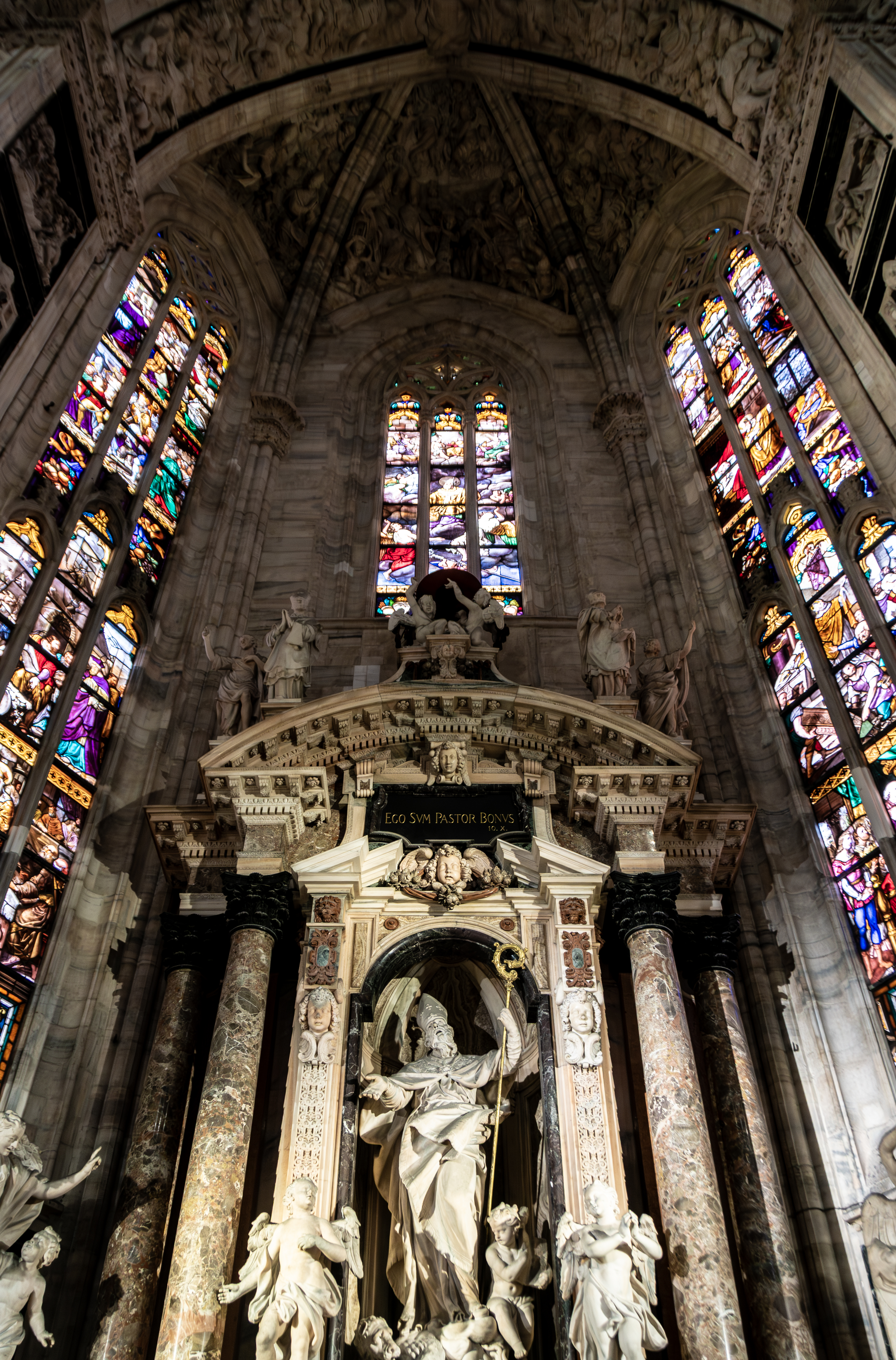
Chapel of the Madonna dell'Albero, left transept

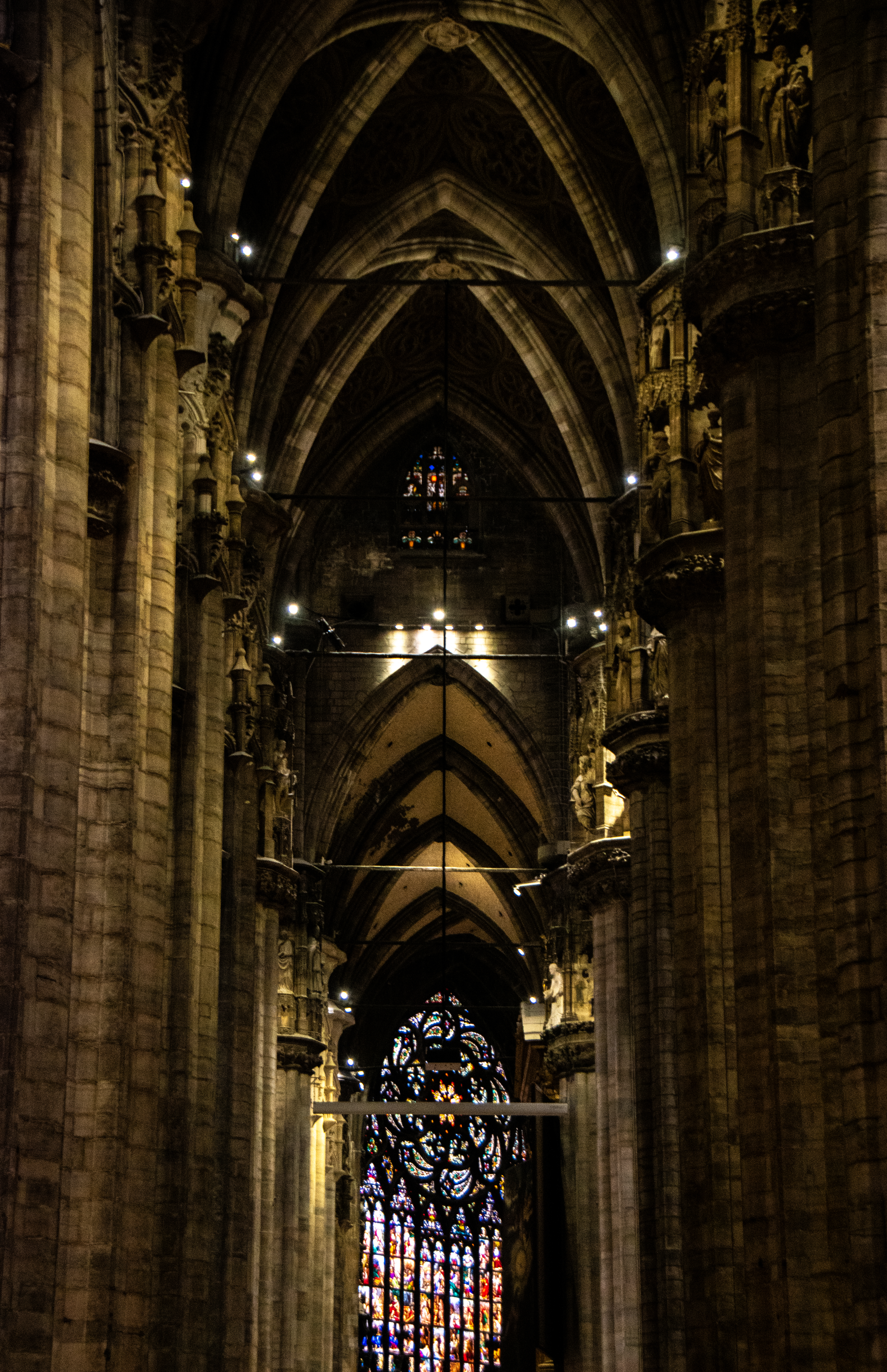
Left nave

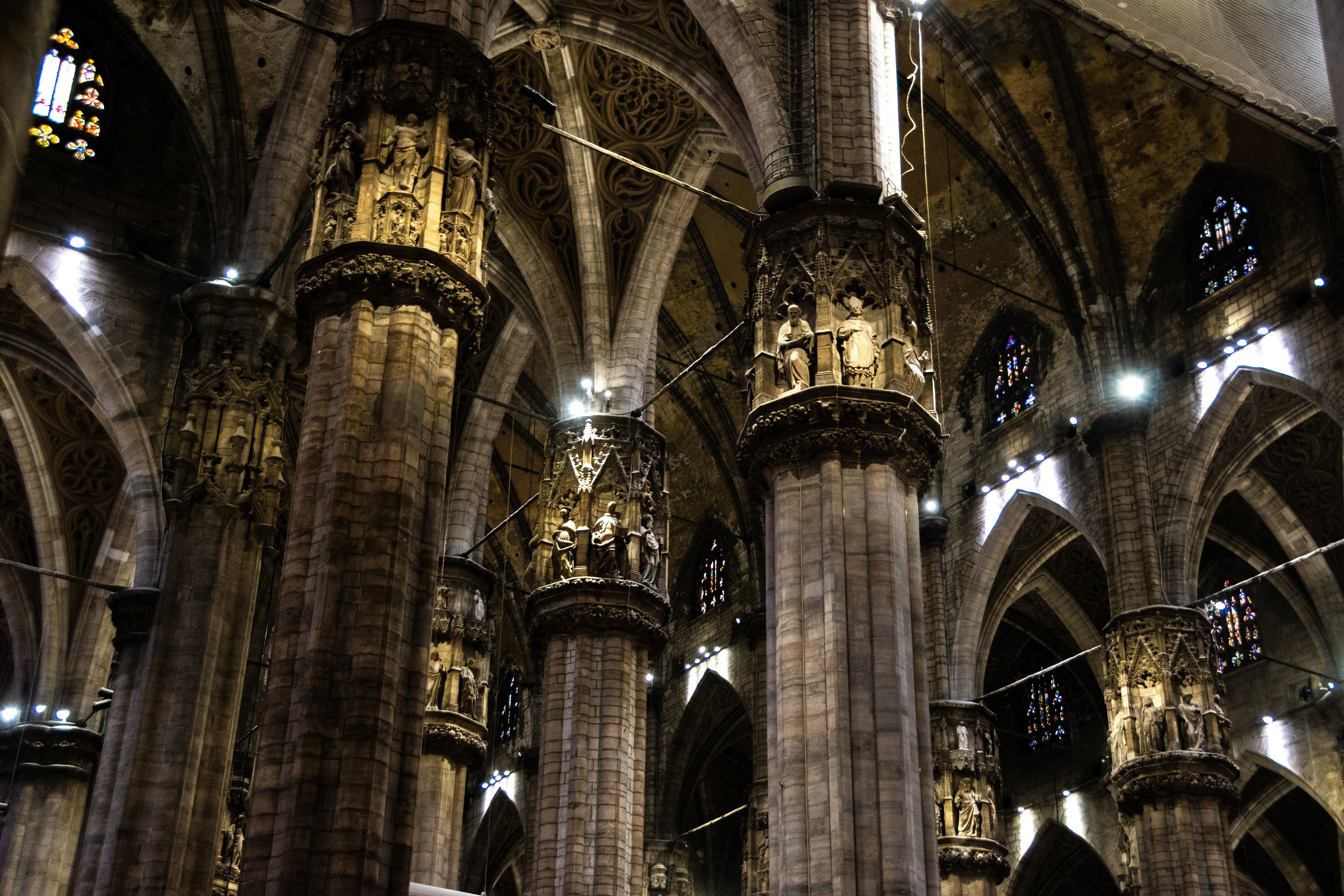
Interior columns

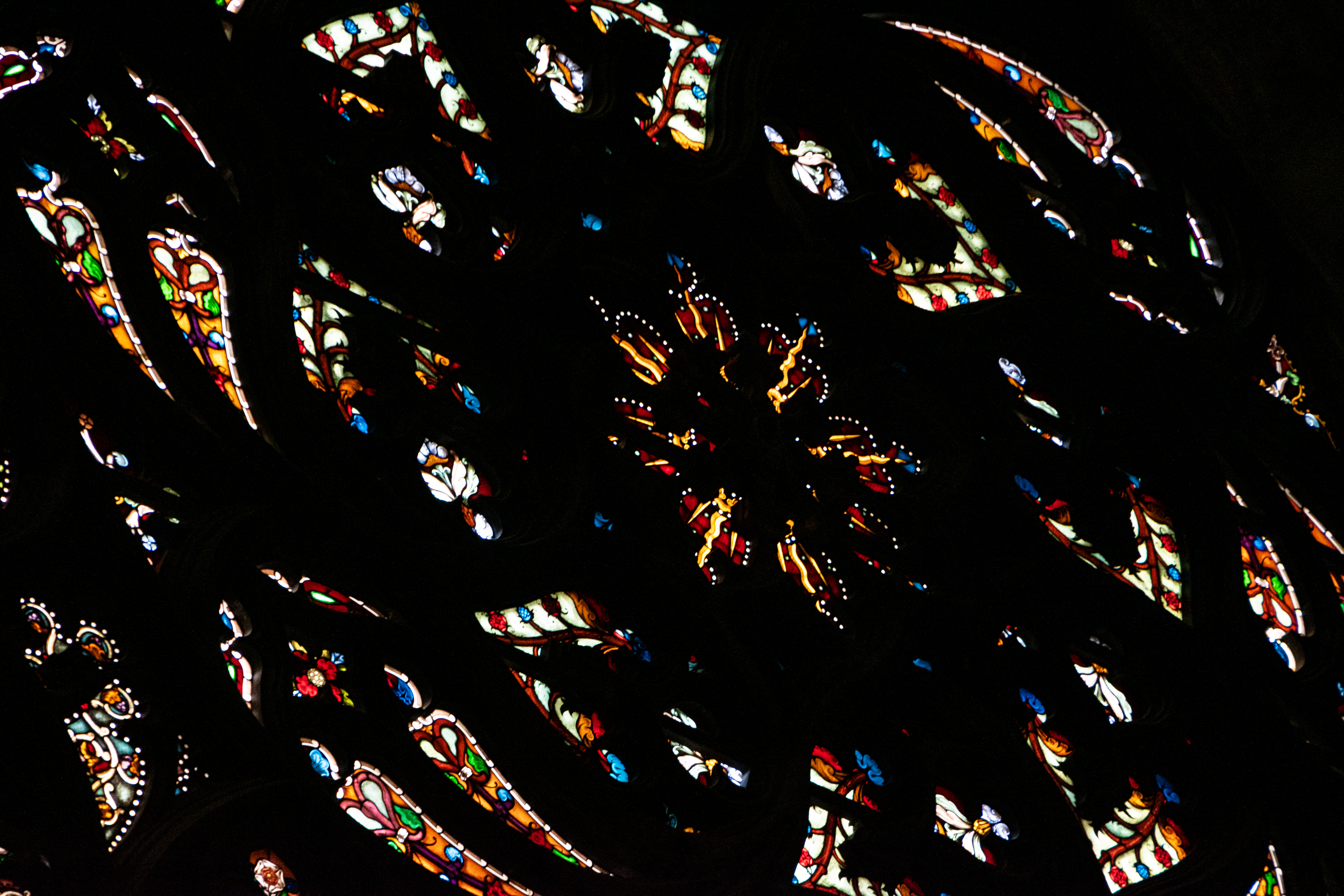
Stained glass window

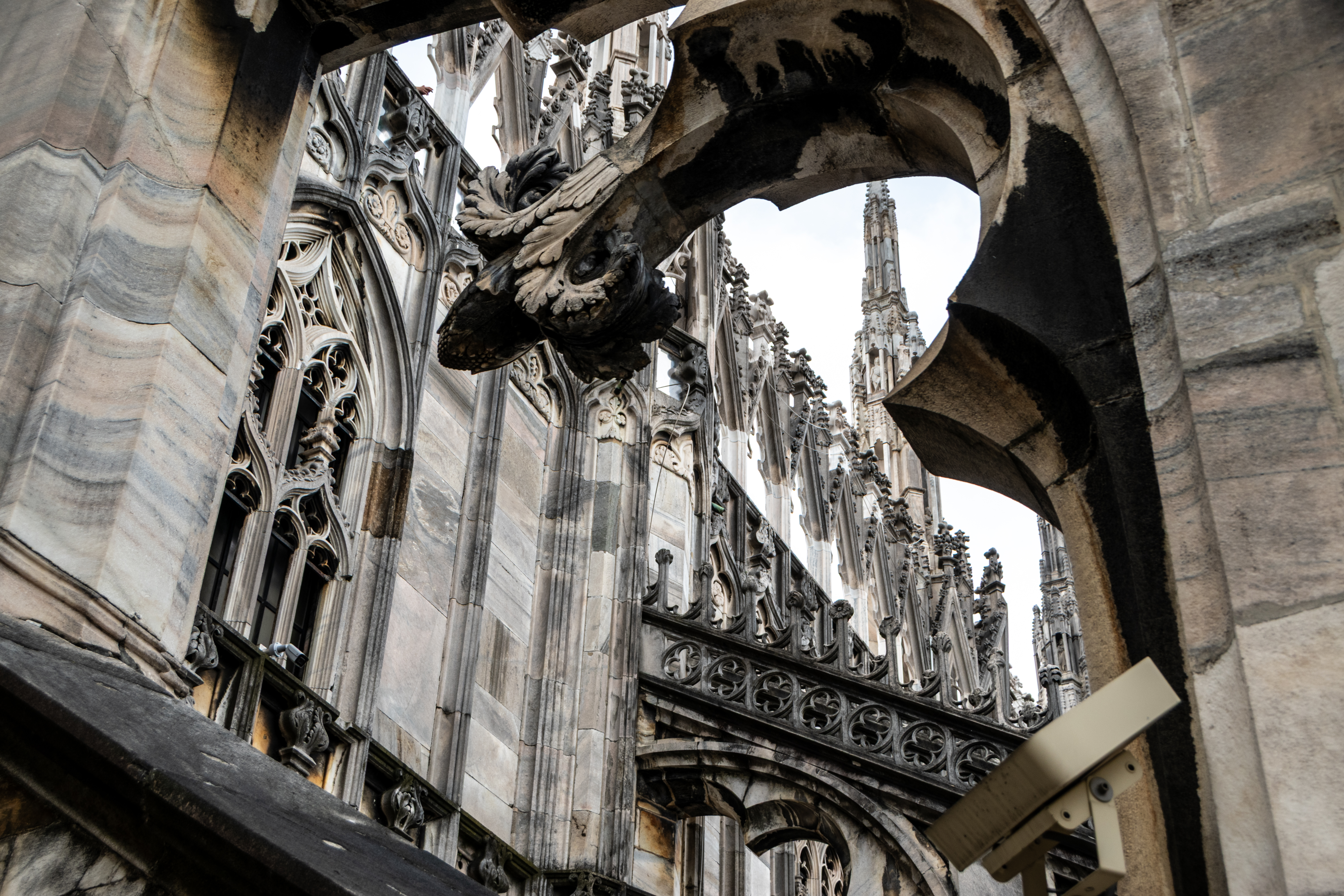
Various roof details

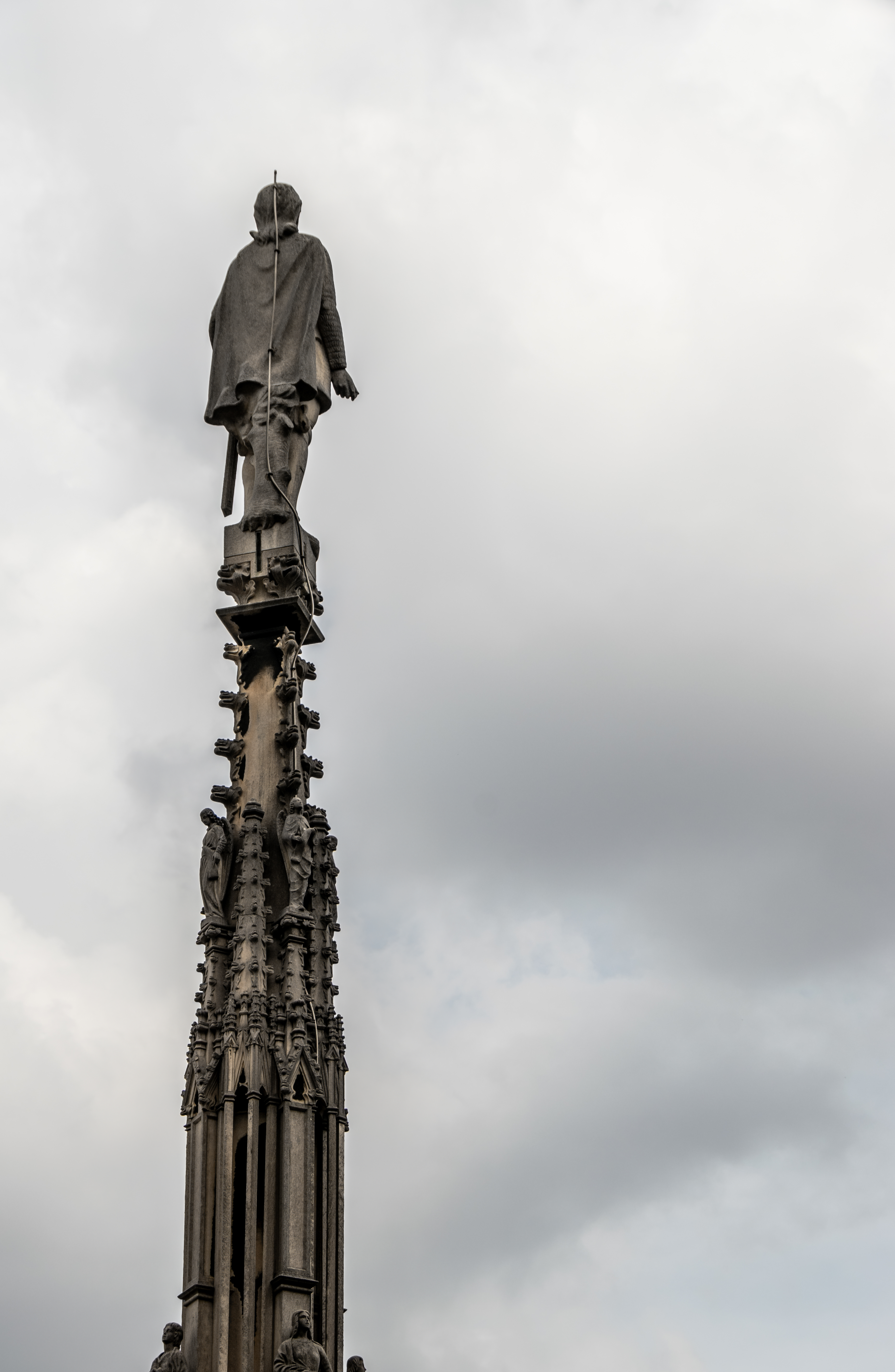
Statue of St. Joan of Arc

== See also ==
- Anor Londo (Dark Souls)
- Early Christian churches in Milan
- Late medieval domes
- Italian Renaissance domes
- Italian Gothic architecture
- Mailänder Dom (Fassade), Mailand
- List of Gothic Cathedrals in Europe
- List of largest church buildings in the world
- List of highest church naves
- Gothic art in Milan
- Veneranda Fabbrica del Duomo di Milano
