= Mailänder Dom (Fassade), Mailand =

Photograph by Thomas Struth

Mailänder Dom (Fassade), Mailand, in English: Milan Cathedral (Façade), Milan, is a color photograph taken by German photographer Thomas Struth, in 1998. It has a ten prints edition.

== History and description ==
Struth dedicated a large part of his work to the depiction of museums and monuments, with the presence of their visitors. Most of the time he took photographs of their interior, while in this case, he captures part of the façade of the Milan Cathedral, with several people nearby. Struth lived in Italy, where he experienced their artistic and religious world. The depiction of ancient historical cathedrals had been the subject of many painters of the past, especially in the 19th century, such as Carlo Canella, who painted then the Milan Cathedral. At the same time, some of the first photographers also took pictures of churches and cathedrals, like Louis-Auguste Bisson and Auguste-Rosalie Bisson, who took a photograph of the Cathedral of Notre Dame, Paris, c. 1853, which is devoided of human presence, unlike Struth's work.

Struth's current photograph has some similarities with the work of Canella. The cathedral occupies three-fourths of the picture, and its historical and artistic presence is massive and dominates the picture, while it also serves as the background for the life of the city, with the vivid presence of passers-by, devotees, and tourists.

The Metropolitan Museum of Art website states that "This photograph of the Milan Cathedral in bright sunlight laminates onto a single plane the timelessness of the twisting figures decorating a façade that developed over nearly three centuries with the ephemeral passage of noonday loungers, strollers, and sunbathers."

== Art market ==
A print of the photograph sold for $565,000 at Christie's New York, on 13 May 2008.

== Public collections ==
There are prints of the photograph at the Metropolitan Museum of Art, in New York, and at the Gund Gallery of the Kenyon College, in Gambier, Ohio.
