= Simone da Orsenigo =

14th-century Italian architect

Simone da Orsenigo was an Italian architect and builder of the 14th century. Hailing from Lombardy, he was most likely a native of Orsenigo, near Como. Orsenigo is remembered mostly for his work on the Cathedral of Milan in 1387, he originally built the Cathedral from brick in the Lombard Style but other styles were added by later architects. On a 1387 list of masters working on the Duomo, his name comes immediately after that of Marco da Campione, who headed the associates. On it, Orsenigo is called an engineer (Insegnerius).

Another master with the same name, Paolino Orsenigo, was also employed at the cathedral - in 1400 - as master of the scaffolding.
