= House of Arese =

Milanese noble family

Arese
- Noble family
- Motto: Per lealtà mantener (To maintain loyalty/For loyalty, maintain)
- Country: Italy Former countries: Duchy of Milan; Golden Ambrosian Republic; Transpadane Republic; Cisalpine Republic; Italian Republic; Kingdom of Italy; Kingdom of Lombardy–Venetia; Kingdom of Italy
- Earlier spellings: Arexio, Aresi, Arisiis
- Titles: Patricians of Milan (1277); Lords of Pieve di Seveso (1538); Counts of Castel Lambro (1627); Counts of Parabiago (extinguished mid-17th century); Counts of Barlassina (1666)
- Style: Don or Donna
- Cadet branches: Arese Lucini; Arese Jacini (extinct); Borromeo Arese; Litta Visconti Arese (extinct); Visconti Borromeo Arese (extinct)

The Arese (or Arexio, Aresi, or de Arisiis in ancient form) are a prominent family of the Milanese nobility.

== Origins ==
The family originates in the comune of Arese on the outskirts of Milan, where they were feudal lords since at least the 11th century as the Lombard Capitanei of Arese (Cataniis d'Arexio). Capitaneo was a hereditary title of milites particular to medieval Lombardy, a captain of knights and autonomous vassal of the Archbishop of Milan, who from the 11th century largely governed the city and was often chosen among the capitanei. It is likely that between the 12th and 13th centuries, in the years of the Lombard League, the Arese moved within city walls, along with other surrounding capitanei building political legitimacy in the Milanese free commune through ecclesiastical benefice of the Ambrosian church, while defending it from the Holy Roman Emperor. Following establishment of the Milanese signoria in 1259, the Arese were included in Ottone Visconti's 1277 Matricula nobilium familiarum Mediolani as one of the most ancient patrician citizens of Milan.

== 14th and 15th centuries ==
During the late Middle Ages and early Renaissance, the Arese were notable as "nobiltà di toga" ("Nobles of the Robe"), aristocracy whose rank derived from civic stewardship of the commune, holding key judicial or administrative posts of the city-state during the signoria of the Visconti, Dukes of Milan, and the Ambrosian Republic. Giacomo Arese (Capitan d'Aresio), the first documented individual of extant lines, was a member of the Decurion Council in 1331 and a juridical consul of the Ecclesiastical Forum under Azzone Visconti. Ambrogio Arese was podestà of Voghera from 1371 under Galeazzo II Visconti and a member of the Decurion Council in 1388, notary of the Office of XII Provisioners, and chancellor of Milan under Gian Galeazzo Visconti. Andreolo Arese (de Arisiis), son of Antoniolo, was Gian Galeazzo Visconti's secretary from 1377 and his roaming ambassador towards becoming the first Duke of Milan in 1395. He represented Gian Galeazzo in France to negotiate and then ratify marriage between his daughter Valentina Visconti and Louis I, Duke of Orléans in 1388.

At the dawn of the Renaissance, during the violent reign of young Gian Maria Visconti, Cristoforo Arese, son of Ambrogio, continued as ambassador to the French court of Charles VI from 1407. His brothers Giacomo Arese was a collegiate jurisconsult and sindicatore ducale from 1406 and Martino Arese was made Gentiluomo Ducale in 1409 for facilitating transition of power to Filippo Maria Visconti. He was appointed to the last Visconti Duke's Decurion Council in 1427. During the early rule of the Sforza, from 1450, the family appears to recede from prominence in the governance of the Duchy of Milan.

== 16th and 17th centuries ==
The family became particularly influential in the years following the death of Ludovico Sforza, as the embattled Francesco II Sforza ceded Milan to Spanish Habsburg rule (1556–1707). In 1538 Bartolomeo II Arese, il Vecchio (1508–1562) was Treasurer-General for the Duchy of Milan under Francesco II Sforza. He acquired lordship of the Pieve of Seveso under Charles V, Holy Roman Emperor, with heirs consolidating power under Philip II, King of Spain through close alliances with the Archbishops of Milan Saint Charles Borromeo and Gaspare Visconti. Marco Antonio III Arese (1550–1610) was podestà of Cremona and Giovanni Battista Arese was governor of Rimini under Pius IV. Giulio I Arese (1560–1627) was a founding member of the Accademia degli Inquieti in Pavia in 1594 and president of the Senate of Milan, the Duchy's highest governing body, from 1619 under Phillip III.

Bartolomeo III Arese (1590–1674) was elected president of the Senate of Milan from 1660 after leading the suppression of French conspiracy in Northern Italy for Philip IV of Spain during the Thirty Years' War and the Great Plague of Milan, effectively becoming the Duchy's ruler. His vast political influence and artistic patronage while leading the Milanese domains under Charles II and Philip V and as president of the Council of Italy, marks the height of the Arese's jurisdiction. In the same period, Paolo Cesare Arese (1574–1644), philosopher, theologian, and Bishop of Tortona, authored Della tribolatione e suoi rimedi (1624) and Imprese Sacre (1621) in which he supports the Ptolemaic System. Girolamo Arese (1597–1611) was one of fourteen Martyrs of Prague, beatified in 2012.

In the years leading up to the War of the Spanish Succession, Marco II Arese (d. 1690) was a Milanese senator and regent of the Supreme Council of Italy in Madrid between 1680 and 1690. Giovanni Francesco Arese (1642–1715) was a general and governor of Mortara, Finale, Alessandria, and Cremona. He formed a significant collection of paintings, praised by Montesquieu in 1728 upon his visit to Palazzo Arese in Milan.

== 18th and 19th centuries ==
Following the War of the Spanish Succession, the Arese were prominent figures in Milanese cultural life, the establishment of the Cisalpine Republic, the Napoleonic Kingdom of Italy, Milanese resistance to the Austrian Empire, and Italian unification. Marco IV Arese Lucini (1770–1825) was an officer of the Cisalpine Republic and the Italian Republic, appointed by Napoleon Bonaparte once making Milan its capital. His wife, Antonietta Fagnani Arese (1778–1847) was a translator of Goethe and is the subject of Ugo Foscolo's ode All'amica risanata, cited by Benedetto Croce in his Philosophy of the Spirit as demonstration of art presupposing logic. Francesco Teodoro Arese Lucini (1778–1835) was held in the Špilberk Castle and sentenced to death (later commuted) by Francis I, Emperor of Austria for his former alliance with Eugène de Beauharnais, Viceroy of the Napoleonic Kingdom of Italy, and for conspiring to liberate Lombardy and unite it with Piedmont.

Francesco Benedetto Arese Lucini (1805–1881) authored A trip to the prairies and in the interior of North America 1837–1838, a diary of his journey with childhood friend Luis Napoleon Bonaparte, later Napoleone III. He was an Italian Senator and unofficial ambassador of Count Camillo Cavour in Paris during establishment of the Kingdom of Italy, negotiating concession of Nice and Savoy to France in exchange for supporting the Papal States's unification with Italy and for returning lands taken by Napoleon within Italy's current borders, such as the Roman Forum. Achille Arese Lucini (1841–1904) was a military officer and member of the Chamber of Deputies of the Kingdom of Italy.

== 20th century ==
Franco Arese Lucini, tenth count of Barlassina (1918–1994) was a prominent historian of Milan, president of the Lombardy Historical Society, and Mayor of Osnago. His research archives are held at the University of Insubria in Varese and Como.

== Notable members of the House of Arese ==
- Bartolomeo II il Vecchio (1508–1562)
- Paolo Cesare Arese (1574–1644)
- Giulio I Arese (1575–1627)
- Bartolomeo III Arese (1590–1674)
- Carlo IV Borromeo Arese (1657–1734)
- Giulio Visconti Borromeo Arese (1664–1750)
- Celia Grillo Borromeo Arese (1684–1777)
- Antonietta Fagnani Arese (1778–1847)
- Francesco Teodoro Arese Lucini (1778–1835)
- Francesco Benedetto Arese Lucini (1805–1881)
- Giberto Borromeo Arese (1815–1885)
- Franco Arese Lucini (1918–1994)
- Matilde Borromeo Arese Taverna (1983–)
- Beatrice Borromeo Arese Taverna (1985–)

== Notable homes ==
- Palazzo Arese Litta (Corso Magenta, Milan)
- Palazzo Arese Pallavicini (Corso Venezia, Milan – destroyed in the bombing of Milan in World War II)
- Palazzo Arese Bethlen (Via Monte di Pieta, Milan – destroyed in the bombing of Milan in World War II)
- Palazzo Arese Lucini (Osnago)
- Palazzo Arese Borromeo (Cesano Maderno)
- Palazzo Arese Jacini (Cesano Maderno)
- Palazzo Fagnani Arese (Robechetto)
- Palazzo Calcagnini Arese or Canevaro di Zoagli; U.S. Consulate General Florence (Florence)
- Castle of Arese (Arese – destroyed in 1270s by Napo della Torre; incorporated into town fabric, tower remains)
- Castle of Proh (Briona)
- Villa Arese (Arese – currently Salesian monastery)
- Tower then Villa Arese (Torre d'Arese – subdivided, portico, court, and loggia remain)
- Casa Arese Frigerio (Bollate – subdivided, studiolo with 16th century frescos remains as chapel)

== Heraldry ==
The heraldic emblem of the Arese is a pair of wings: a "stemma parlante" (speaking emblem), where in Milanese dialect the word for 'wings' is ar.

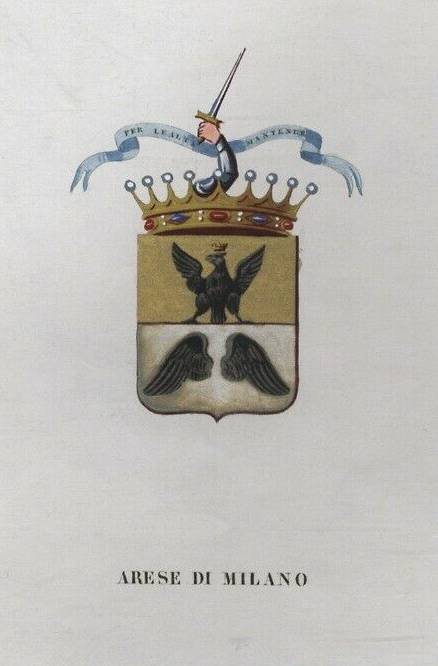
Arese di Milano, "Teatro araldico, ovvero raccolta generale delle armi ed insegne gentilizie delle più illustri e nobili casate che esisterono un tempo e che tuttora fioriscono in tutta Italia", by Leone Tettoni e F. Saladini, Lodi, Wilmant and sons, 1841–1848

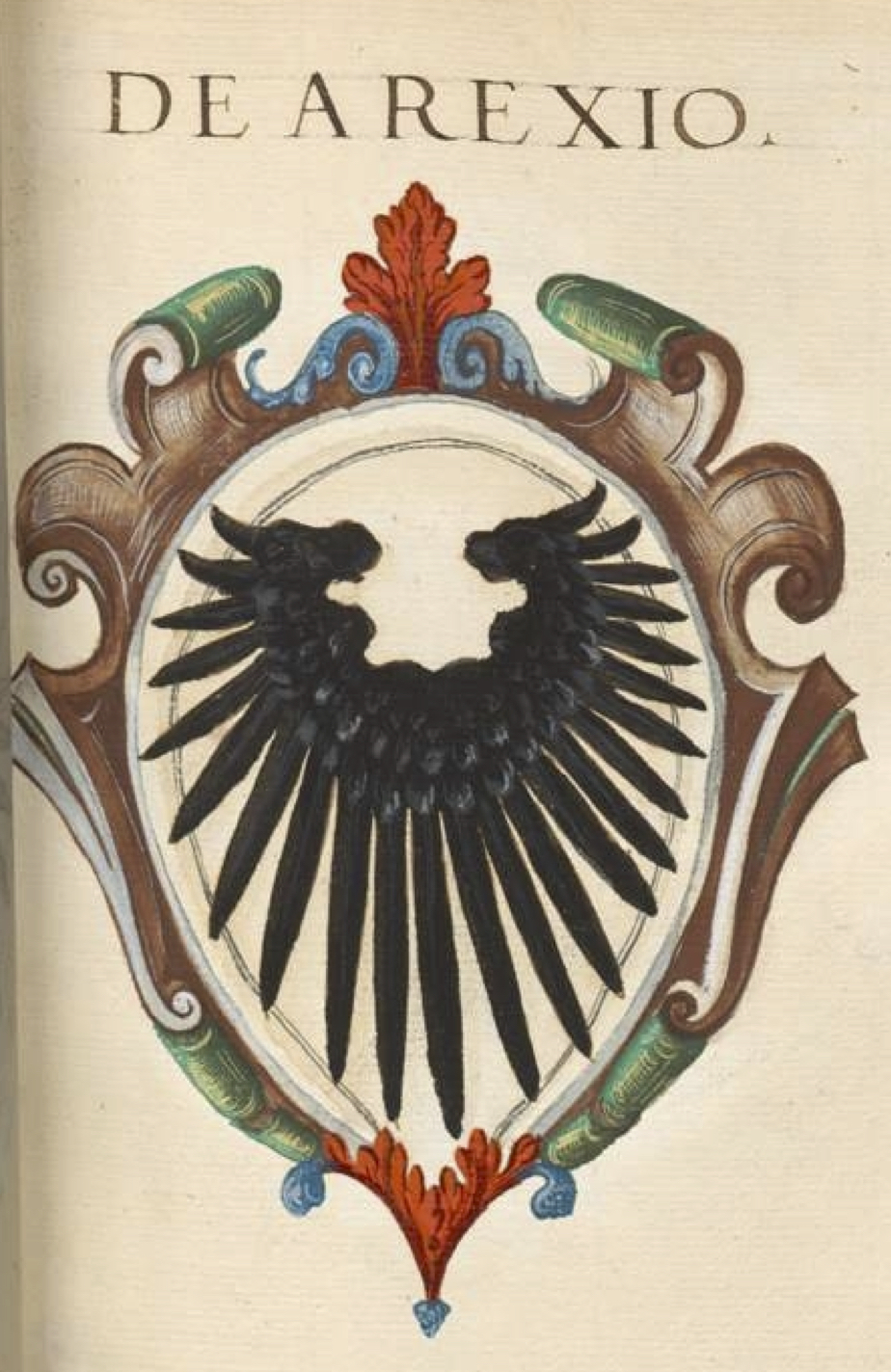
Emblem de Arexio, "V. Insignia urbium Italiae septentrionalis: Nobilium Mediolanensium", 1550–1555

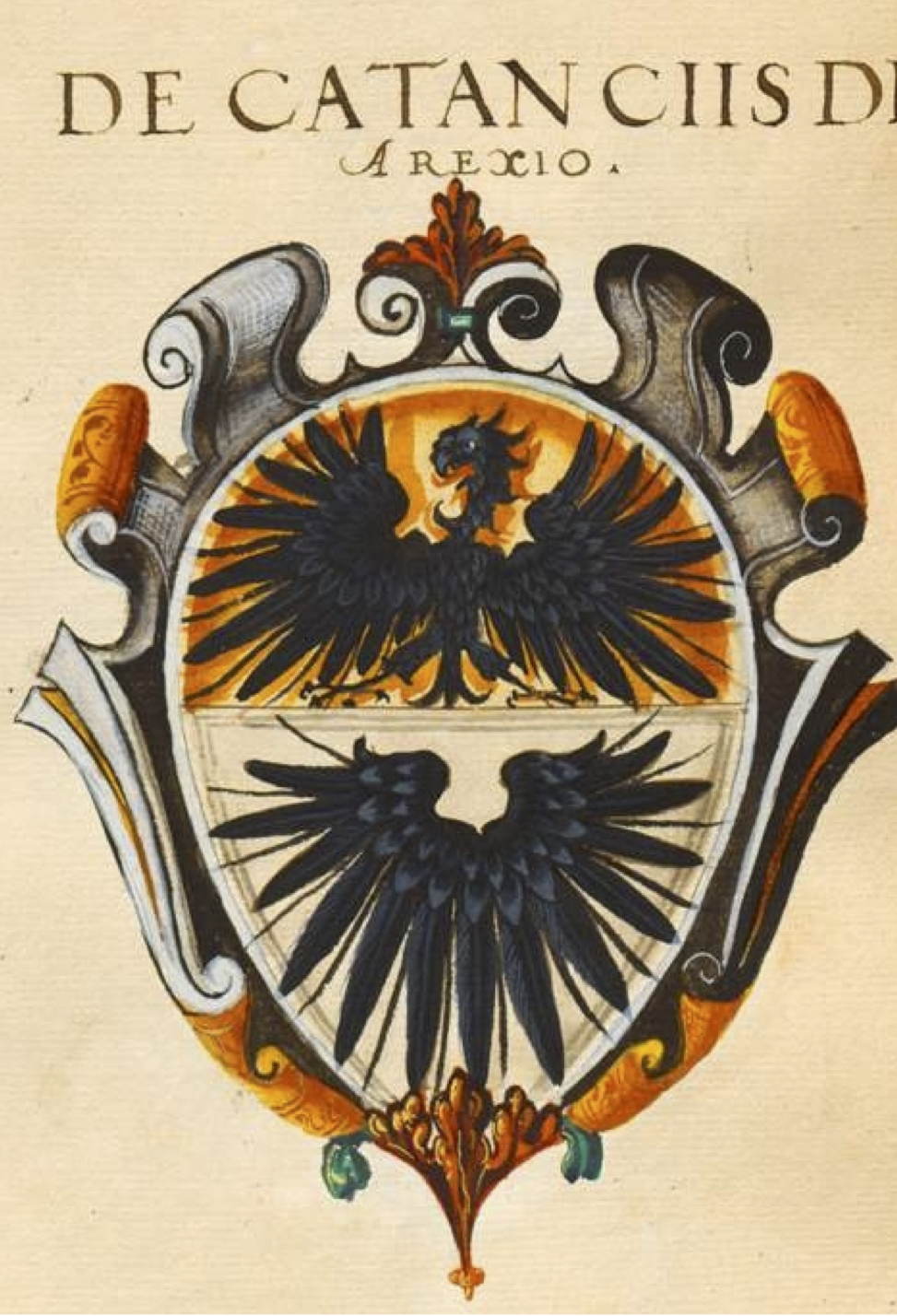
Emblem de Cataniis de Arexio, "V. Insignia urbium Italiae septentrionalis: Nobilium Mediolanensium", 1550–1555

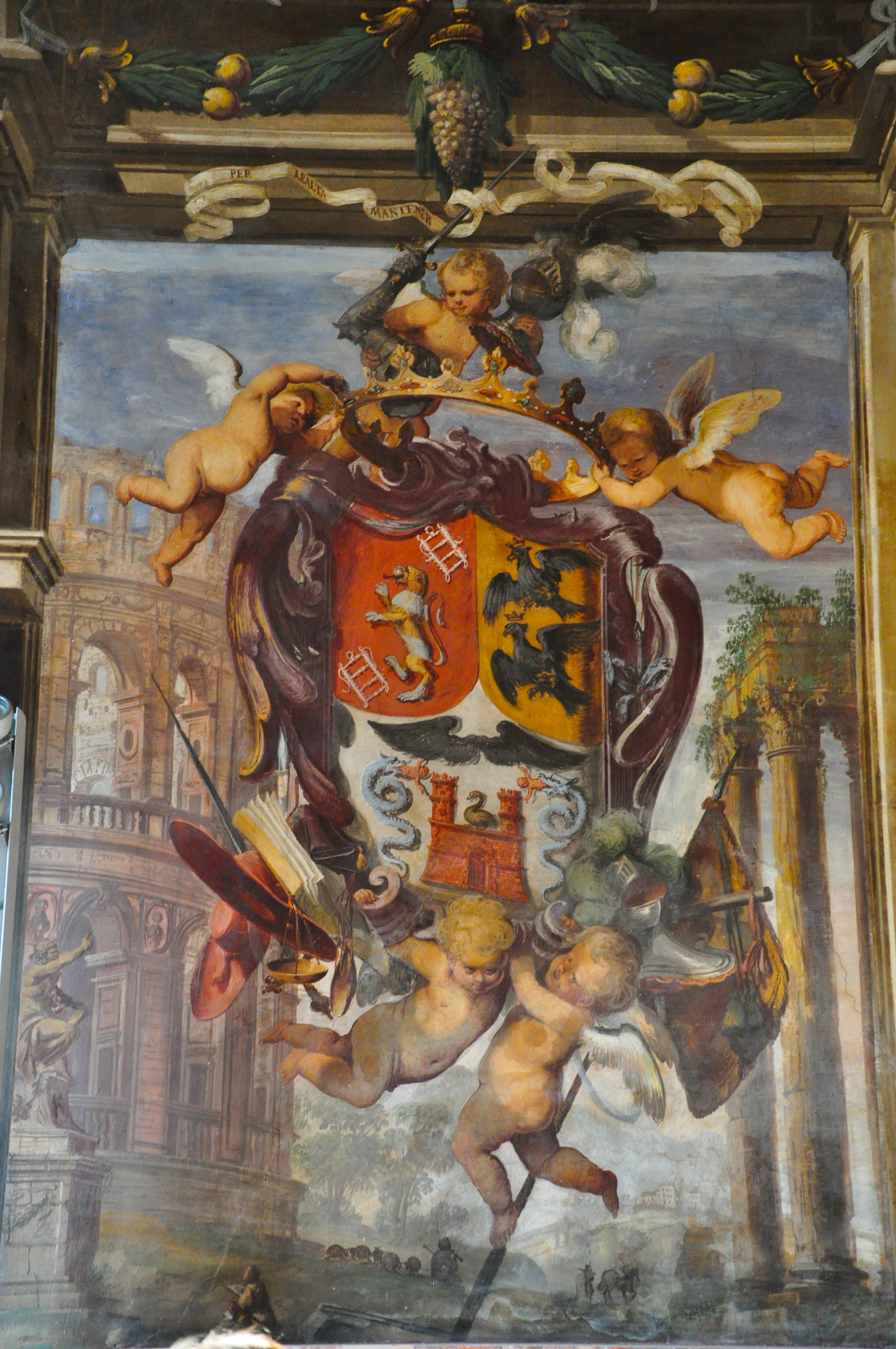
Emblem of the Arese with Omodei, Borromeo and Visconti in Palazzo Arese Borromeo (Cesano Maderno)

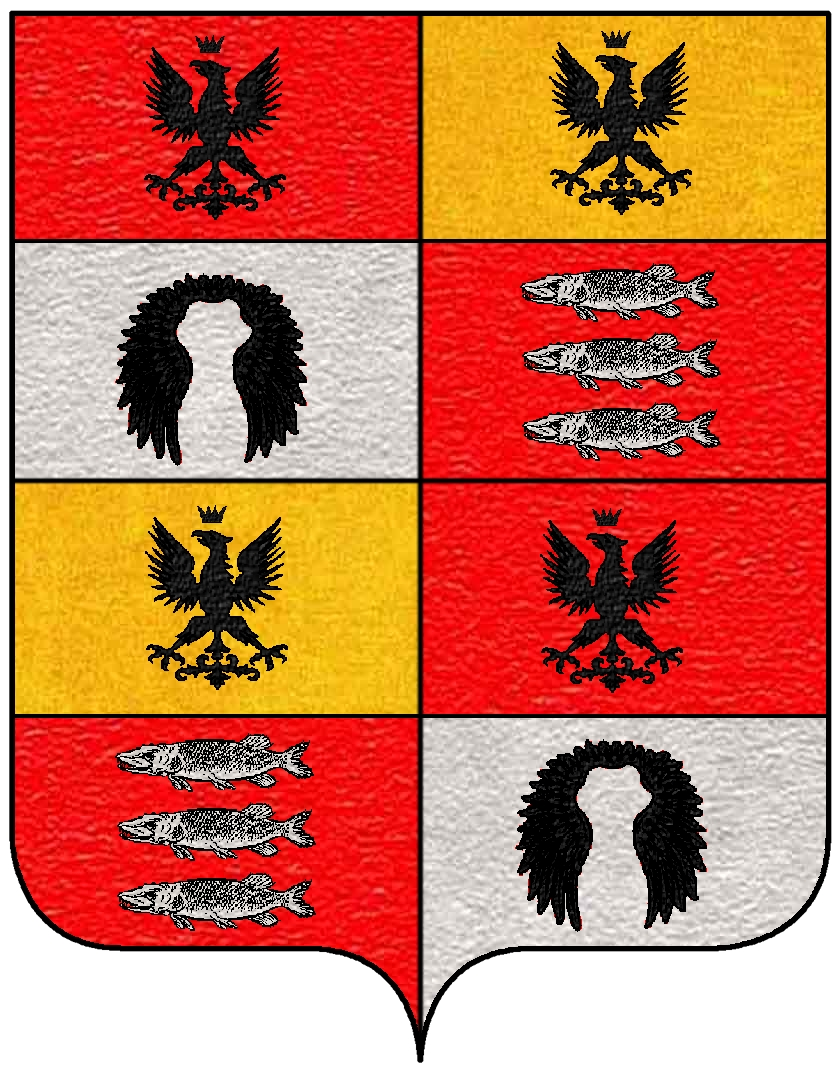
Emblem of the Arese Lucini

== Sources ==
- D. Santambrogio (Associazione Vivere il Palazzo e il Giardino Arese Borromeo)
- Elenco delle attuali nobili famiglie patrizie milanesi / rassegnato dall'ecc.ma Città di Milano all'eccelso Tribunale araldico in esecuzione dell'editto di Governo del giorno 20 novembre 1769, a cura di Franco Arese Lucini, s.l., s.d
- G. Leti, "Il governo del duca d'Ossuna e la vita del conte Bartolomeo Arese", Colonia 1682, ristampa a cura di M. Fabi, Milano 1854.
- M. L. Gatti Perer e a.v., "Il Palazzo Arese Borromeo a Cesano Maderno", ISAL, Milano 1999.
- D. Santambrogio, "Intavolatura delle Partite per la Provintia di Cesano – Una chiave di lettura per la fortuna patrimoniale di Bartolomeo III Arese in Brianza", in "Quaderni di Palazzo Arese Borromeo", Anno I /N°. 1, Maggio 2008.
- D. Santambrogio, "I beni di Casa Arese – Conti di Barlassina nel territorio di Cesano Maderno dal 1534 al 1698", in "Quaderni di Palazzo Arese Borromeo", Anno IV /N°. 1, Maggio 2012.
- D. Santambrogio, "Consistenza del patrimonio immobiliare di Bartolomeo Arese il Vecchio a Cesano nella prima metà del Cinquecento, ovvero la genesi dell'egemonia aresiana nel nostro territorio", Anno VII /N°. 1, Maggio 2014
- S. Boldrini, "Uno stemmario milanese affrescato: lo scalone delle arme di Palazzo Arese Borromeo”, in “Quaderni di Palazzo Arese Borromeo”, Anno II /N°. 2, Novembre 2009.
- A. Spiriti, “Il Testamento di Bartolomeo III Arese”, DICOM Varese, 2004.
- P. Pissavino – G. Signorotto, “Lombardia borromaica, Lombardia spagnola”, Bulzoni Editore, 1995.
- G. Gualdo Priorato, Relatione della città e stato di Milano sotto il governo dell'ecc.mo sig. don Luigi de Guzman Ponze di Leone, Milano 1666
