= Palazzo Arese =

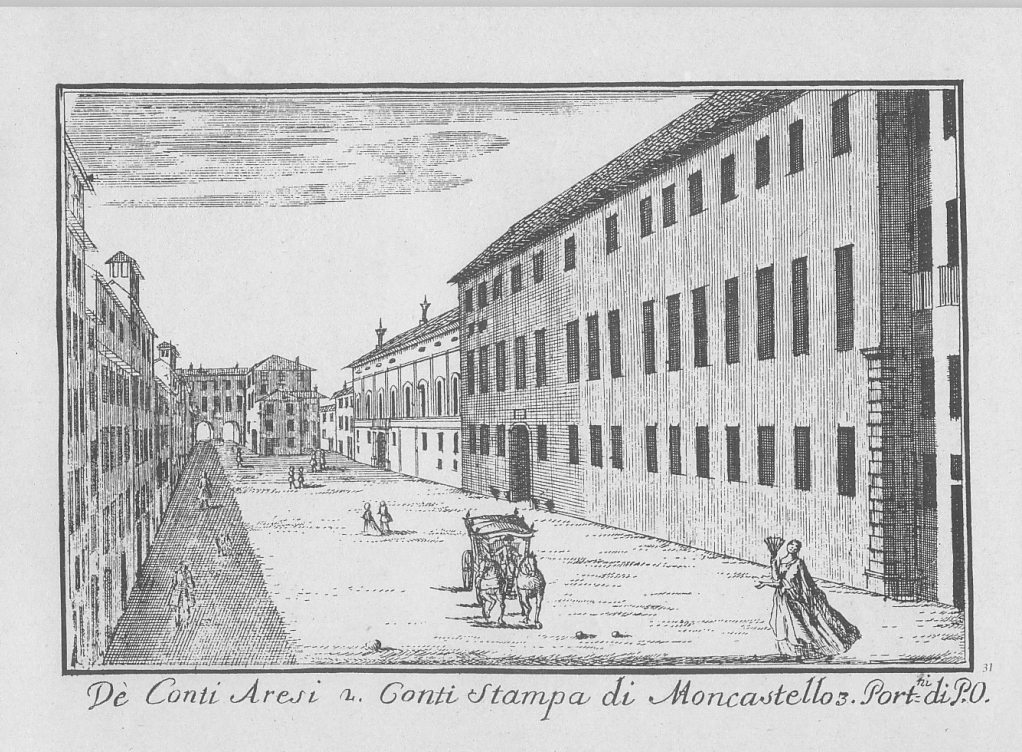
- Palazzo Arese in 1745, followed by Casa Fontana-Silvestri. Engraving by Marc'Antonio Dal Re

General information
- Location: Porta Orientale (8 Corso Venezia)
- Town or city: Milan
- Destroyed: 1943

Palazzo Arese (also known as Palazzo Arese Lucini and Palazzo Arese Pallavicini) was a 16th century baroque palace and seat of a branch of the House of Arese in Milan, Italy. It was located adjacent to Casa Fontana Silvestri near the Porta Orientale (today Corso Venezia n°8). The palazzo was demolished in 1943 following damage sustained during the bombing of Milan in World War II.

Between 1565 and 1571 the Serbelloni family bought and demolished several houses on the site and originally built the palace in the baroque style. On 13 October 1679, Marco Arese (1637-1695), senator, supreme regent of the Council of Italy, and president of the ordinary magistrate, bought the property from Carlo Francesco Serbelloni, exchanging it in part with a palace and other buildings once belonging to Bartolomeo III Arese. From 1679 the home hosted the governor of the State of Milan, Paolo Spinola, marquis de los Balbases, count of Melgar. The facade was remodelled in the neoclassical style between 1810 and 1814 by Innocente Domenico Giusti on the recommendation of city authorities and the Napoleonic viceroy as part of the renovation of the Corso di Porta Orientale.

General Giovanni Francesco Arese (1642 – 1721) displayed his notable collection of paintings in the house, including works by Rubens, Titian, van Dyck, Ribera, Bronzino, Parmigianino, and Moroni. Much of the collection was sold in 1812, during the building's renovation, to Prince Eugène de Beauharnais, viceroy of the Kingdom of Italy. In this same period, the palazzo was home to Antonietta Fagnani Arese (1778–1847), the subject of Ugo Foscolo's ode "All'amica risanata." Foscolo describes the palazzo in numerous letters to the countess of Barlassina.

During the air raids of 1943, much of the interior of the building was seriously damaged by a fire, while the external architecture of the courtyard and the monumental staircase were only slightly damaged. The current building at 8 Corso Venezia is said to retain one of Palazzo's neoclassical balconies in its facade.

== Gallery ==
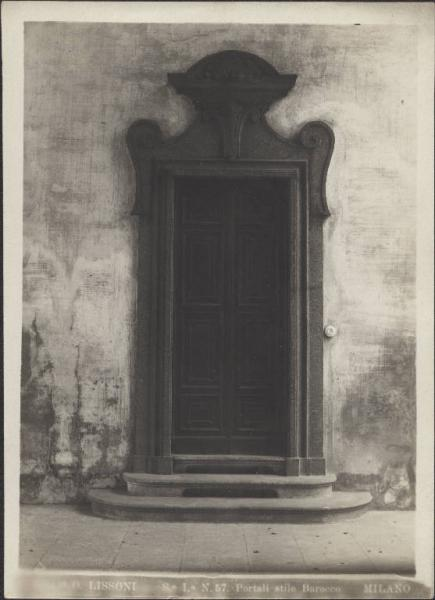
Osvaldo Lissoni, A door of Palazzo Arese Pallavicini, 1911–1917, Milan, Italy

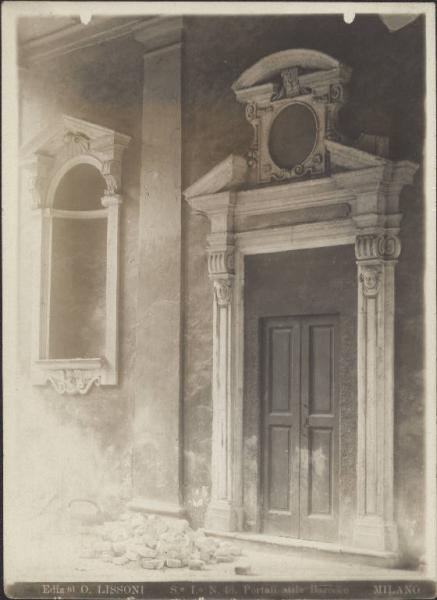
Osvaldo Lissoni, A door of Palazzo Arese Pallavicini, 1924–1925, Milan, Italy

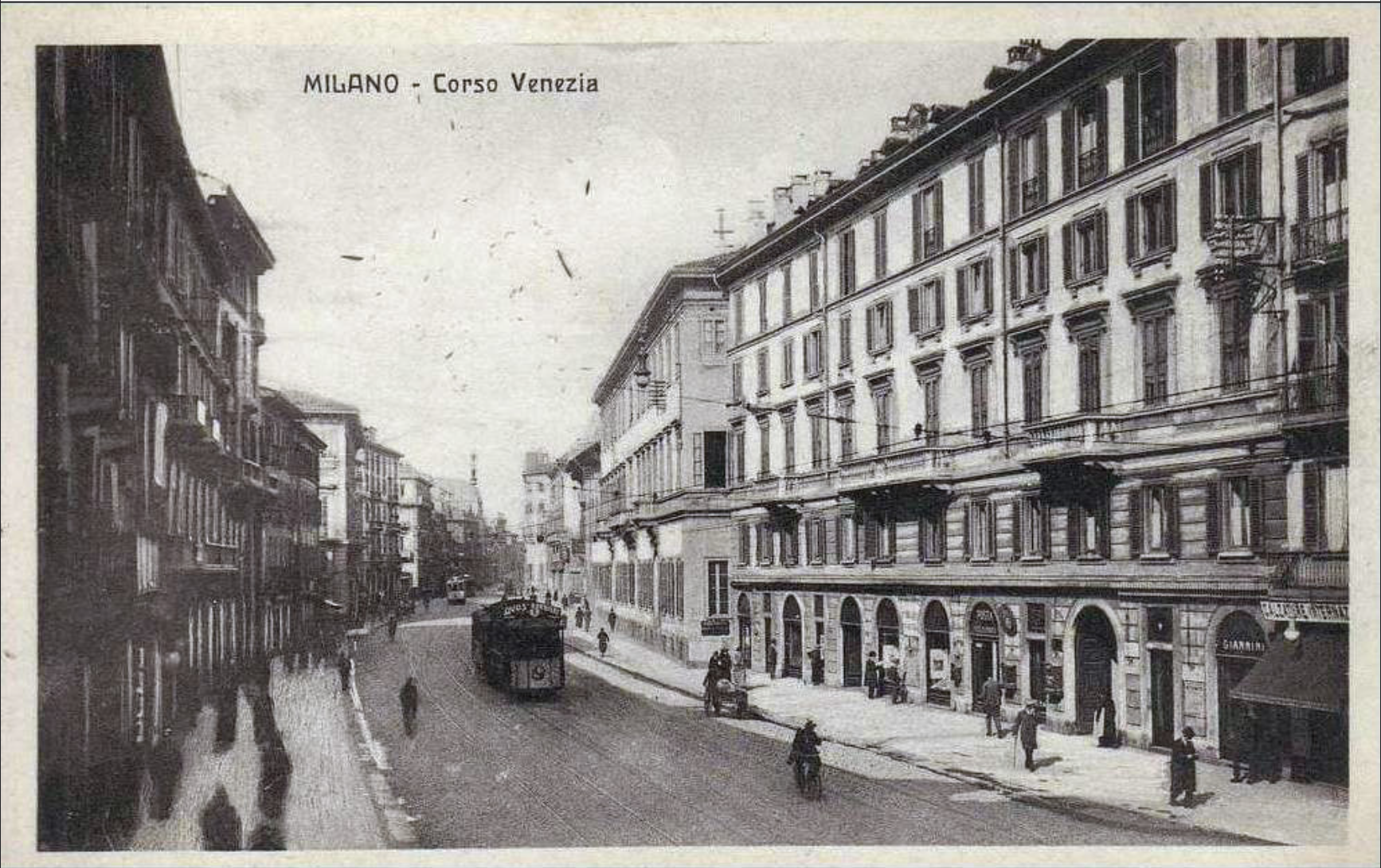
Corso Venezia with Palazzo Arese in the background

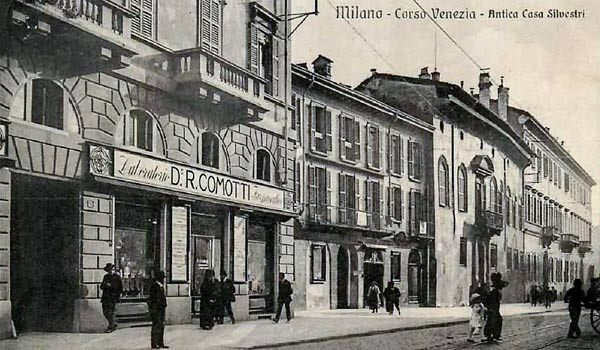
Corso Venezia with Casa Fontana Silvestri and Palazzo Arese behind it.
