= Francesco Benedetto Arese Lucini =

Senator of the Kingdom of Italy

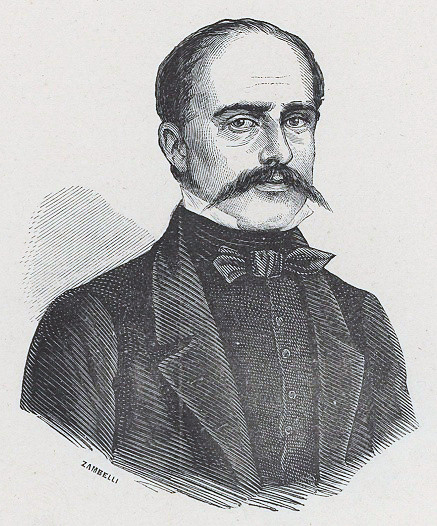
Aristide Calani, Portrait of Francesco Arese Lucini, Il Parlamento del Regno d'Italia, 1861

Francesco Benedetto Arese Lucini, count of Barlassina (14 August 1805 in Milan – 25 May 1881 in Florence) was a key figure of Italian unification, senator of the Kingdom of Italy, knight of the Supreme Order of the Most Holy Annunciation, son of Antonietta Fagnani Arese, and nephew of Francesco Teodoro Arese Lucini.

A descendant of the historic Milanese Arese family, Francesco authored A trip to the prairies and in the interior of North America 1837-1838, a diary of his journey with childhood friend Luis Napoleon Bonaparte, later Napoleone III. He was unofficial ambassador of Count Camillo Cavour in Paris during establishment of the Kingdom of Italy, negotiating concession of Nice and Savoy to France.
