= Palazzo Litta, Milan =

Palace in Milan, Italy

Palazzo Litta
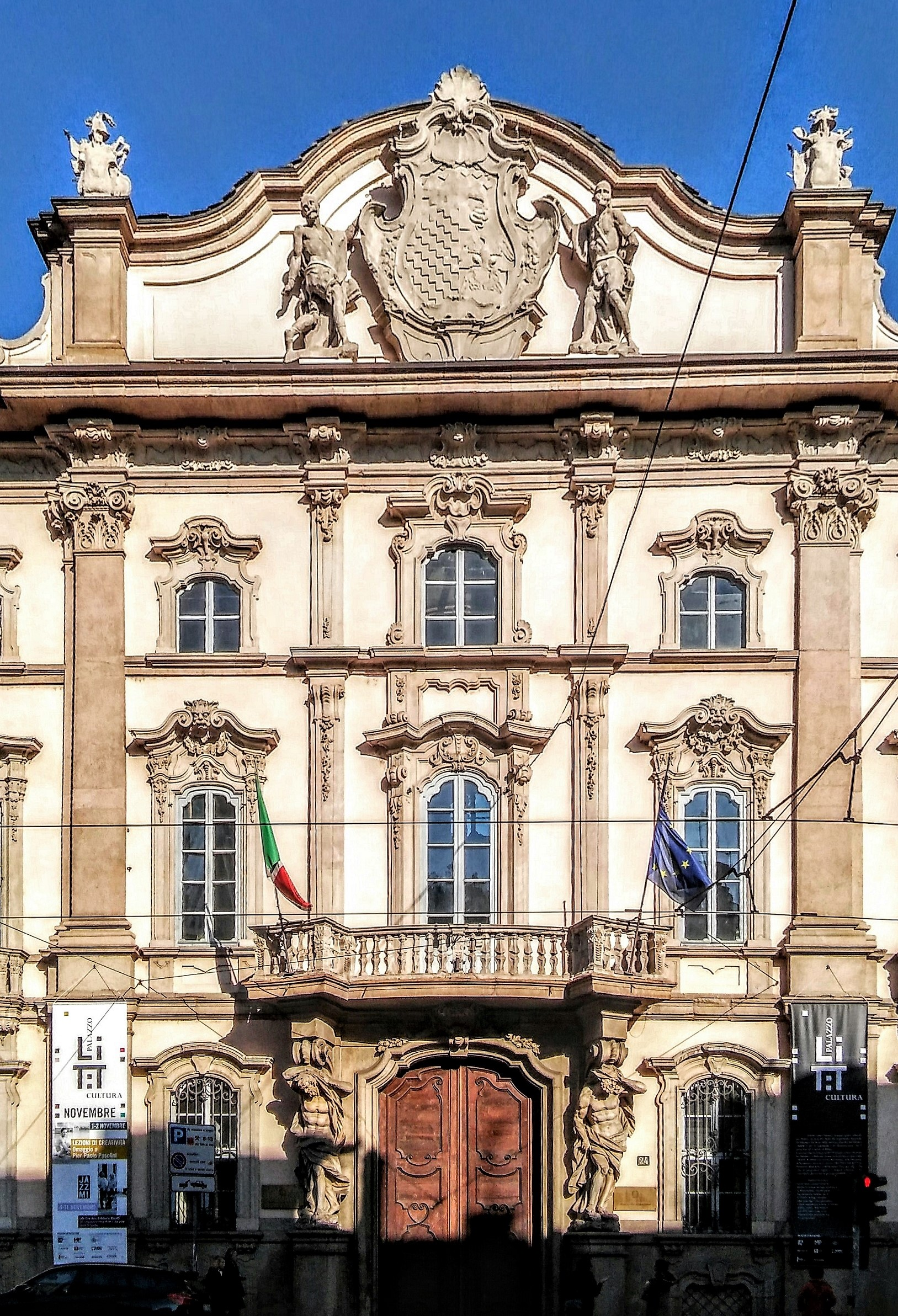
- Central portion of the rococo facade
- Interactive map of the Palazzo Litta area

General information
- Architectural style: Baroque
- Location: Corso Magenta, Milan, Italy
- Coordinates: 45.466053°N 9.178154°E
- Construction started: 1642
- Completed: 1761 (façade)
- Client: Bartolomeo Arese

Design and construction
- Architect: Francesco Maria Richini

The Palazzo Litta, also known as the Palazzo Arese-Litta, is a Baroque structure in Milan, northern Italy, opposite San Maurizio al Monastero Maggiore, and dating from the period of Spanish rule of the city. In 2018, it served as a cultural center, housing exhibition spaces, offices, and a theater.

== History ==
Architect Francesco Maria Richini built the nucleus of the palazzo in the years 1642–1648 for Count Bartolomeo Arese, a member of the Arese family, one of the most influential Milanese families of the period, who became President of the Senate of Milan in 1660. Palazzo Litta thus became an important cultural centre. Grand parties held here over the years included receptions for Archduchess Mariana of Austria, for Margaret Theresa of Spain, for Elisabeth Christine of Brunswick-Wolfenbüttel, for Maria Theresa of Austria, for Eugène de Beauharnais and for the arrival of Napoleon in Milan.

Apart from its general plan, the principal features which remain essentially intact from the original seventeenth-century building are the piano nobile (although largely redecorated) and one of Richini’s courtyards. The family oratory, also the work of Richini, and consecrated in 1671, was later turned into a private theatre for the use of the family and its invitees. The theatre, the oldest in Milan, is still in use as the Teatro Litta di Milano, which also has a second performance space located in the old stable block.

In 1674 the palazzo passed to Bartolomeo’s daughter Margherita, wife of Fabio III Visconti Borromeo Arese; towards the middle of the eighteenth century, when his branch of the Arese became extinct in the male line, it was inherited by the Litta family, whose members were also prominent in the political life of the city. It was in this period that a number of important changes were made to the building. By the late 19th century, it had become the home of the Railroad Administration of Northern Italy.

== Architecture ==
Between 1752 and 1761 Bartolomeo Bolli constructed a new façade for the building, highly decorated in a late Baroque, or Rococò, manner. The entrance is flanked by two atlantes, supporting a contorted balcony. In 1740, Carlo Giuseppe Merlo built the imposing and scenographic forked staircase (a scalone a tenaglia) whose sophisticated curves lead to the apartments of the piano nobile. These too were refurbished in part, a number being decorated with murals by Giovanni Antonio Cucchi.
