= Federico Bianchi =

Italian painter (1635–1719)

Federico Bianchi (1635–1719) was an Italian painter of the Baroque period, active in North Lombardy.

== Biography ==
He was born in Masnago near Varese, and died in Milan. He was a pupil, and subsequently son-in-law, of Giulio Cesare Procaccini. By the early age of seventeen he painted three works in fresco for the cloister of the monastery of the Padri Zoccolanti at Milan and the Certosa di Pavia. Several other works by this master were for the churches of that city. He was patronised by the duke of Savoy, and honoured him with the title of Cavalière, and a gold chain and medal. Bianchi was noted for his history paintings, portraits, landscapes, and paintings of animals.

Among his works are paintings for Sant'Alessandro in Milan, frescoes for Villa Litta Modignani in Biumo Inferiore in the town of Varese, and for the Palazzo Arese Borromeo of Cesano Maderno.

Among his pupils was Pietro Gilardi (born in 1679 in Milan).
