= Palazzo Arese Borromeo =

Palazzo in Cesano Maderno, Italy

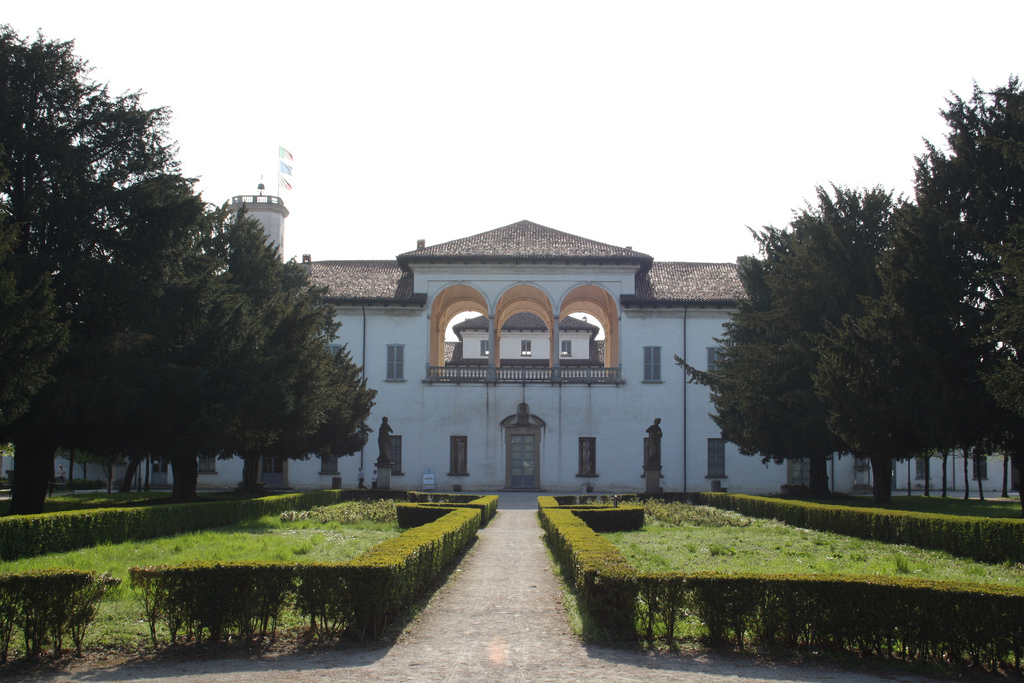
- Façade on the garden
- Interactive map of the Palazzo Arese Borromeo area

General information
- Status: University of San Raffaele Faculty of Philosophy
- Architectural style: Baroque
- Location: via Borromeo 41, Cesano Maderno, Italy
- Coordinates: 45°37′43″N 9°08′52″E
- Construction started: 1626
- Completed: 1670 circa
- Client: Bartolomeo III Arese

Palazzo Arese Borromeo is an historic noble palace situated in Cesano Maderno, in the Province of Monza and Brianze, Lombardy, Italy.

== Background ==
The northern wing of the palazzo was built in the 16th century by Bartolomeo il Vecchio (1508–1562). Giulio I Arese (1575-1627) began expansions around 1620. The largest parts of the palazzo were built between 1654 and 1670 by count Bartolomeo III Arese, then president of the Senate of Milan under rule of Philip IV and Charles II of Spain, turning the countryside villa into an exemplary suburban noble residence for the House of Arese.

The palazzo is currently property of the comune of Cesano Maderno.

The interiors of the palazzo are visitable thanks to guided tours, while the park is public.

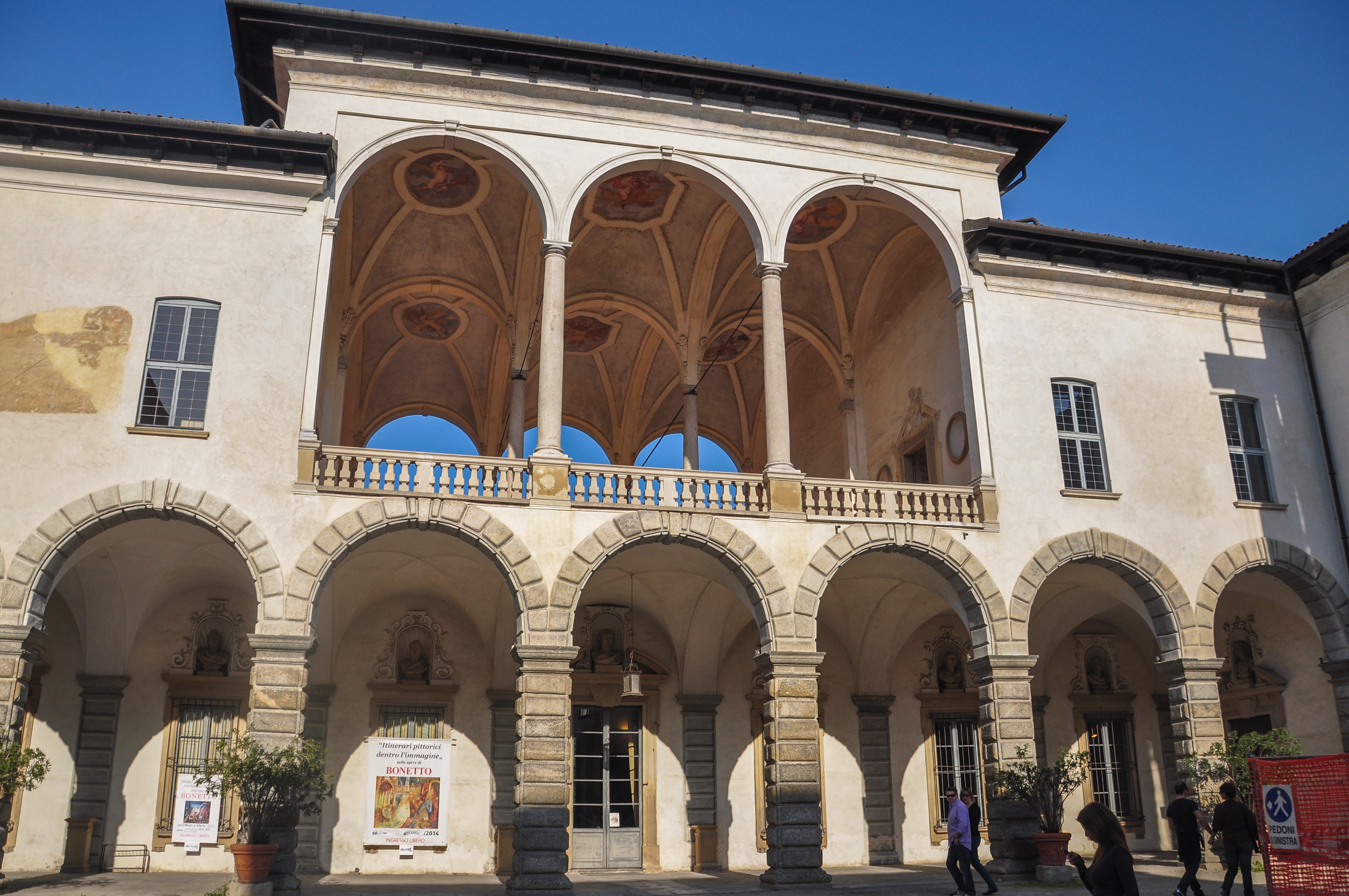
Genovese loggia in the internal court yard

== Description ==
=== Architecture ===
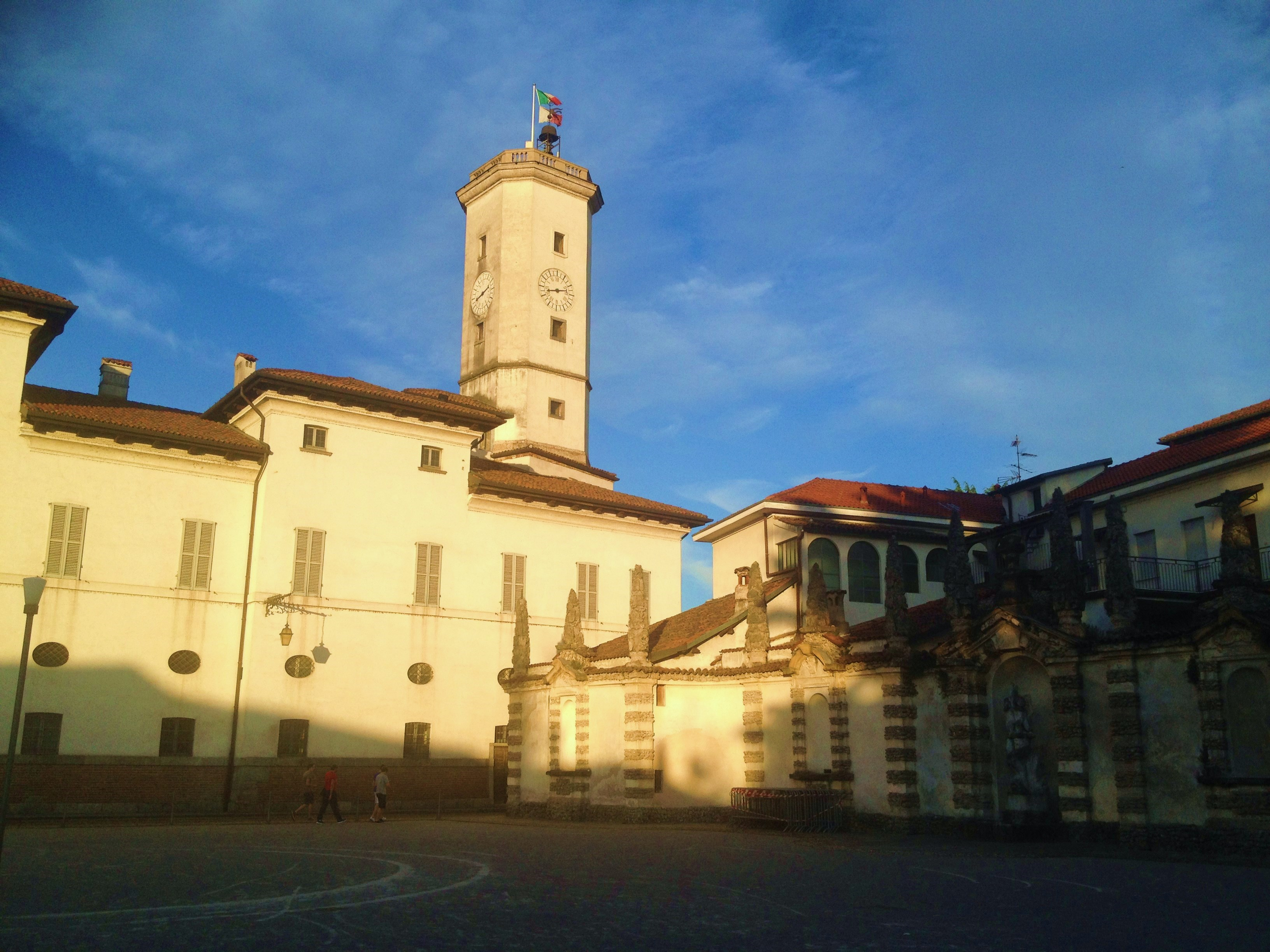
View of the facade from the exedra with hexagonal tower

The residence remains as it was built by Bartolomeo III. The project of the palazzo must be read as part of a more complex urban planning project, with the function of giving the new nobile residence maximum visibility in the region of Cesano.

The palazzo is in late baroque Lombard style, and is notable for its Genovese loggia, its internal court yard, and its gardens all'Italiana. The building has a quadrangular structure, flanked by service buildings. The principle facade is composed of an exedra and doric pilasters. In the northern wing there is a chapel, and In the southern wing there is a tower, built upon the remains of its medieval predecessor.

=== Interiors ===
The palazzo is lined with frescos by the most prominent Milanese baroque artists, including Ercole Procaccini the Younger, the Montalto brothers, Antonio Busca, Giovanni Ghisolfi, Giuseppe Nuvolone, and Federico Bianchi. The painted cycles are part of a complex iconographic project, involving recreated landscapes and mythology, to communicate the economic and political power of the House of Arese under Spanish Habsburg rule.

==== The Salone d'Onore dei Fasti Romani ====
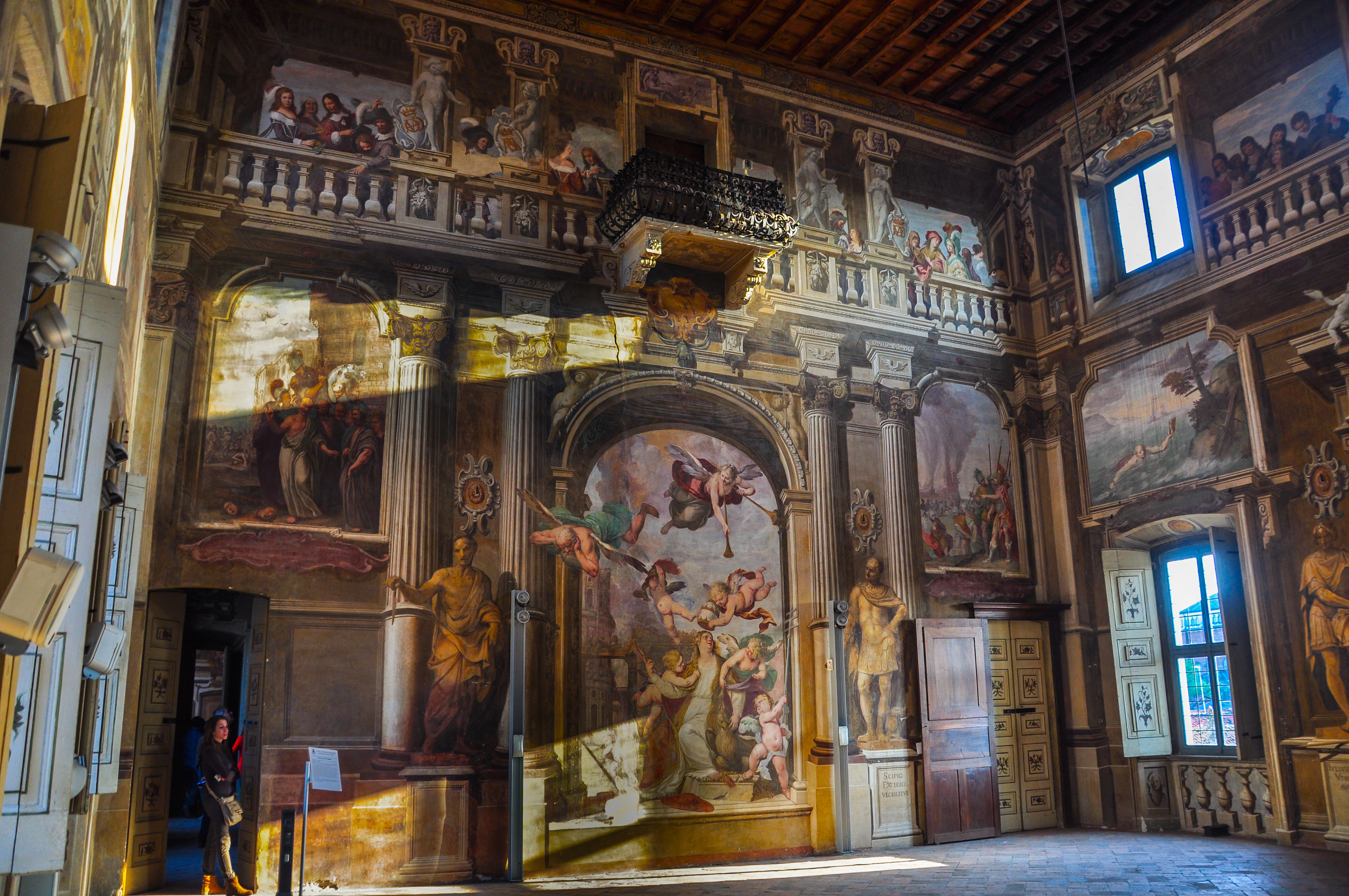
The Salone dei Fasti Romani

The most important room in the palazzo is the Salone d'Onore, also known as Salone of the Fasti Romani. Its frescos consist of two bands: the inferior band depicts the history of Rome, and the superior band displays dames and signori, musicians, servants, and mendicants peering over a balustrade.

=== Gardens and nymphaeum ===
The gardens are composed of a large natural park, large fountains, a nymphaeum, an ancient example of an ice house, and a more private giardino all'Italiana on the northern side.

== Gallery ==
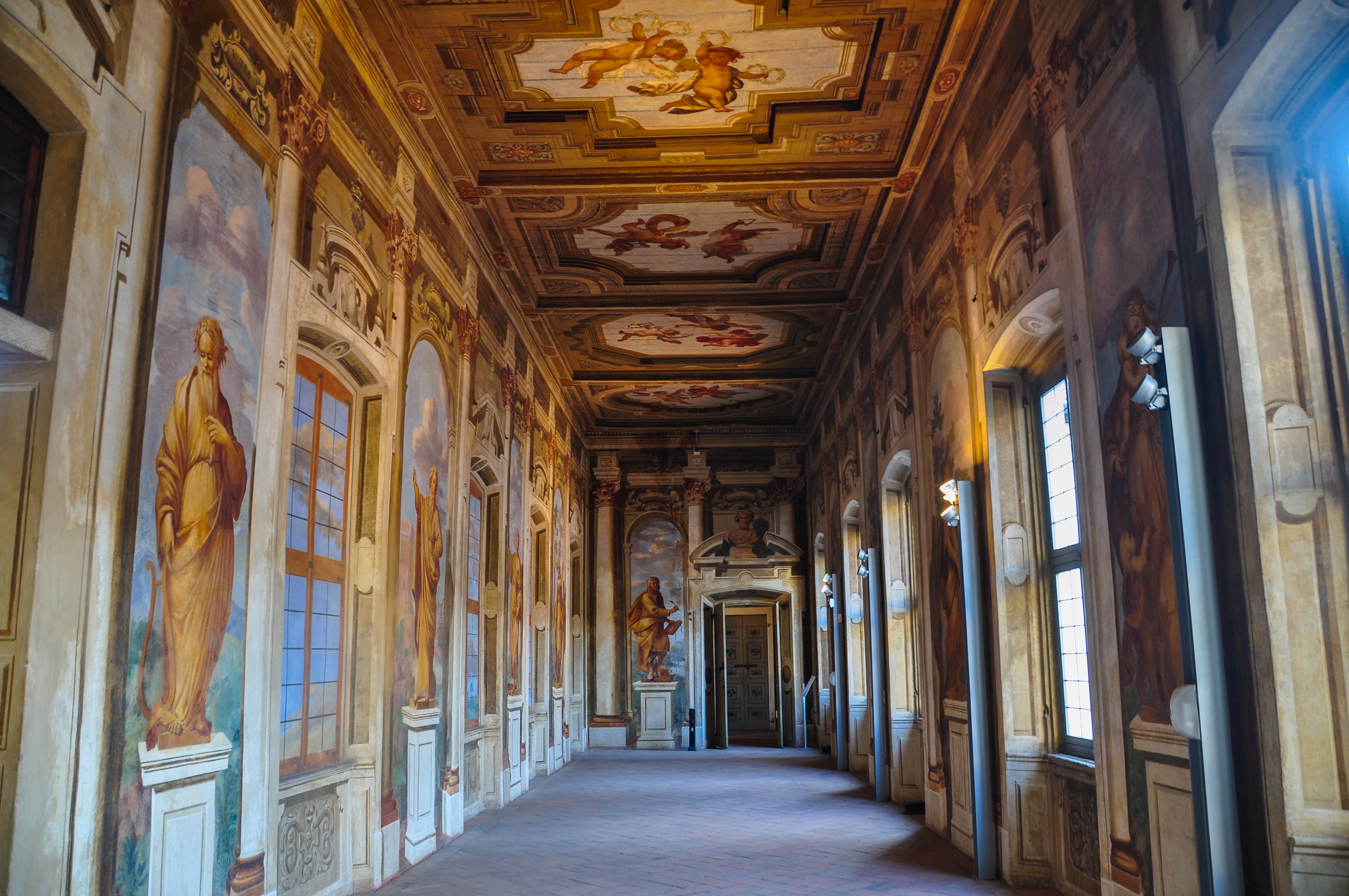
The Gallery of the Liberal Arts

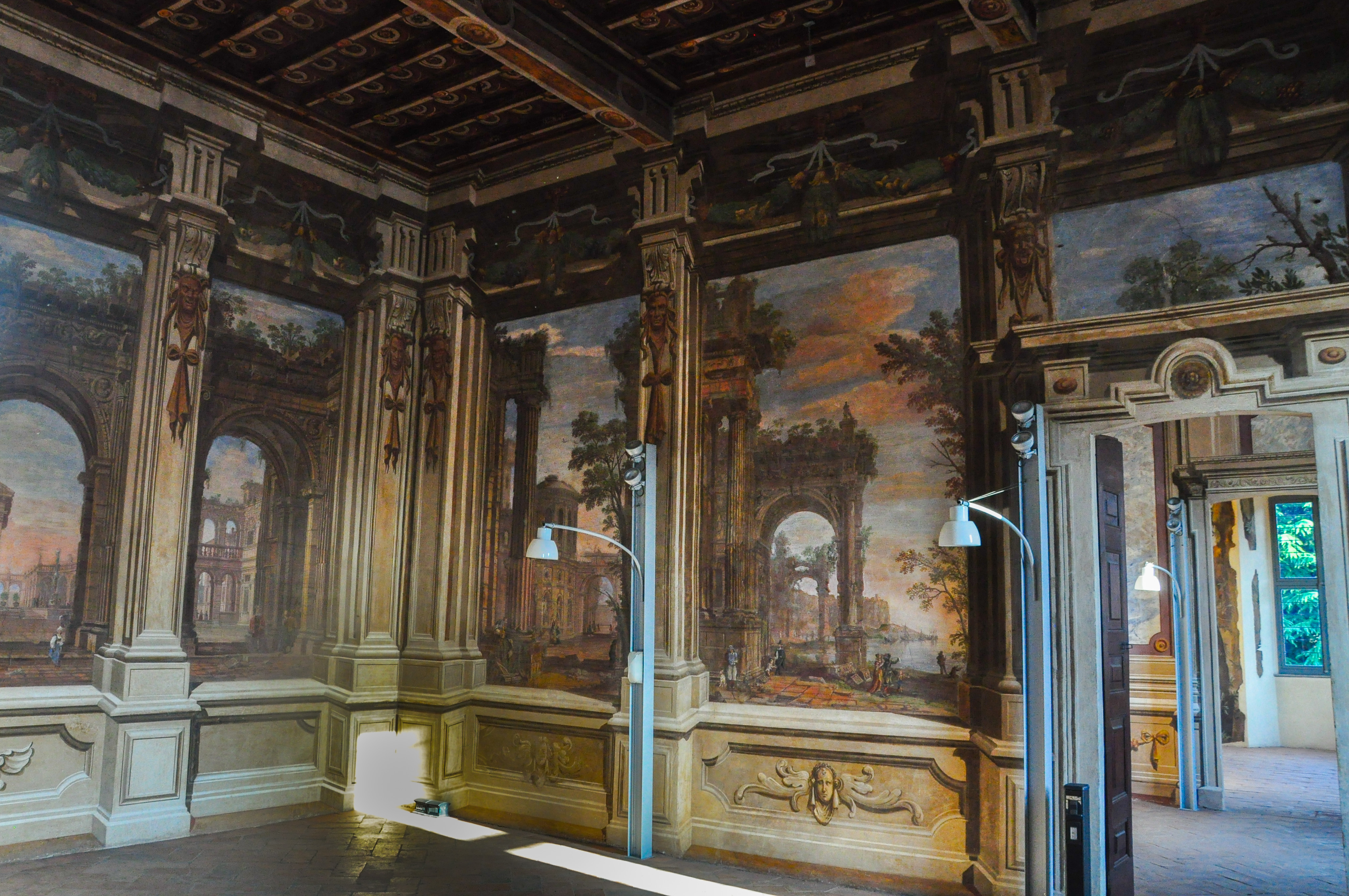
A hall in the piano nobile

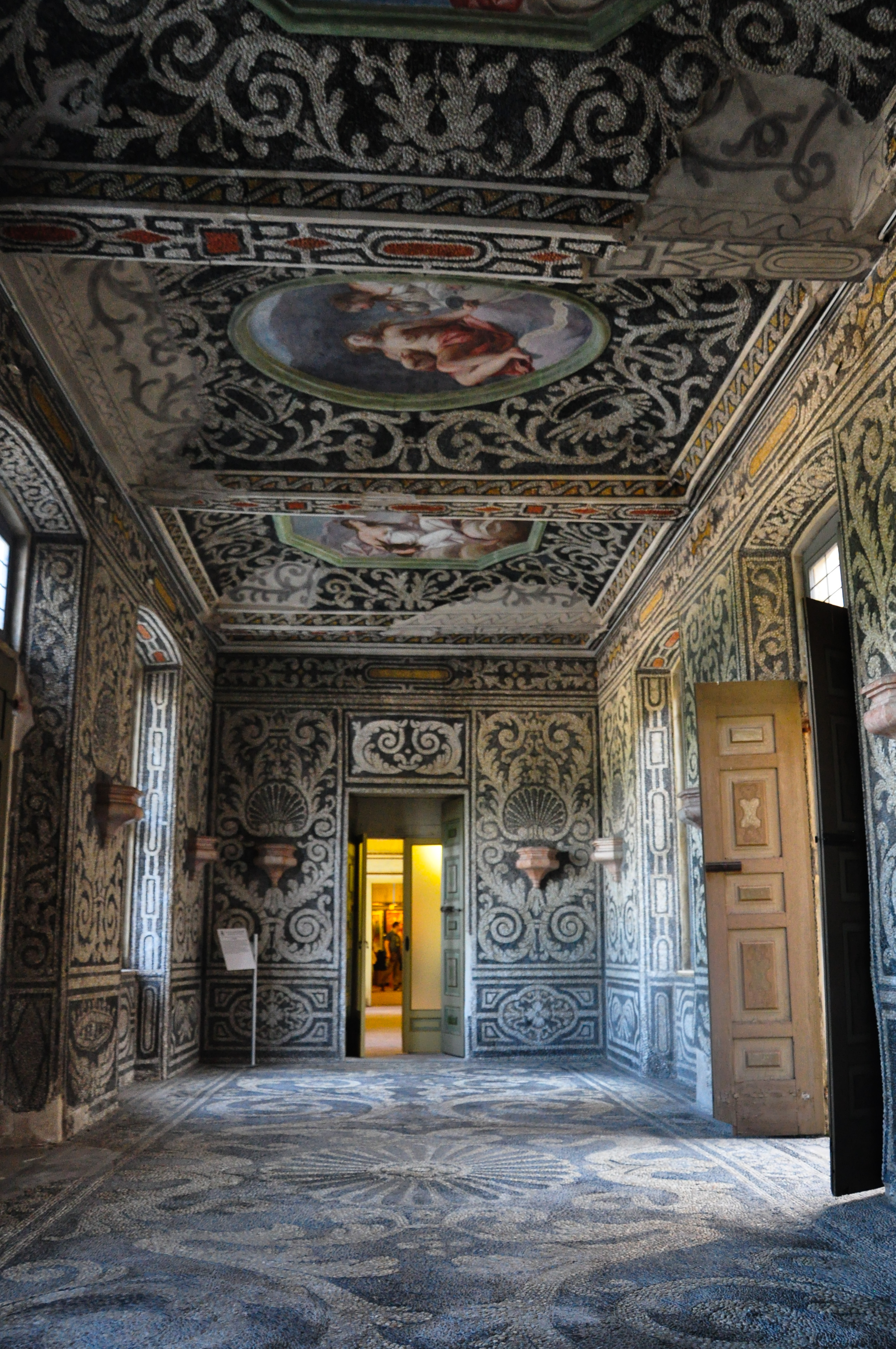
The Nymphaeum

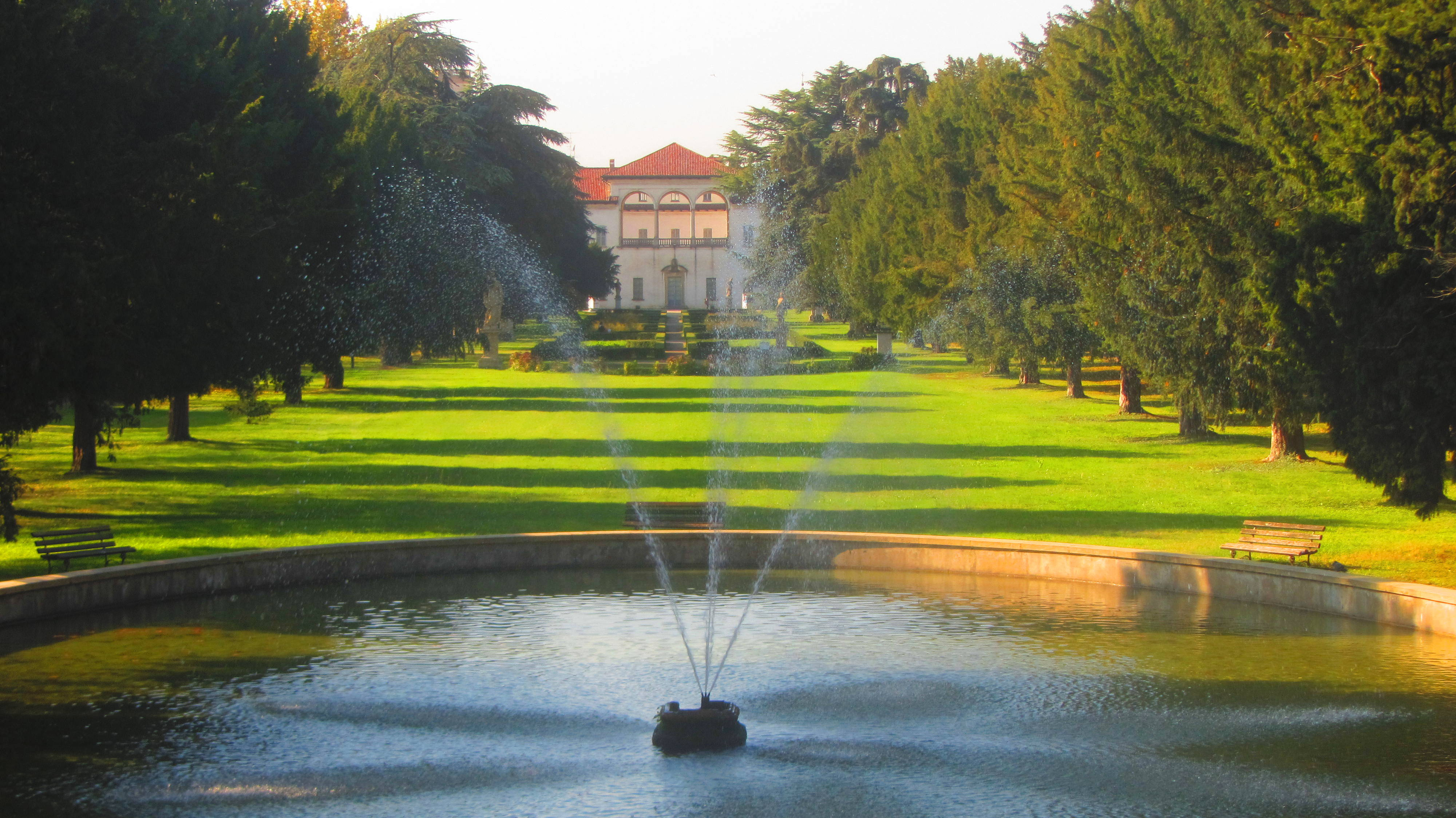
View of the Arese Borromeo park

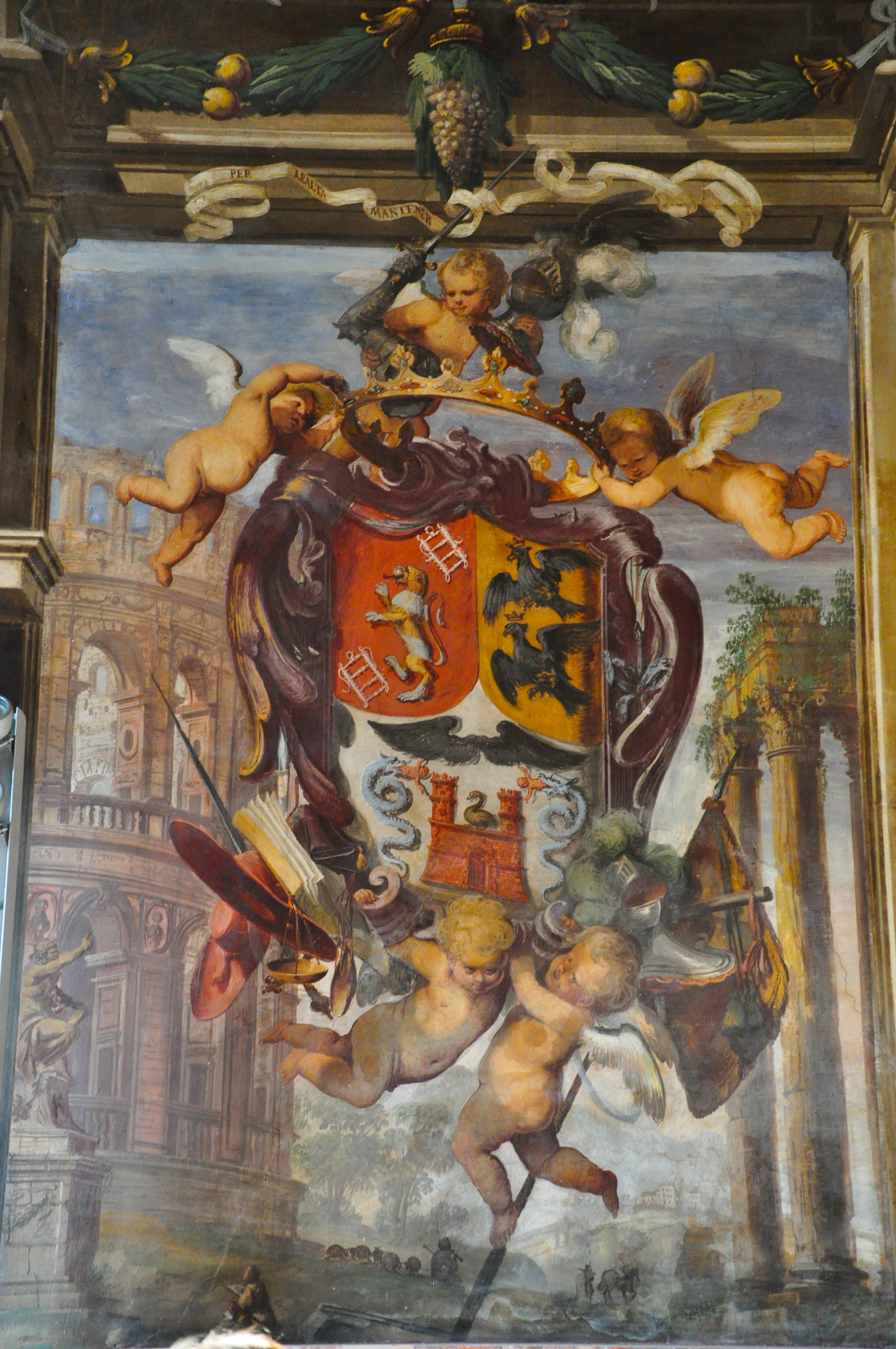
Emblem of the Arese with Omodei, Borromeo and Visconti in Palazzo Arese Borromeo (Cesano Maderno)

== Sources ==
- Ronzoni, Domenico Flavio; Magni, Ketty (November 2006). La ghiacciaia di palazzo Arese Borromeo a Cesano Maderno [The ice house in Palazzo Arese Borromeo in Cesano Maderno]. Tesori di Lombardia (in Italian). Missaglia: Bellavite. ISBN 978-88-7511-067-3.
