= Antonietta Fagnani Arese =

Milanese noblewoman and translator

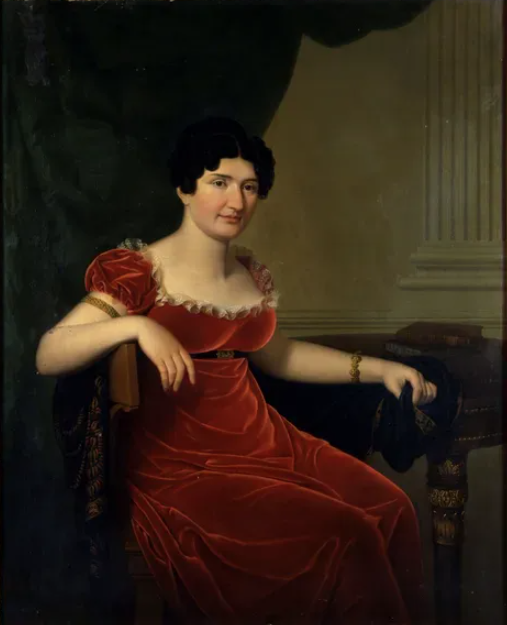
Antonietta Fagnani Arese

Antonia Barbara Giulia Faustina Angiola Lucia Fagnani Arese (née Fagnani; Milan, 19 November 1778 – Genoa, 11 December 1847), nicknamed Antonietta, was a Milanese noblewoman, translator of Goethe, and correspondent of Ugo Foscolo.

== Biography ==
She was the youngest child of Giacomo Fagnani (1740–1785) and Costanza Brusati Settala (1747–1805), sister of Maria Emilia Fagnani, later Marchioness of Hertford. She married Marco Arese Lucini, 6th Count of Barlassina of the Arese family, son of Benedetto Arese Lucini and Margherita Lucini of the Marquis of Besate, on 20 February 1798 at Santa Maria alla Porta in Milan. They had five children, three of whom survived: Margherita (1798–1828), Costanza (1803–1822), and Francesco (1805–1881).

Antonietta was one of the most notable figures of Milanese society in the Napoleonic era. Close friends with Hortense de Beauharnais, Queen of the Netherlands, whose son became Napoleon III, she was active in the court of her brother Eugène de Beauharnais, Viceroy of the Napoleonic Kingdom of Italy.

Fluent in French, English, and German, she translated The Sorrows of Young Werther by Goethe into Italian and helped Ugo Foscolo with his revisions of The Last Letters of Jacopo Ortis (1802).

== Relationship with Ugo Foscolo ==
Her relationship with Foscolo likely began in July 1801. The poet dedicated his ode All'amica risanata ('To the healed friend') to her, stating "Oh how beautiful you were that evening! How many times I retracted my eyes full of fear! Yes, my fantasy and my heart began to create of you a divinity," ("E com'eri tu bella questa sera! Quante volte ho ritirati i miei occhi pieni di spavento! Sì, la mia fantasia e il mio cuore cominciano a crearsi di te una divinità.")

By 4 March 1803, their relationship had ended, with Foscolo writing that Antonietta "had a heart made of brain" ("aveva il cuore fatto di cervello"). This passage is cited by Benedetto Croce in The Essence of Aesthetics to demonstrate art presupposing logic in his Philosophy of the Spirit.

Their relationship is known through his letters, which present an interesting literary case. Antonietta returned Foscolo's letters to him after their relations had ended, and the poet then entrusted them to Silvio Pellico. After Pellico's arrest the letters passed through various hands, including the Italo-Greek writer Emilio De Tipaldo. De Tipaldo created two apographa, which ended up with the Barbèra Editorial House. The originals, likely in Greece, have never been found.

== Death ==
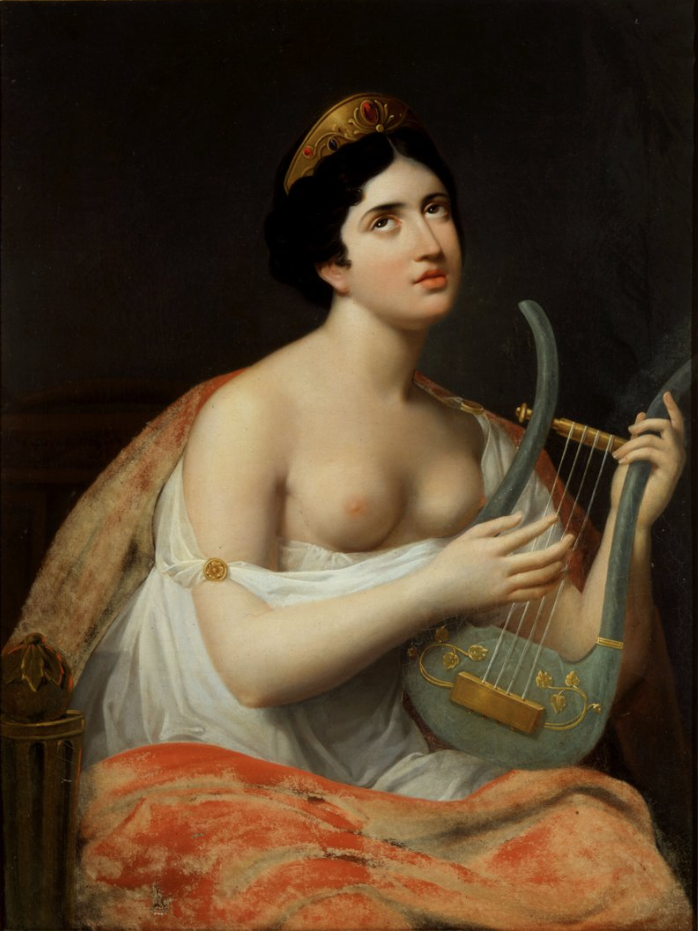
Portrait of Antonietta Fagnani Arese (1778-1847) by Carlo Bruni

Having contracted a grave disease, in October 1847 she moved to Genoa to heal but soon died. Her remains are buried at the church of San Babila in Milan.

A Milanese legend tells that at a full moon the ghost of Antonietta, as protector of lovers, would appear on the balcony of Palazzo Arese at 8 corso Venezia. After the building's demolition in 1943, following damage suffered by bombings in the second World War, the palazzo's original neoclassical balcony was saved and included in the facade of a modern building.

== Contemporary testimonies ==
Antonietta's reputation was often one of controversy: Stendhal referred to her as a femme de génie, Vincenzo Monti admired her greatly, and Giuseppe Pecchio, biographer of Foscolo, wrote: "She makes a game of men because she believes them born like roosters, made for loving, jealousy, and scuffles" ("Si fa gioco degli uomini perché li crede nati come i galli per amare, ingelosirsi e azzuffarsi")

Giuseppe Rovani, in his masterwork Cento anni, wrote: "most beautiful of beauties, she had much spirit, much ingenuity, much culture (she spoke four languages); she was kind, generous, and affable; in sum, she constituted the rare combination of egrege qualities; but all of them seemed to fall apart under the hurricane of her one defect. She made love her only pastime; but a pastime that was tumultuous, quivering, restless; one must say that this love was parent of that which remained naked in Greece, as Foscolo said" ("bellissima fra le belle, aveva molto spirito, molto ingegno, molta coltura (parlava quattro lingue); era buona, generosa e affabile; costituiva insomma il complesso rarissimo di egrege qualità; ma tutte parevano sfasciarsi sotto l'uragano di un difetto solo. Ella faceva dell'amore l'unico passatempo; ma un passatempo tumultuoso, fremebondo, irrequieto; né occorre il dire che quell'amore era parente di quello rimasto nudo in Grecia, come disse Foscolo".
