= Bartolomeo Arese, il Vecchio =

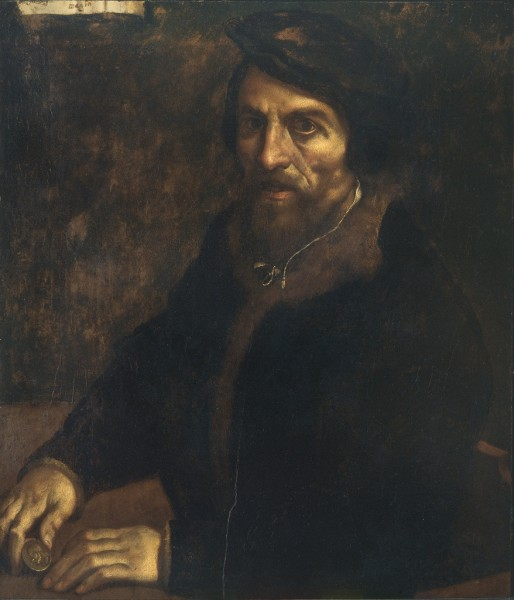
Antonio Campi, Portrait of Bartolomeo Arese, il Vecchio, 1560–1570. Pinacoteca di Brera, Milan.

Bartolomeo II Arese, il Vecchio (1508–1562) was Treasurer-General for the Duchy of Milan under Francesco II Sforza and Signore of the Pieve of Seveso.

Descended from the Arese family, Bartolomeo was Royal Exchequer for Military pay and later treasurer of Milan during the fall of the Sforza and the rise of Spanish Habsburg control of Milan. In 1538 Bartolomeo il Vecchio acquired signoria of the Pieve of Seveso under Charles V, Holy Roman Emperor. Following the rule of Philip II, King of Spain, he laid the foundations for a century of governance of Milan and its domains by his descendants, Giulio I and Bartolomeo III.
