= Portrait of Count Arese in Prison =

Painting by Francesco Hayez

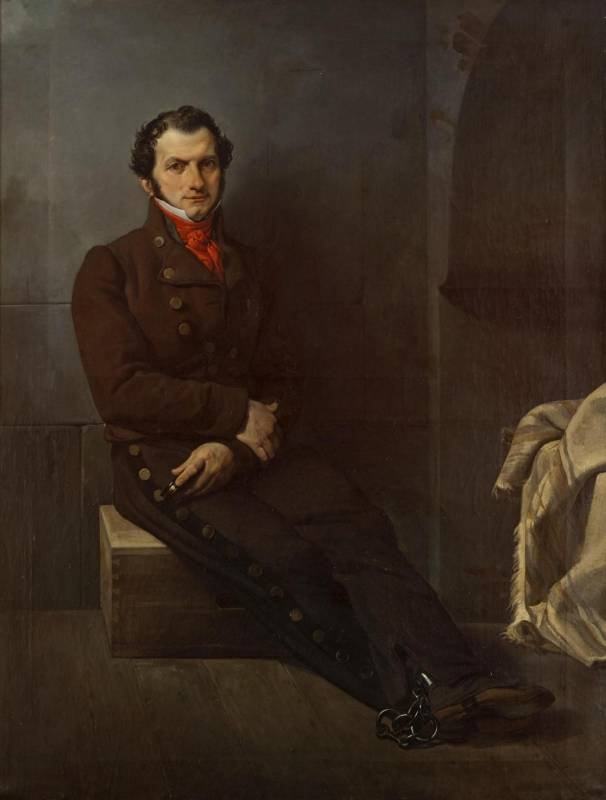
- Artist: Francesco Hayez
- Year: 1828
- Type: Oil on canvas, portrait painting
- Dimensions: 151 cm × 116 cm (59 in × 46 in)
- Location: Palazzo Pitti; Florence

Portrait of Count Arese in Prison (Italian: Ritratto del Conte Arese in carcere) is an 1828 portrait painting by the Italian artist Francesco Hayez. It depicts the aristocrat and supporter of Italian unification Francesco Teodoro Arese Lucini, who had been imprisoned by the Austrian authorities for three years in Špilberk Castle for his role in the 1821 Milan uprising.

The work was commissioned by Arese, who wanted to be depicted unconventionally as a victim of the Italian national cause by being portrayed in a bare prison cell with chains around his ankles. Since 2023 the painting has been in the collection of the Gallery of Modern Art in Florence.

== Bibliography ==
- Ascoli, Albert Russell & Von Henneberg, Krystyna Clara. Making and Remaking Italy: The Cultivation of National Identity Around the Risorgimento. Berg Publishers, 2001.
- Mazzocca, Fernando . Francesco Hayez: catalogo ragionato. F. Motta, 1994.
