= Palazzo Arese Bethlen =

Neoclassical palazzo in Milan destroyed in World War II

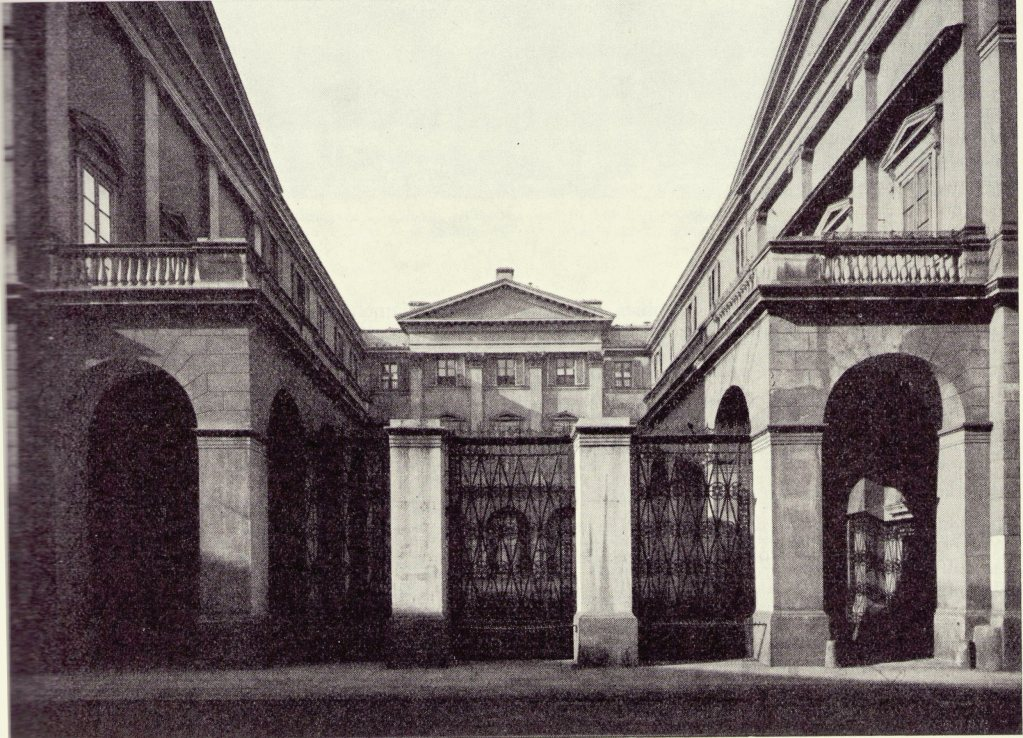
- view of central court yard and entry
- Interactive map of the Palazzo Arese Bethlen area

General information
- Status: Destroyed
- Location: via Monte di Pietà 11, Milan, Italy
- Coordinates: 45°28′10.67″N 9°11′25.84″E
- Construction started: 1828
- Destroyed: 1943
- Owner: Francesco Teodoro Arese Lucini

Palazzo Arese-Bethlen was a neoclassical palazzo in Milan situated on what is now via Monte di Pietà 11. It was destroyed in 1943 following the bombing of Milan in World War II.

== History ==
The palazzo was constructed in 1828 by Francesco Teodoro Arese Lucini, designed by Pelagio Pelagi. The home was built in the centre of Milan, on the large garden of the monastery of Sant Agostino Neri. After the death of count Arese the palazzo was sold to the Hungarian Bethlen family. Because of its central location and vast gardens, the building and grounds were eventually subdivided and sold to developers. When the Bethlen family abandoned the palazzo, it was divided into smaller apartments until it was demolished by developers following damage sustained in the bombing of Milan in World War II, even if this only damaged the central part of the construction and not its wings.

== Gallery ==
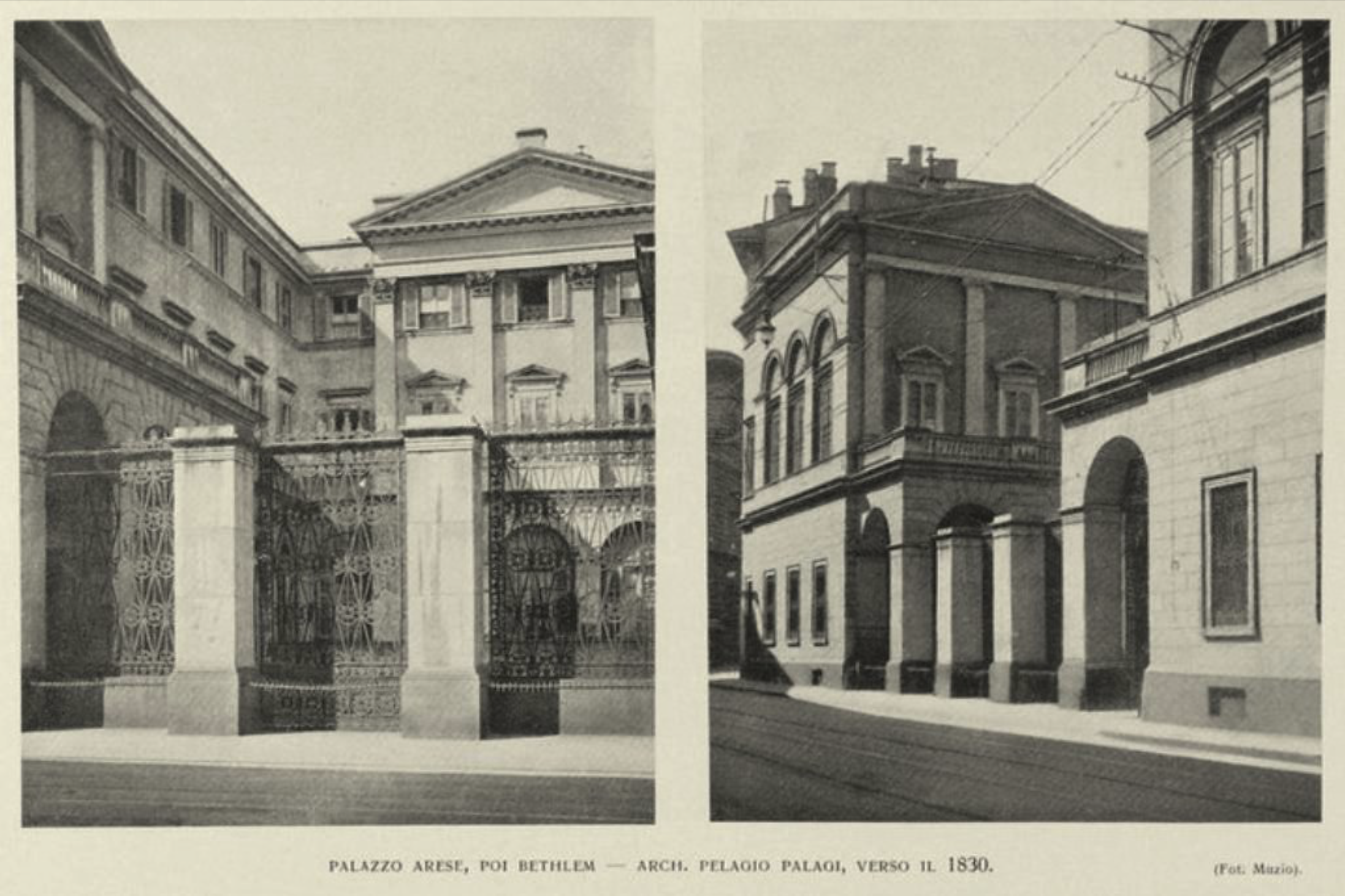
lateral wings of the palazzo

== See also ==
- Palazzo del Monte di Pietà (Milano)
