= Giberto Borromeo Arese =

Italian painter (1815–1885)

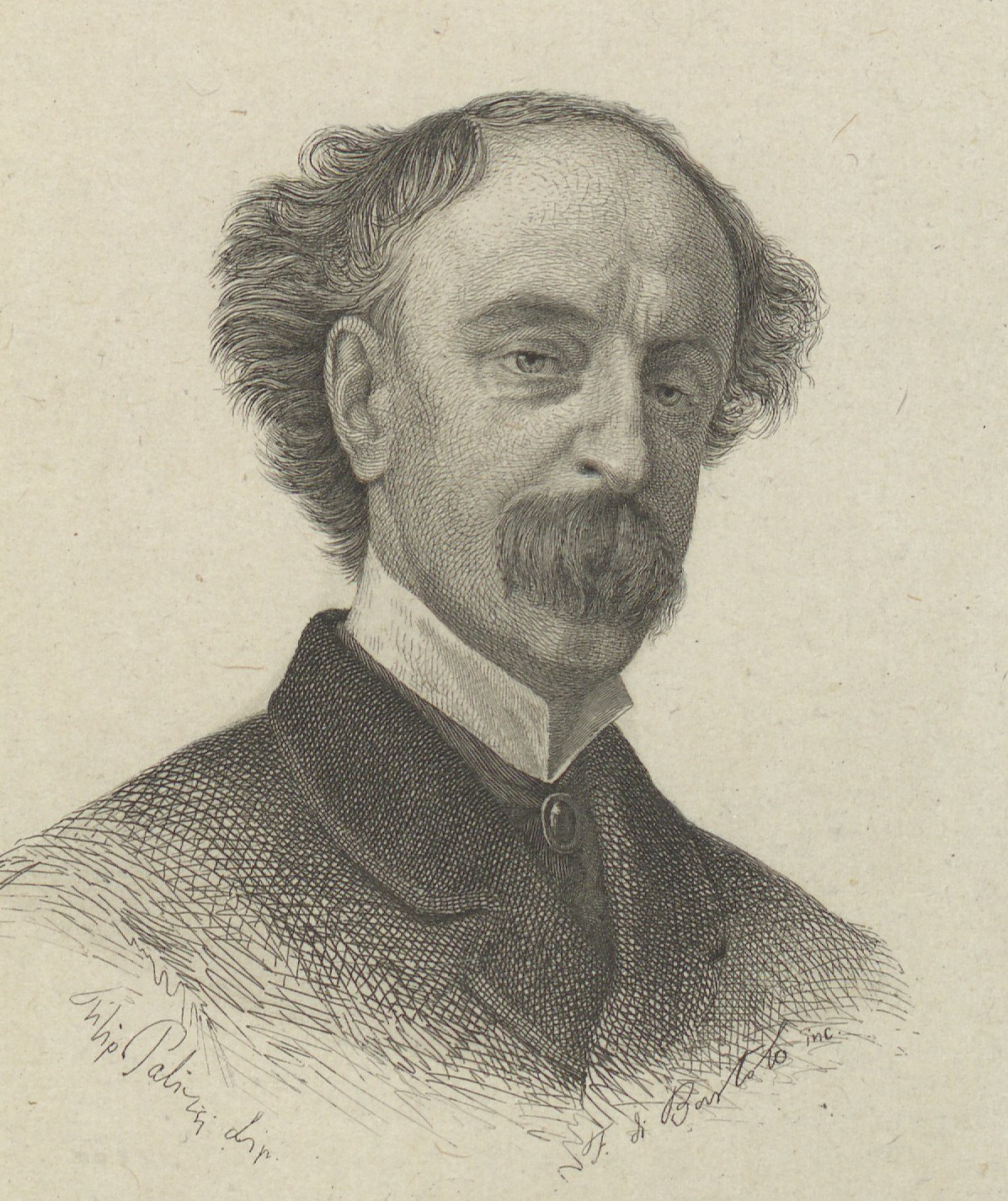
Portrait of Giberto Borromeo

Giberto Borromeo Arese (17 September 1815 - 23 May 1885) was an Italian aristocrat, painter, and patron of the arts.

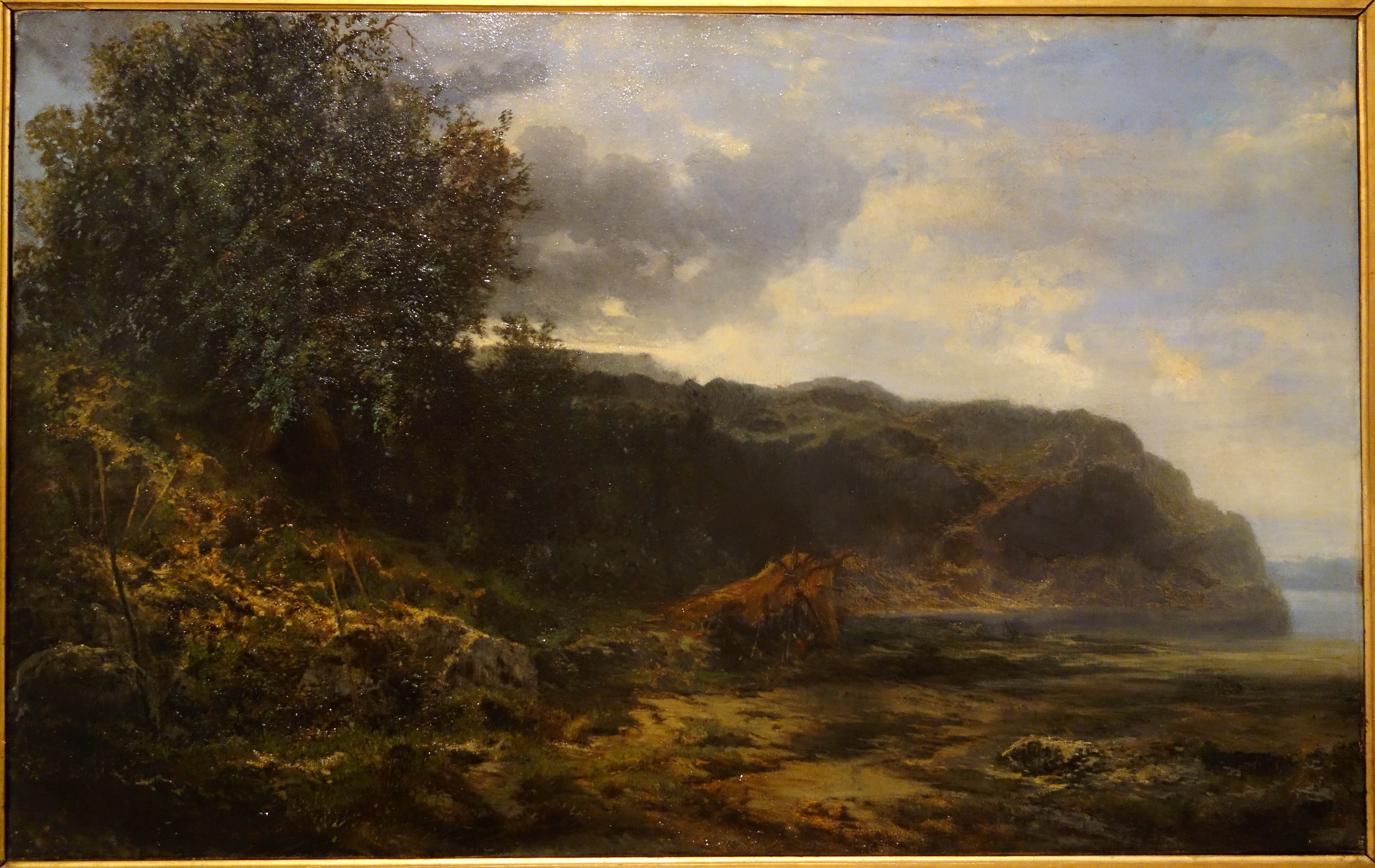
Landscape (Lake Maggiore) by Giberto Borromeo Arese, undated, oil on canvas. Accademia Ligustica di Belle Arti, Genoa.

Arese was born and died in Milan, the eldest son of Count Vitaliano and later as his heir. He completed his legal studies at the Collegio Borromeo in Pavia. He was a member of the Academies of Genoa, Turin, Naples, and Perugia, curator of the Biblioteca Ambrosiana, chair (September 1859 to June 1860) and then, until his death, counselor of the Brera Academy, and member of the board of directors of the Veneranda Fabbrica del Duomo di Milano. He was also a founder of the Società Storica Lombarda, serving as its president from January 1874 to December 1877.
