= Bartolomeo III Arese =

Italian Count

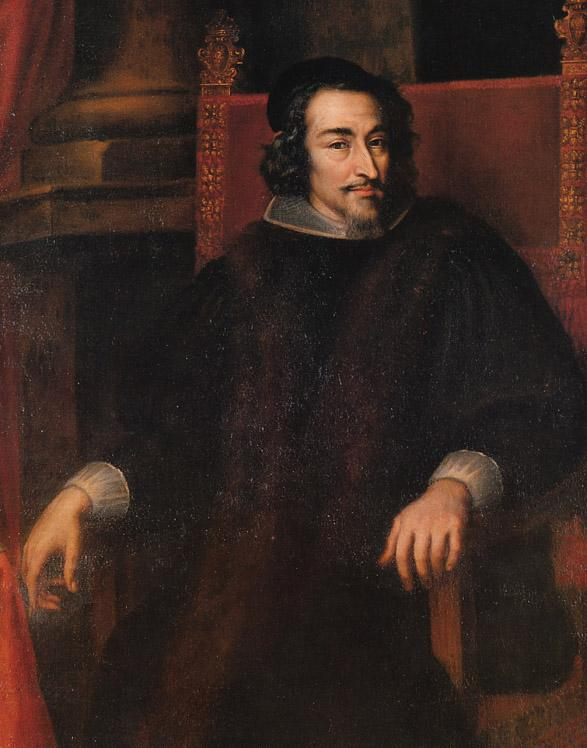
- Bartolomeo Arese

President of the Senate of Milan
- In office 16 November 1660 – 24 June 1675
- Preceded by: Luigi Cusani
- Succeeded by: Carlo Belloni

Personal details
- Born: 23 October 1590 Milan, Duchy of Milan
- Died: 23 September 1674 (aged 83) Milan, Duchy of Milan
- Resting place: San Nazaro in Brolo
- Spouse: Lucrezia Omodei
- Children: 3
- Parent: Giulio I Arese (father)
- Education: University of Pavia
- Occupation: Politician; Jurist

Bartolomeo III Arese count of Castel Lambro born in Milan on 23 October 1590 and died in the same city on 23 September 1674 was an Italian nobleman, politician, and prominent member of the House of Arese.

== Biography ==
Bartolomeo Arese son of nobleman Giulio I Arese was born in Milan on October 23, 1590. His father belonged to a rich Milanese family of “robe nobility” (nobiltà di toga) which, especially between the sixteenth and seventeenth centuries, was the center of bureaucracy in the Milanese domains. His paternal grandmother, Hippolita Clari, was the daughter of Giulio (1525-1575), a famous jurist from Alexandria, whose work heavily influenced criminal procedure in civil law countries until the reforms of Cesare Beccaria. He married Lucrezia Omodei, granddaughter of the banker Emilio Omodei.

While governing the Milanese domains, Bartolomeo III was the city's principle patron of baroque architecture, art, and music, commissioning Palazzo Arese (later Arese Litta) in Milan by Francesco Maria Richini, extensive additions to Palazzo Arese (later Arese Borromeo) in Cesano Maderno, renovations of San Nicolao, Milan and Santa Maria alla Porta, Milan by Francesco Borromini, the Arese Chapel (Chapel of the Assumption) in San Vittore al Corpo, Milan by Antonio Busca, painting cycles by Giuseppe Nuvolone, Ercole Procaccini the Younger, Luigi Pellegrini Scaramuccia, and Giovanni Stefano Danedi in the Ducal Palace of Milan (now Royal Palace of Milan), and concertos by Francesco Rognoni Taeggio, Giovanni Battista Beria, Teodoro Casati, Federico Pedroni, and Carlo Giuseppe Sanromano.

== Bibliography ==
- Gualdo Priorato, Galeazzo (1666). Relazione della città e stato di Milano sotto il governo dell'ecc.mo sig. Don Luigi of Guzman Ponze di Leone (in Italian). Milan: Lodovico Monza.
- Leti, Gregorio (1854) [1st pub. 1678]. Il governo del duca d'Ossuna e la vita di Bartolomeo Arese (in Italian). Milan: Franc. Colombo.
