= Senate of Milan =

Governing body of the Duchy of Milan, 1499–1786

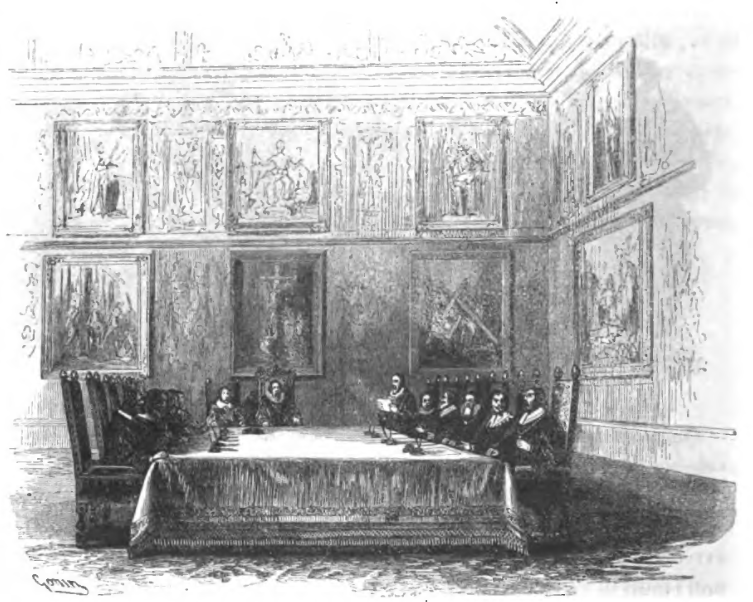
A session of the Senate of Milan in an engraving by Francesco Gonin

The Senate of Milan (Italian: Senato di Milano), formally the Most Excellent Senate of Milan (Latin: Senatus Excellentissimus Mediolani), was one of the most important governing bodies of the Duchy of Milan, vested with jurisdictional and legislative functions. It was an institution that embodied and upheld the values and legal systems of the ancien régime. The Senate's decisions and legal precedents significantly influenced the development of substantive law in Lombardy.

== Historical background ==
Prior to the accession of Francesco Sforza to the throne of Milan (1450), the General Council (Consiglio Generale) had been the most powerful body in the city, alongside the Visconti family. It had replaced the Medieval Senate, presided over by the Bishop and composed of representatives of the various neighbourhoods of the city. Summoned by the Podestà, the General Council was vested with both political and judicial functions. When Francesco Sforza entered the city following a long war with the Golden Ambrosian Republic, the council’s powers were limited, only ever being convened to approve taxes.

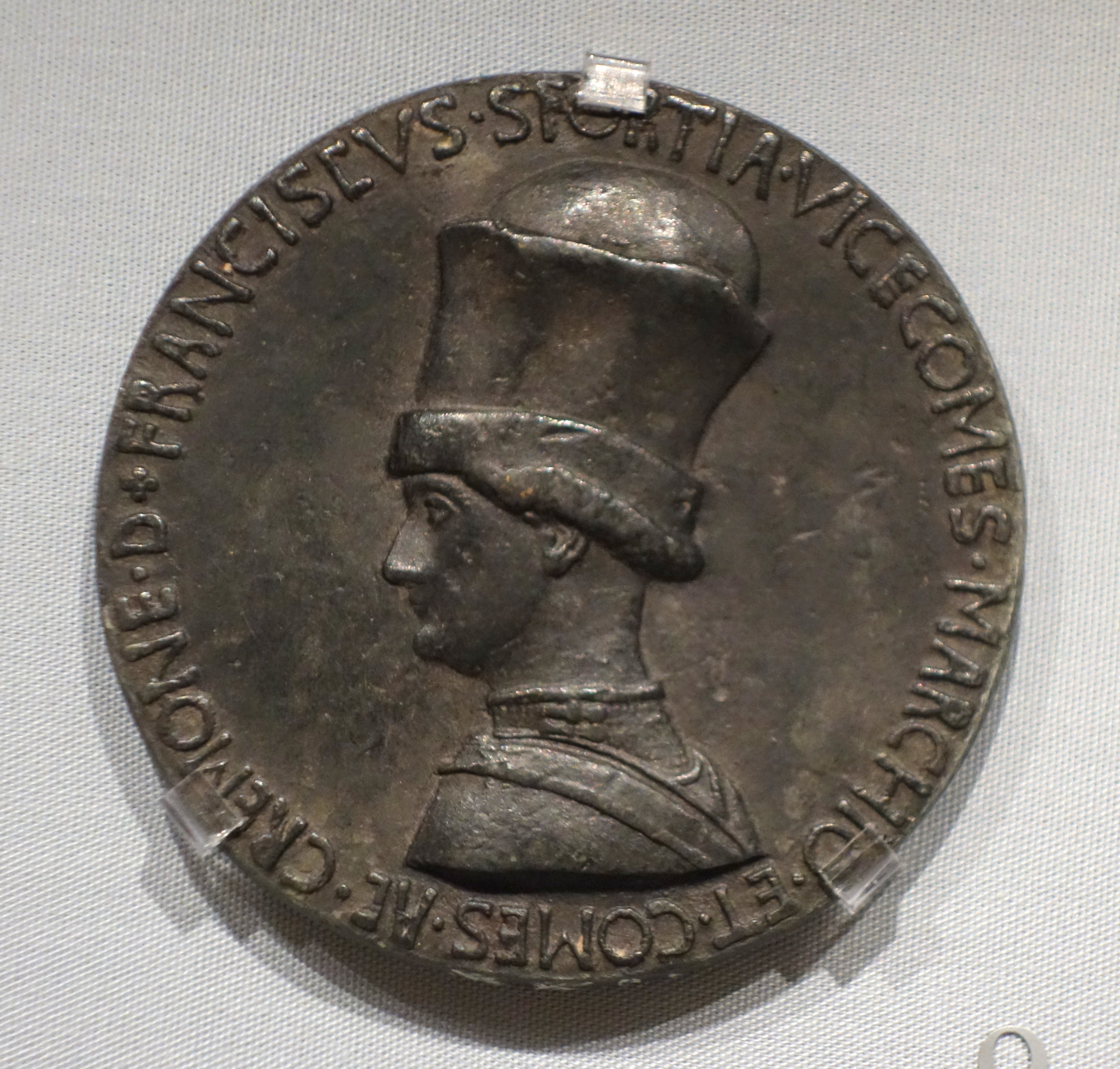
Medal of Francesco Sforza by Pisanello

Francesco Sforza was supported in the actual governing of the city by an advisory council consisting of twelve individuals (formally called Tribunale di Provvisione). The Tribunale di Provvisione was assisted by three judges, tasked with overseeing specific aspects of public good. Francesco Sforza established also two other councils: the Privy Council (Consilium secretum), the supreme court of the Duchy of Milan, vested with important powers and even supposed to replace the Duke in his absence, and the Council of Justice (Consilium iustitiae), vested with technical attributions. The members of both councils were appointed by the Duke and usually came from high-ranking families of the dominion. Galeazzo Maria Sforza expanded the powers of the Privy Council and doubled its membership from Duke Francesco's time.

== History ==
The Senate of Milan was established by Louis XII of France with the ordonnance of Vigevano of 11 November 1499. Modeled after the French parlements, it replaced the Privy Council and the Council of Justice. The Spanish, who took control of the Duchy in 1535, significantly expanded the powers of the Senate. The president and several prominent members of the Senate of Milan participated in the drafting of the new constitutions of the Duchy (1541) established by the Spanish emperor Charles V.

== Structure ==
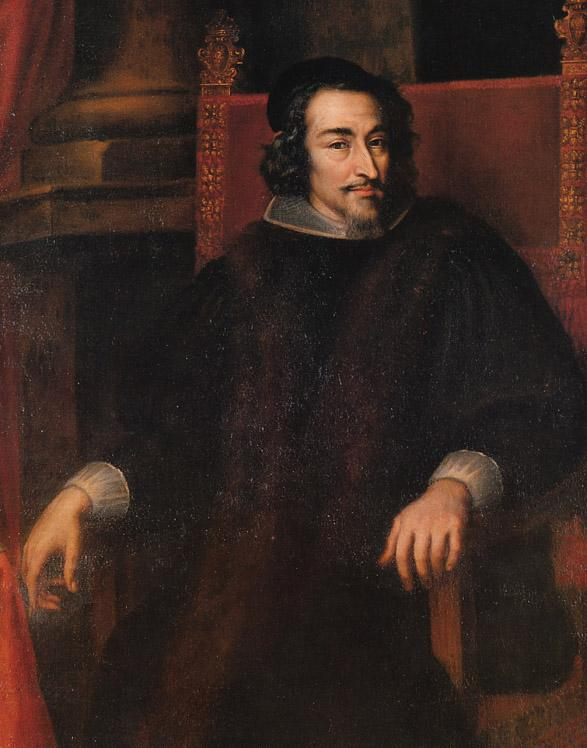
Bartolomeo III Arese, president of the Senate of Milan 1660-75

The members of the Senate—called senators (senatores)—were appointed for life. At the time of its creation, the Senate was composed of 17 members: 12 Milanese citizens, plus five Frenchmen trusted by Louis XII. According to the provisions of the King of France, at least two senators had to be prelates and four military officers. The remainder had to be legal scholars. The first seventeen senators appointed by Louis XII were Antonio Trivulzio, Bishop of Como, Gerolamo Pallavicini, Bishop of Novara, Pietro Gallarate, Francesco Bernardino Visconti, Gilberto Borromeo, Erasmo Trivulzio, Scipione Barbavara, Giovan Francesco Marliani, Giovan Francesco da Corte, Giovanni Stefano Castiglioni, Gerolamo Cusani, Antonio Caccia, Claude de Seyssel (counselor of the Parlement of Toulouse), Accurse Maynier, Michel Riccio, Gioffredo Carolo (counselor of the Parlement of Dauphiné), and Pierre de Sacierges.

Over time, the number of senators increased, reaching 27 by 1535, including nine knights, five prelates, and 13 jurists. In the 17th century, the number was reduced to 15, three of whom were Spanish. Jurists, drawn from the Milanese nobility, ultimately prevailed within the college thanks to their cultural background; membership in the Senate, and particularly its presidency, represented the pinnacle of a jurist's career. Among the most famous members of the Senate of Milan was Giulio Claro, one of Italy's most distinguished Renaissance jurists.

== Functions ==
The Senate of Milan was the keeper of Milan and Lombardy’s juridical tradition. It can be considered the continuity factor in the Duchy that transcended the changes in dynasty. Its most important power was the right to ratify laws, that is, the power to confirm the provisions of the sovereign (or the Governor representing him) or to oppose them if they conflicted with the laws of the Duchy of Milan. In this way the Senate granted some form of self-government to the Duchy even under foreign rule.

The Senate was also the supreme court of the Duchy of Milan for civil and criminal matters: it was the sole court for the most important civil cases (concerning land boundaries, family law and inheritance rights, the appointment of legal guardians, obligations between private individuals, and feudal law) and for crimes punishable by death; it was the second instance court for decisions of higher courts and the last instance court for decisions of lower courts. It could take over cases under the jurisdiction of other courts or send orders (rescripta) to them with instructions on how to decide single cases.

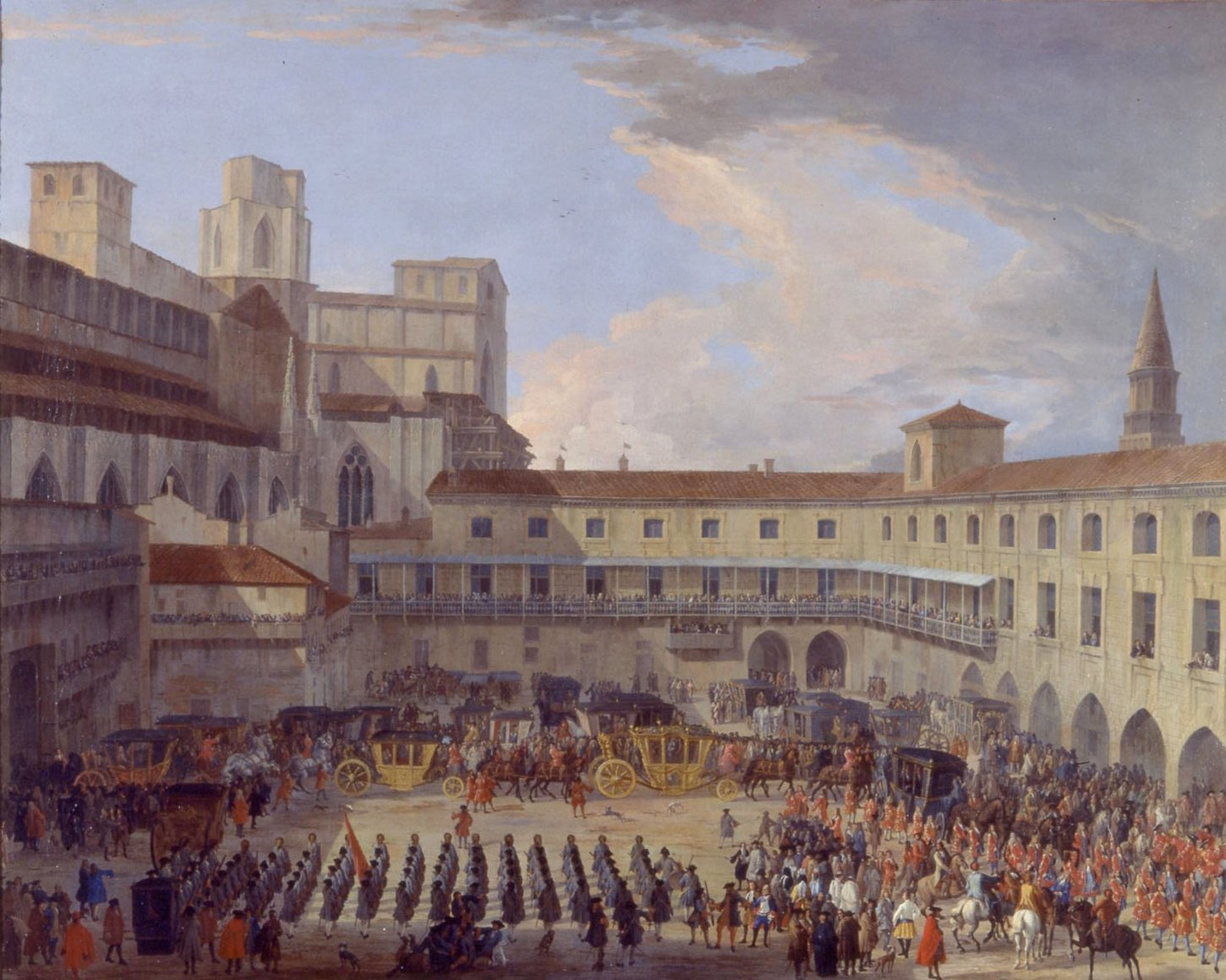
The Palazzo Regio-Ducale of Milan in an early 18th century painting by Luca Carlevarijs

Although the Senate was a collegial body, only the most sensitive or controversial cases were handled by the full college, which held its sessions in a hall (called Sala dell'Udienza) located on the piano nobile of the Palazzo Regio-Ducale (now the Royal Palace of Milan).

The Senate's rulings (decisiones) were final and irrevocable; they constituted binding precedents for lower courts, who were required to respect them. For this reason, the Senate's rulings were collected and published. The Senate could disapply a law or deviate from its consolidated practice. It did not give any reason for its rulings, and its activity was surrounded by secrecy.

Among the Senate’s tasks was the direction of the University of Pavia (where jurists were trained), the censorship of books and the protection of public health, through the Magistracy of Health, whose president was appointed by the Senate among its members.

== Abolition ==
Due to the secrecy of its rulings and their perceived irrationality, the Senate came to be considered a symbol of the arbitrariness of the ancien régime. The Senate stubbornly opposed the reforms of Maria Theresa, rejecting the reformers' attempts to rule through cooperation. Already stripped of its administrative powers in 1771, it was definitively abolished by Joseph II with an edict of 11 February 1786, as part of the reforms that profoundly modernised the legal system of the Duchy of Milan.

== Bibliography ==
- "Senato di Milano (1771 - 1786)". Ministero della cultura.
- Crespi, Attilio Luigi (1898). Del Senato di Milano: ricerche intorno alla costituzione della Stato di Milano al tempo della dominazione spagnuola. Milan: Riformatorio Patronato.
- Petronio, Ugo (1968). "Sull'origine del Senato di Milano". Rassegna degli Archivi di Stato. 28: 332–48.
- Monti, Annamaria (2003). Iudicare tamquam Deus. I modi della giustizia senatoria nel Ducato di Milano tra Cinque e Settecento. Milan: Giuffrè. ISBN 978-8814107542.
- Meschini, Stefano (2004). Luigi XII duca di Milano: gli uomini e le istituzioni del primo dominio francese, 1499-1512. Milan: Franco Angeli. ISBN 978-8846453006.
- Monti, Annamaria (2021). "Under the Legal Authority of the Senate of Milan (Sixteenth to Seventeenth Centuries)" (PDF). In Guido Rossi (ed.). Authorities in Early Modern Law Courts. Edinburgh: Edinburgh University Press. pp. 137–149. ISBN 978-1474451017.
