= Francesco Teodoro Arese Lucini =

Italian Milanese resistance fighter

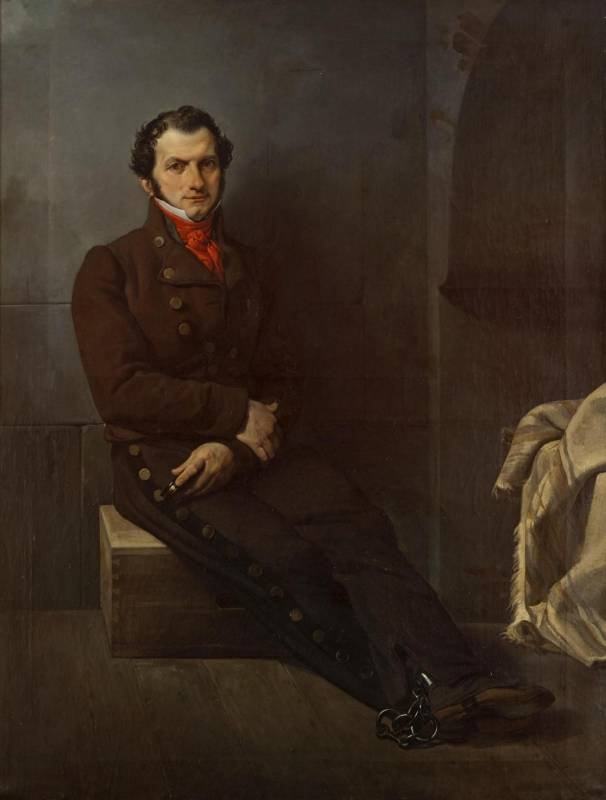
Francesco Hayez, Portrait of Count Arese in Prison (1828)

Francesco Teodoro Arese Lucini (Milan, 30 January 1778 – Milan, 30 April 1835) was a prominent member of the Milanese resistance to the Austrian Empire, early proponent of Italian unification, and member of the House of Arese.

He was held in the Špilberk Castle and sentenced to death (later commuted) by Francis I, Emperor of Austria for his former alliance with Eugène de Beauharnais, Viceroy of the Napoleonic Kingdom of Italy, and for conspiring to liberate Lombardy and unite it with Piedmont.

== Gallery ==
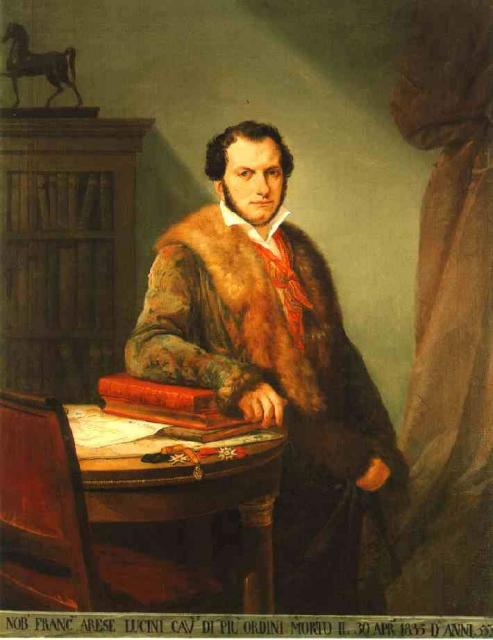
Giuseppe Sogni, Portrait of Count Arese, 1855

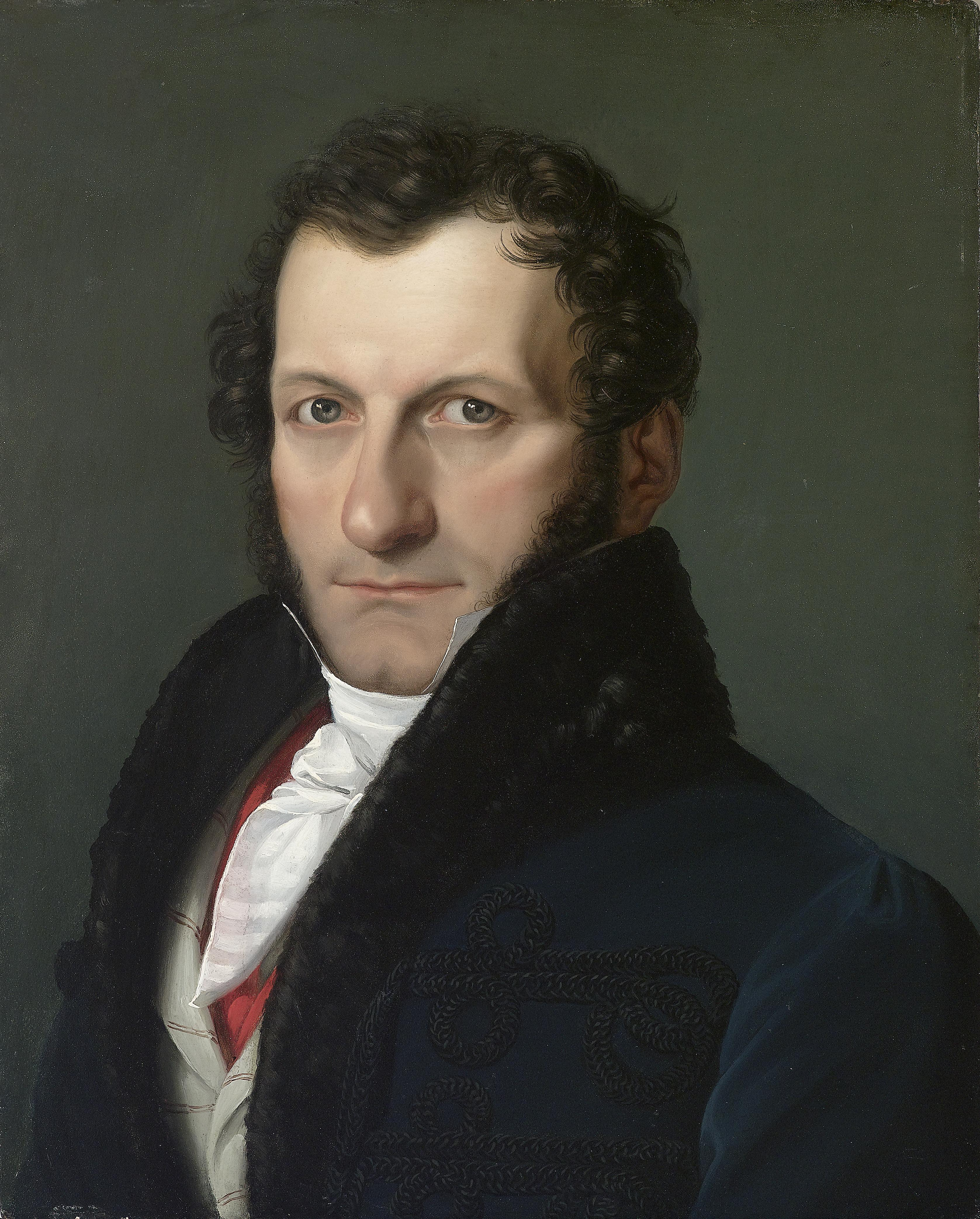
Pelagio Palagi, Portrait of Colonel Teodoro Arese Lucini
