= Cesano Maderno =

- Comune
- Città di Cesano Maderno
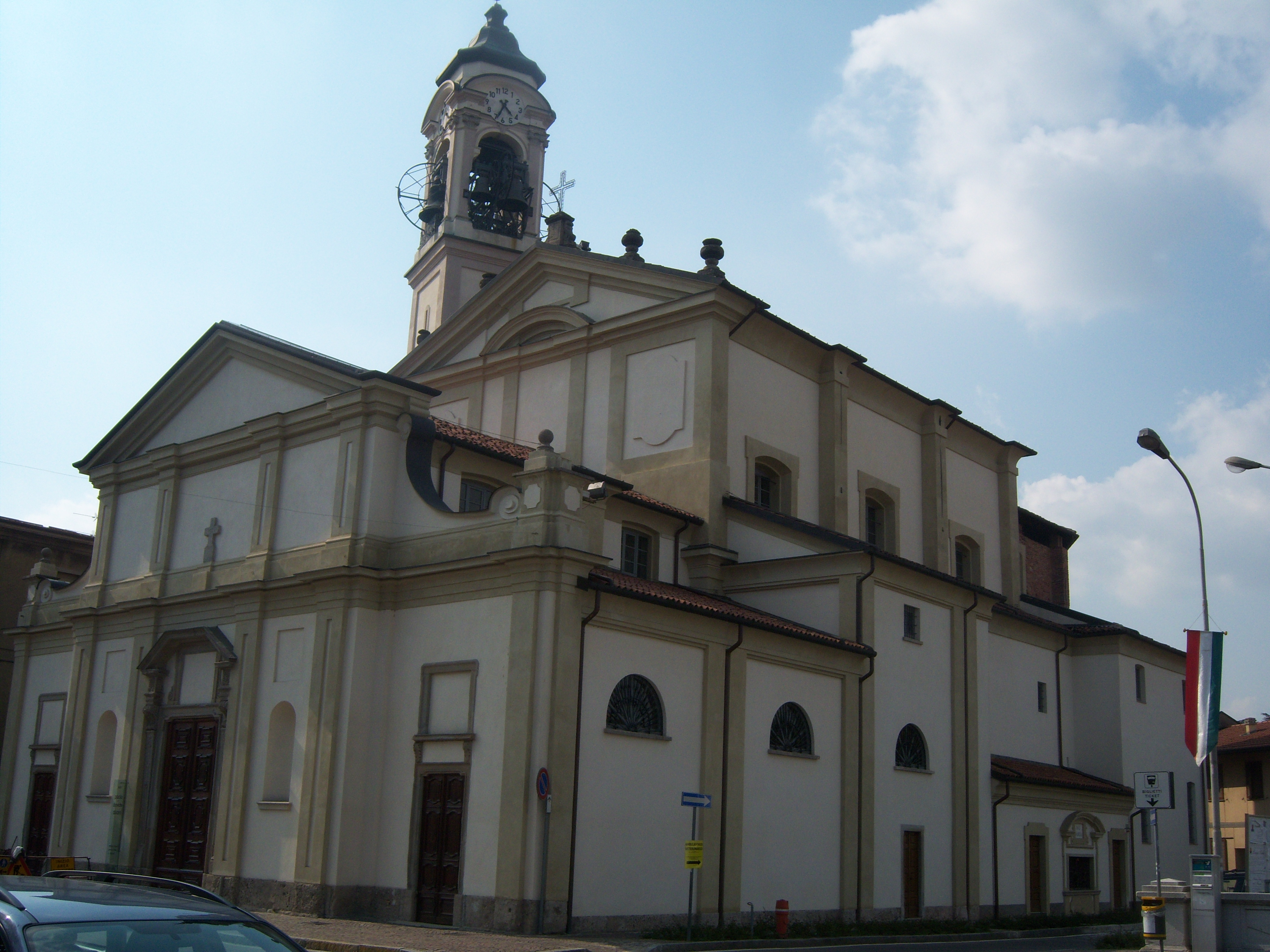
- Church in Cesano Maderno

- Coat of arms

- Location within Italy Location within Lombardy
- Coordinates: 45°37′41″N 09°08′46″E
- Country: Italy
- Region: Lombardy
- Province: Monza and Brianza (MB)
- Frazioni: Binzago, Cascina Gaeta, Cassina Savina, S.Pio X, Sacra Famiglia, Villaggio Snia

Government
  - Mayor: giampiero bocca

Area
  - Total: 11 km^{2} (4.2 sq mi)
- Elevation: 201 m (659 ft)

Population (01 September 2025)
  - Total: 39.960
  - Density: 3.6/km^{2} (9.4/sq mi)
- Demonym: Cesanesi
- Time zone: UTC+1 (CET)
  - Summer (DST): UTC+2 (CEST)
- Postal code: 20811
- Dialing code: 0362
- Patron saint: St. Stephen Martyr
- Saint day: Fourth Sunday in September
- Website: Official website

Cesano Maderno (Milanese: Cesaa) is a town and comune of about 39,960 inhabitants in the province of Monza and Brianza, Lombardy, northern Italy. The town borders with the towns of Seveso in the north, in the south with Bovisio-Masciago, in the east with Desio and Seregno, and in the west with Ceriano Laghetto and Cogliate. It received the honorary title of city with a presidential decree on 11 October 1999.

It is served by Cesano Maderno railway station and Cesano Maderno-Groane railway station.

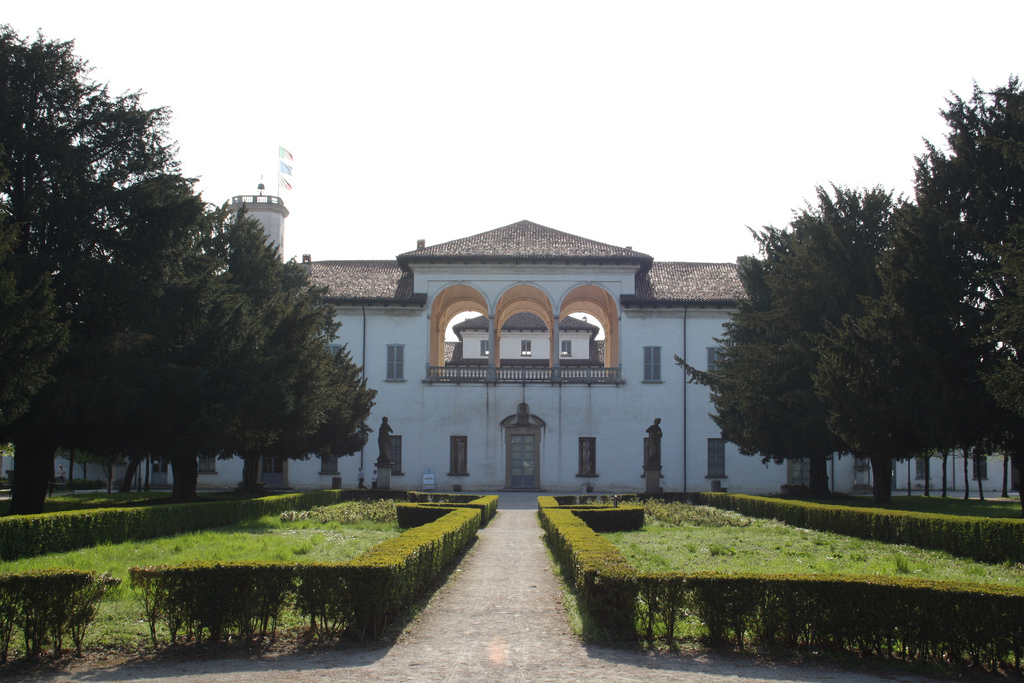
Borromeo Palace

== Main sights ==
- Palazzo Arese Borromeo
- Palazzo Arese Jacini
- Il Torrazzo
- Palazzina Carcano Cabiate
- Ancient church of Santo Stefano

== Sports ==
Cesano Maderno has several football clubs: AC Cesano Maderno, DB Calcio Cesano Maderno and A.S.D. Molinello, all of which play in Seconda Categoria. DB Calcio Cesano Maderno is also affiliated with AC Monza

== Twin towns ==
- Valençay, France
- Chernivtsi, Ukraine
- Campomaggiore, Italy
