= Barlassina =

- Comune
- Comune di Barlassina
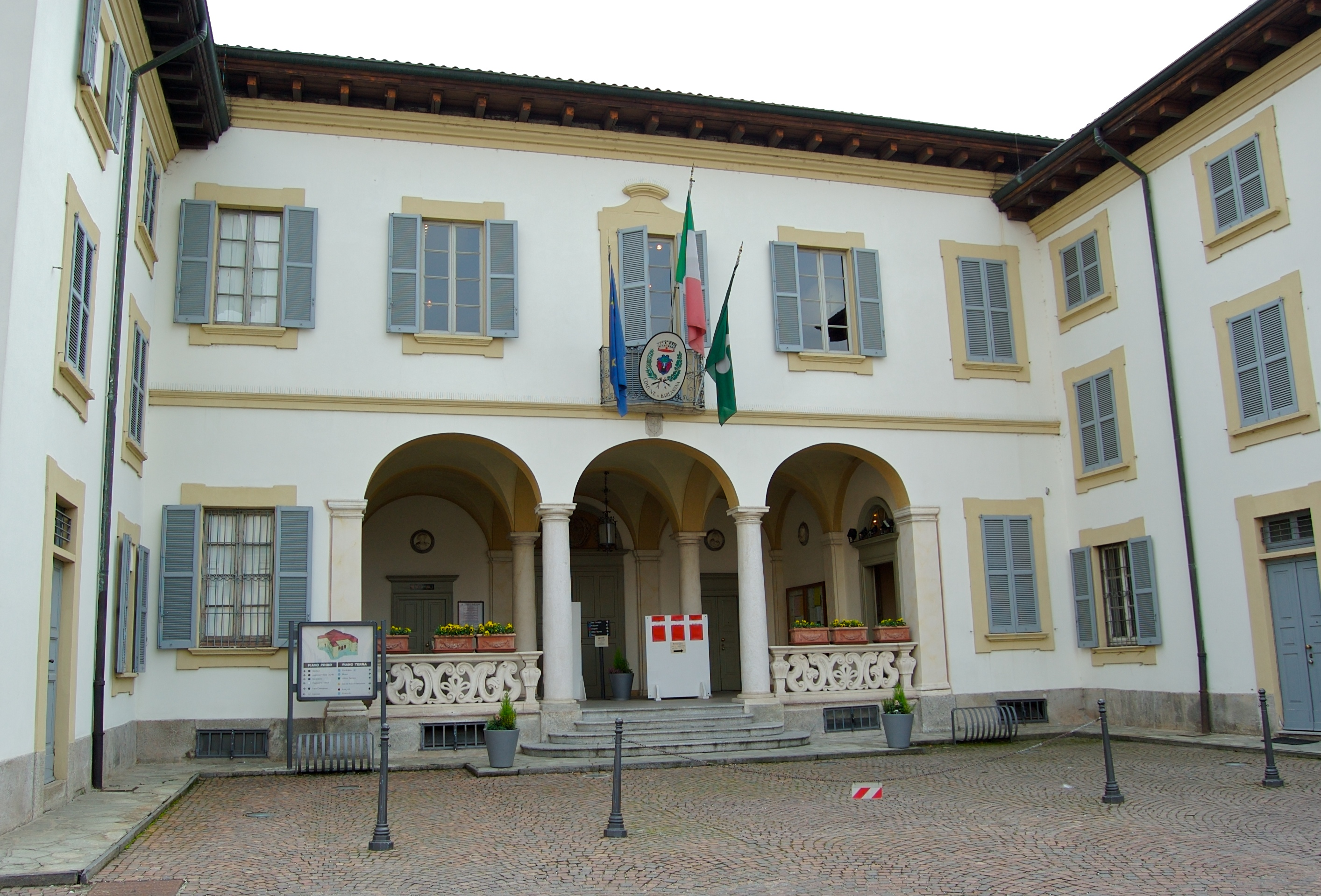
- Palazzo Rezzonico, the Town Hall.

- Coat of arms

- Location within Italy Location within Lombardy
- Coordinates: 45°39′N 9°8′E
- Country: Italy
- Region: Lombardy
- Province: Monza and Brianza (MB)

Government
  - Mayor: Giovanni Paolo Vintani

Area
  - Total: 2.76 km^{2} (1.07 sq mi)
- Highest elevation: 300 m (980 ft)
- Lowest elevation: 227 m (745 ft)

Population (1 January 2024)
  - Total: 6,907
  - Density: 2,500/km^{2} (6,480/sq mi)
- Demonym: Barlassinesi
- Time zone: UTC+1 (CET)
  - Summer (DST): UTC+2 (CEST)
- Postal code: 20825
- Dialing code: 0362
- ISTAT code: 108005
- Website: Official website

Barlassina is a comune (municipality) in the Province of Monza and Brianza in the Italian region Lombardy, located about 28 kilometres (17 mi) north of Milan and 17 kilometres (11 mi) south of Como. The town extends over two areas, the one to the east sloping down towards the Seveso valley and the one to the west higher than the rest of the town because it is located on the Groane plateau, surrounded on three sides by the Groane Park. The bordering municipalities are: Lentate sul Seveso to the north, Meda to the east, Seveso to the south/east, Cogliate to the west.
