= Italian Baroque architecture =

Style of architecture

Italian Baroque architecture refers to Baroque architecture in Italy.

== Introduction ==
The Baroque architecture period began in Italy during the late 16th century. It originated during the Counter-Reformation, which was mainly led by the Catholic Church to appeal to people through new art and a new style of architecture. Baroque architecture is characterised by drama and grandeur. It is very ornate, with intricate decoration and detailing throughout. Expensive materials were used during this period, for example marble, granite, gold, and silk. Many churches, however, only wanted to give the appearance of those materials, so they would paint wood to mimic them. Some of the dramatic design elements of this period included large domes, cupolas, and double-hipped roofs. Baroque Architecture continued to be popular until the 18th century.

== Central and Southern Italy ==
=== Rome ===
The Baroque architecture period began with the creation of the basilica with a crossed dome and nave. One of the first Roman structures to move away from the Mannerist conventions, like the Church of the Gesù, was the church of Church of Saint Susanna, designed by Carlo Maderno in 1596. The dynamic use of columns and pilasters, and central decoration make it more complex. Baroque buildings often include domes and show a playful yet disciplined approach to classic design rules.

Pietro da Cortona's work, like Santi Luca e Martina (1635) and Santa Maria della Pace (1656), emphasizes movement, continuity, and dramatic effects. Santa Maria della Pace, with its curved wings, resembling a theatre stage, fills a small piazza. Other Roman designs of the time also use theatrical elements to dominate and enhance the surrounding cityscape.

Saint Peter's Square designed by Gian Lorenzo Bernini, known for its grand scale and awe-inspiring design, is a famous example of Baroque architecture. Bernini's favorite work was the oval shaped Sant'Andrea al Quirinale (1658), featuring a lofty altar and soaring dome that showcase the Baroque style. His vision for Baroque townhouses is exemplified by the Palazzo Barberini (1629) and Palazzo Chigi-Odescalchi [it] (1664), both in Rome.

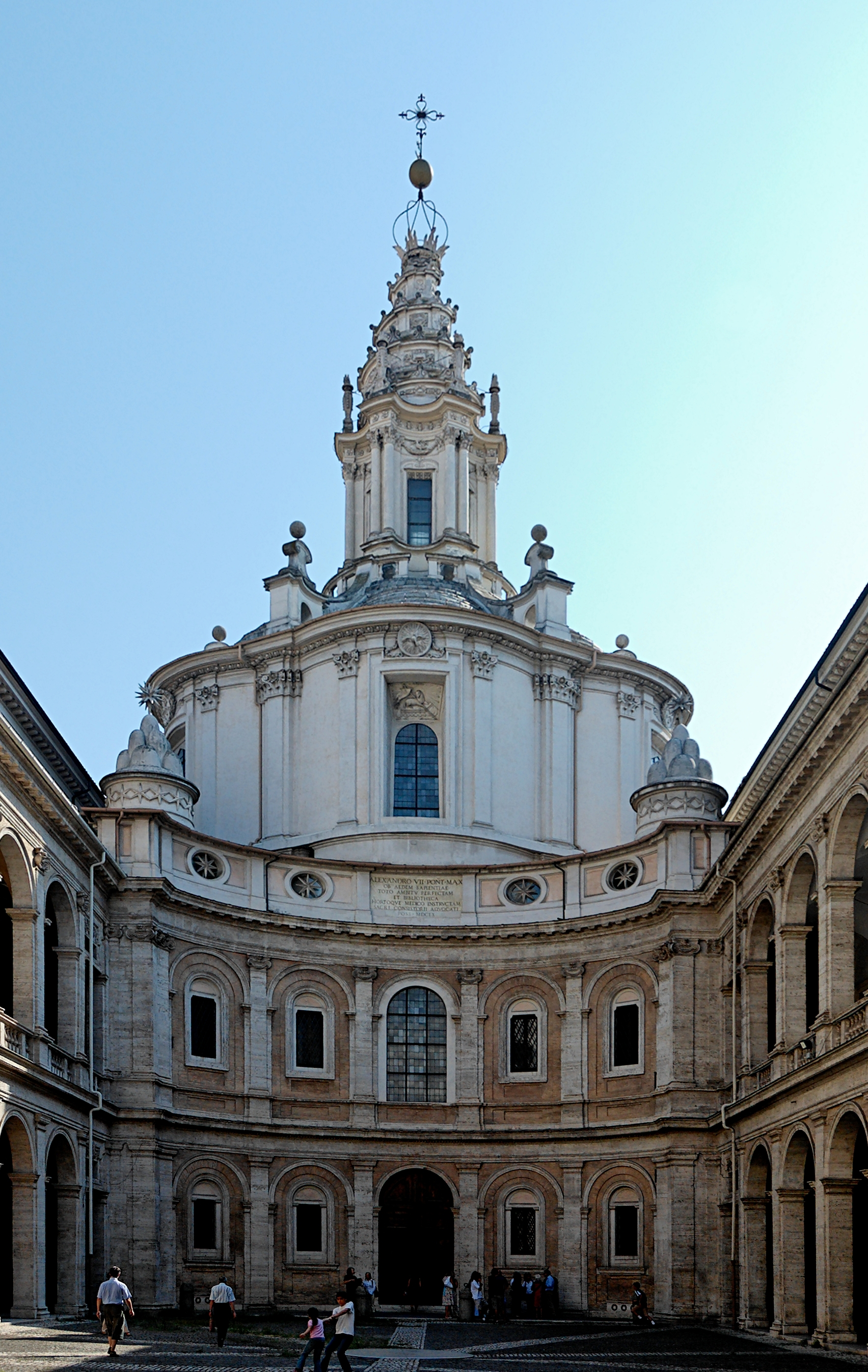
Sant'Ivo alla Sapienza: Francesco Borromini

Bernini's main rival in Rome was Francesco Borromini, known for breaking away from classical styles. Seen as revolutionary, Borromini rejected the human-centered designs of the 16th century, opting instead for complex geometric shapes. His spaces seemed to shift and flow, resembling Michelangelo's later style. Borromini's masterpiece, San Carlo alle Quattro Fontane, is famous for its wavy oval shape and intricate curves. Another notable work, Sant'Ivo alla Sapienza, features creative designs and a corkscrew-shaped dome, avoiding flat surfaces.

After Bernini's death in 1680, Carlo Fontana became Rome's leading architect. His early work, like the concave façade of San Marcello al Corso, reflects his academic style. While less innovative than earlier Roman architects, Fontana's writings and teachings greatly influenced Baroque architecture, spreading its style across 18th-century Europe.

In the 18th century, Europe's architectural focus shifted from Rome to Paris. Italian Rococo, inspired by Borromini's ideas, thrived in Rome from the 1720s. Talented architects like Francesco de Sanctis (Spanish Steps, 1723) and Filippo Raguzzini (Piazza Sant'Ignazio [it], 1727) had limited influence outside of Italy, as did Sicilian Baroque architects such as Giovanni Battista Vaccarini, Andrea Palma, and Giuseppe Venanzio Marvuglia.

=== Naples ===
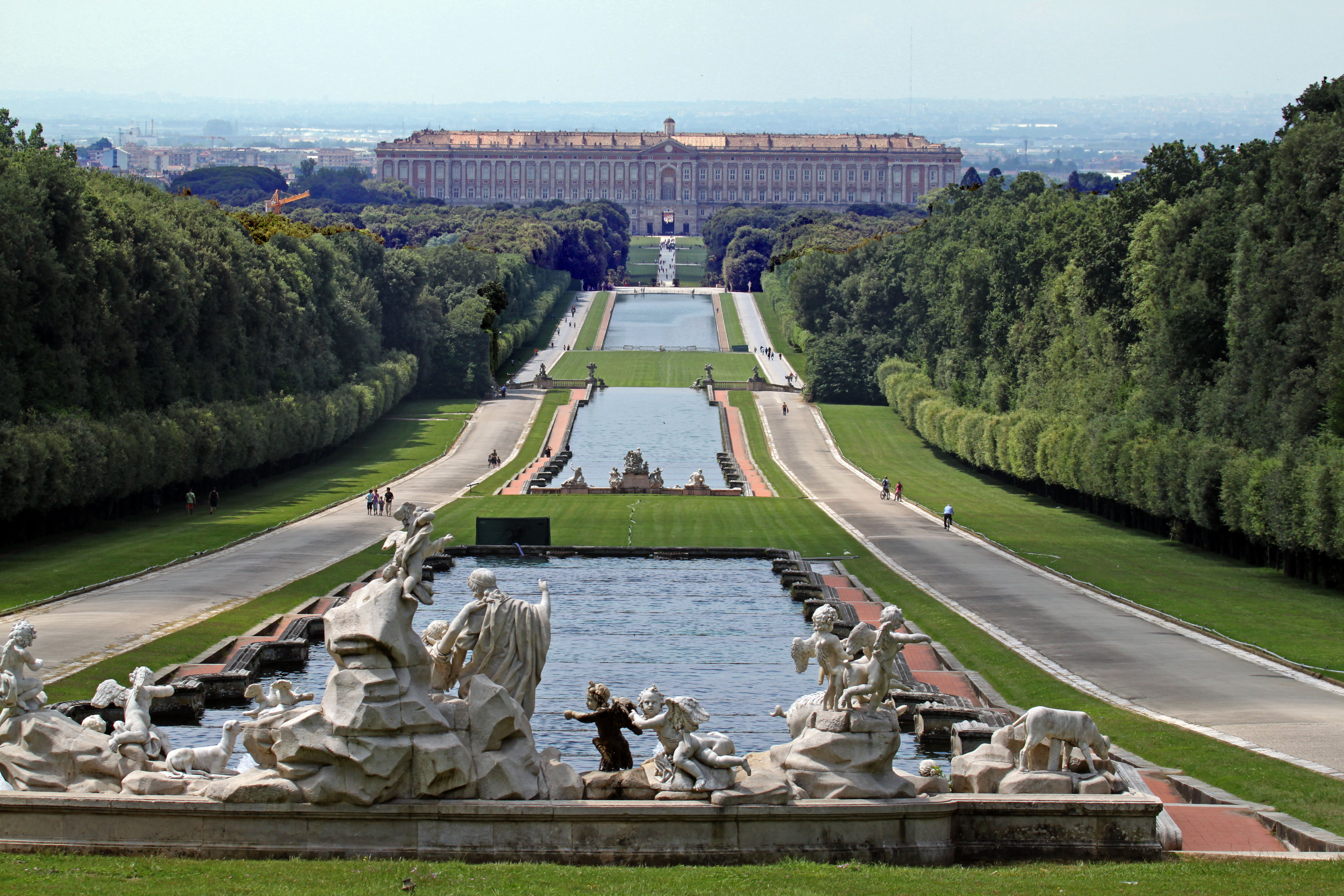
The Baroque Palace of Caserta in Caserta, near Naples.

The final phase of Baroque architecture in Italy is showcased by Luigi Vanvitelli's Caserta Palace, one of the largest buildings in 18th-century Europe. Influenced by French and Spanish styles, the palace blends harmoniously with its surroundings. In Naples and Caserta, Vanvitelli's classical style balanced aesthetics and engineering, paving the way to Neoclassicism.

=== Sicily ===
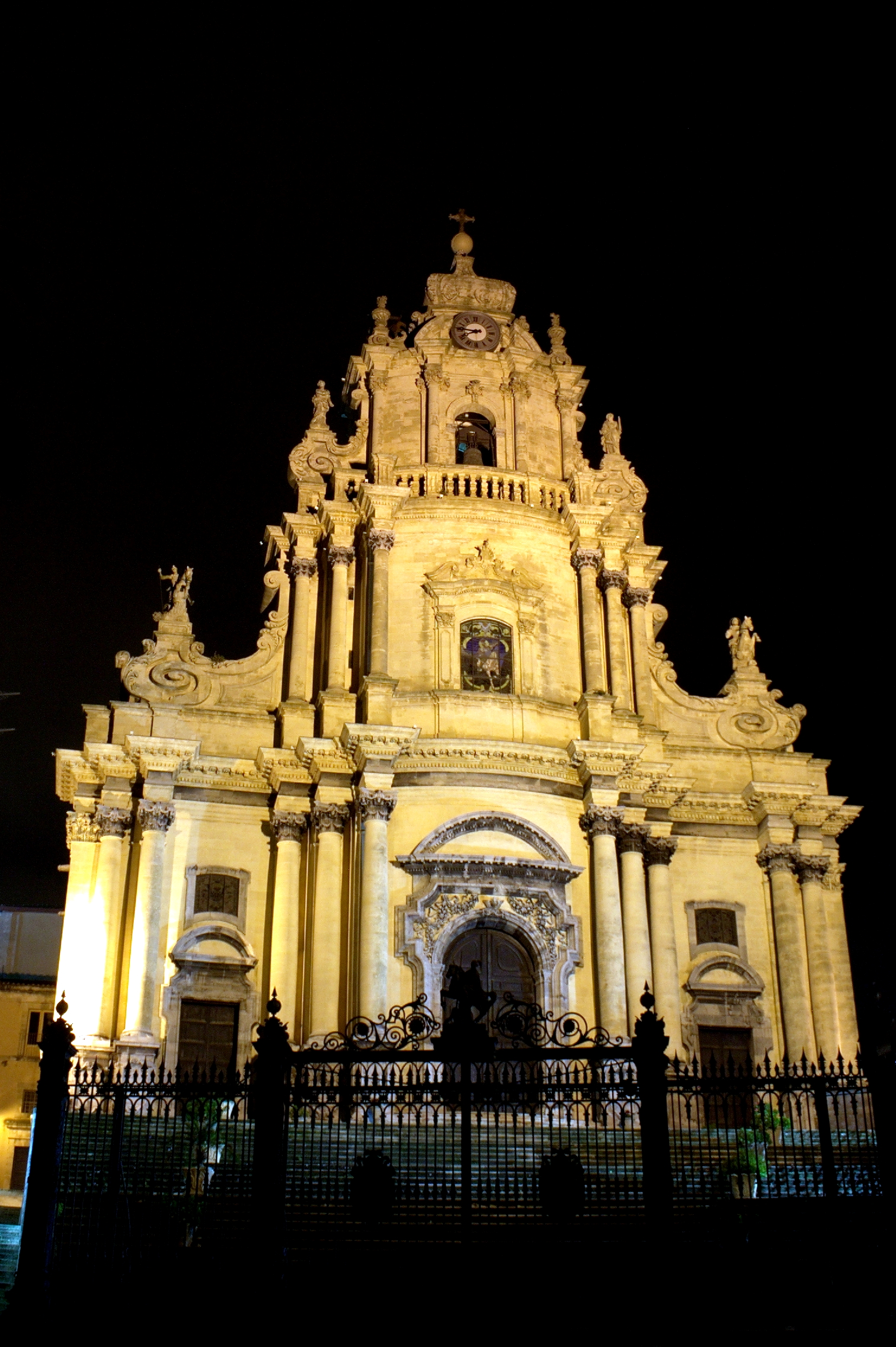
The Baroque Duomo of San Giorgio in Ragusa, Italy, on the island of Sicily.

Sicilian Baroque is a unique style of Baroque architecture that developed in Sicily, during the 17th and 18th centuries. It is known for its curves, decorative flourishes, grinning masks, and putti, or cherubs, creating a flamboyant look that defines Sicily's architectural identity.

Sicilian Baroque flourished after a major rebuilding effort following a massive earthquake in 1693. Before this, Baroque on the island was simpler and influenced by local styles rather than Rome's architects. After the earthquake, local architects (many of them trained in Rome), introduced more refined Baroque designs, inspiring others. By 1730, Sicilian architects had developed their own confident, unique version of the style. However, from the 1780s, it was gradually replaced by the rising popularity of Neoclassicism.

The decorative Sicilian Baroque period lasted about 50 years, reflecting the island's social order, under Spain's nominal rule but governed by a wealthy aristocracy. This style shaped Sicily's architectural identity, which continues to influence designs into the 21st century.

== Northern Italy ==
=== Turin ===
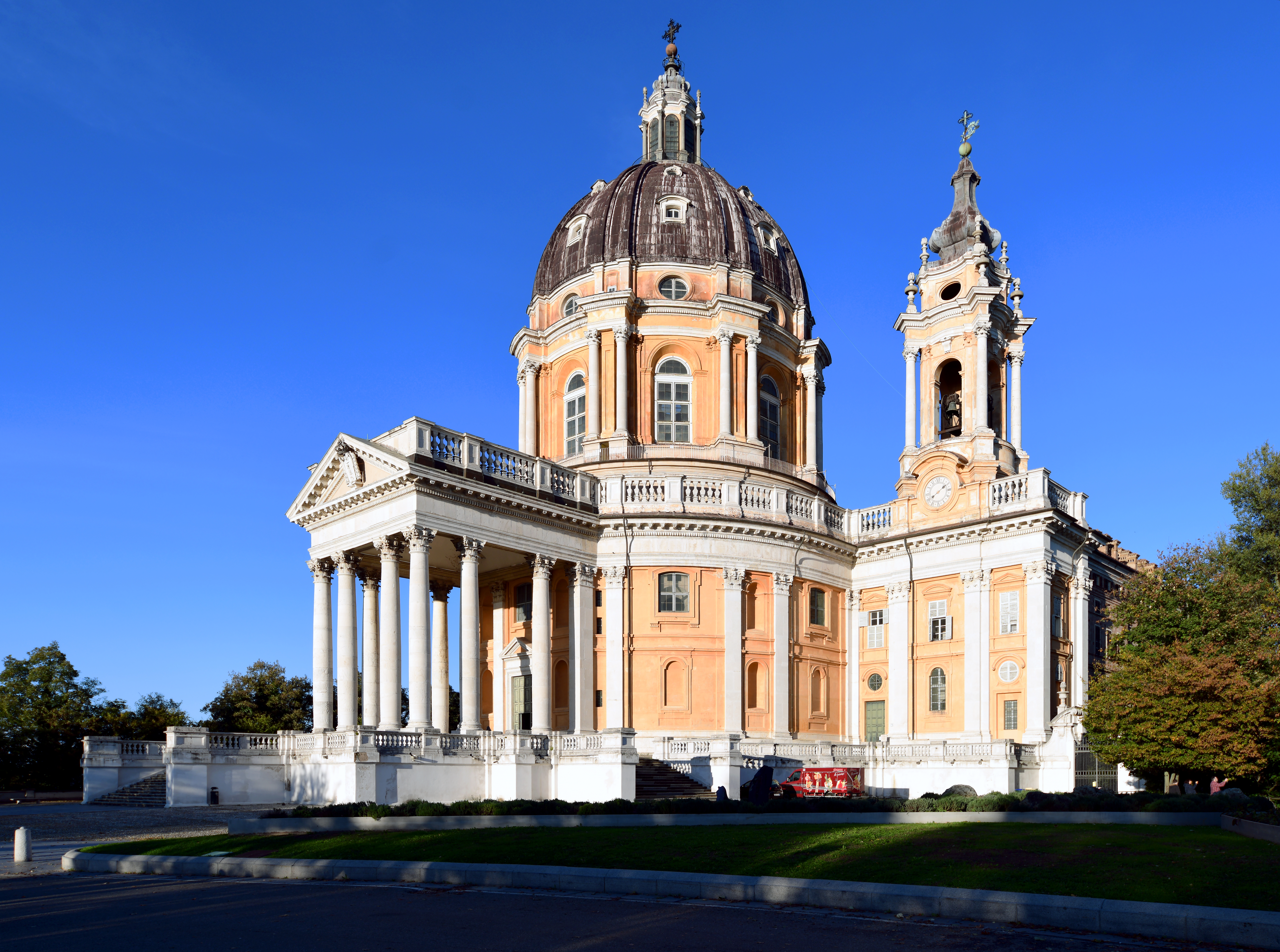
Basilica of Superga near Turin: Filippo Juvarra

In the north of Italy, particularly Turin, the House of Savoy embraced the new style, showcasing their royal status through the works of architects Guarino Guarini, Filippo Juvarra and Bernardo Vittone.

Guarini, a traveling monk, blended various traditions, including that of Gothic architecture, to create unique structures with oval columns and unconventional façades. Using contemporary geometry and stereotomy, he developed architectura obliqua, a bold style similar to Borromini's. His Palazzo Carignano (1679) is a striking example of Baroque design applied to a private residence.

Juverra's fluid forms, delicate details, and light-filled designs foreshadowed the Rococo style. While he worked beyond Turin, his most notable creations were for Victor Amadeus II of Sardinia. The Basilica of Superga (1717) stands out with its striking roofline and hilltop location above Turin. At the royal hunting lodge, Palazzina di Stupinigi (1729), he embraced a more flexible architectural style. Juvarra's brief but impactful career ended in Madrid, where he contributed to the royal palaces at La Granja and Aranjuez.

Bernardo Vittone, deeply inspired by Juvarra and Guarini, was a leading Piedmontese architect known for his ornate Rococo churches. His designs often included quatrefoil layouts, intricate details, layered vaults, and domes within domes.

=== Milan ===
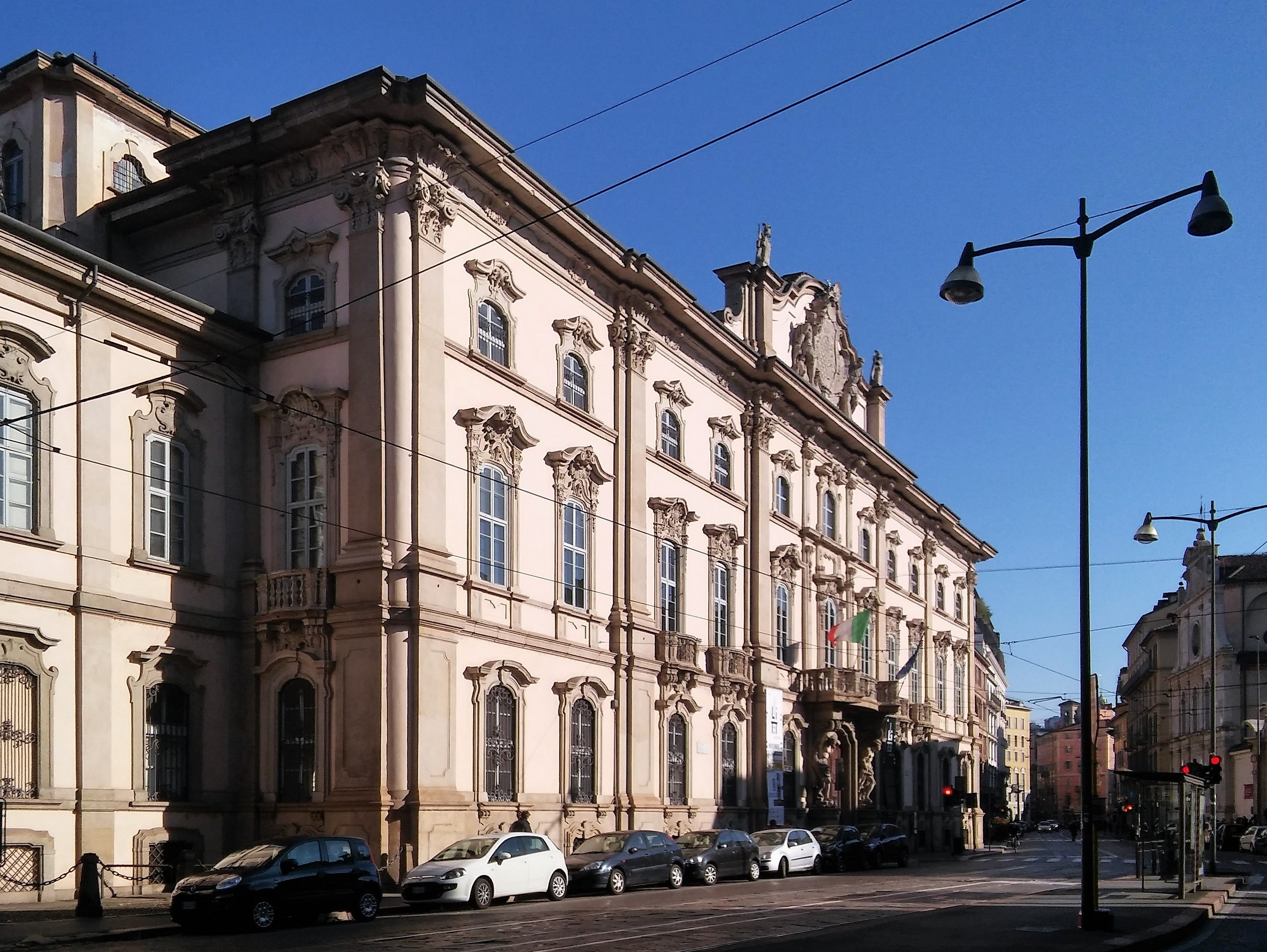
The Baroque Palazzo Litta in Milan.

Between 1607 and 1630 Francesco Maria Richini (1584–1658) built the Church of San Giuseppe, breaking away from the restrained Mannerist style. Inspired by the Church of the Gesù in Rome, Richini used a combined plan with two central areas influenced by Milan's Church of Sant'Alessandro in Zebedia. The facade stands out with its dramatic design and layered niches.

In 1627, Richini designed the façade of the Collegio Elvetico (now the seat of Archivio di Stato), using a curved design to connect the interior and exterior. This innovative approach, possibly the first curved Baroque façade, anticipated themes later seen in Borromini's work, cementing Richini's status as a leading early Baroque architect.

=== Venice ===
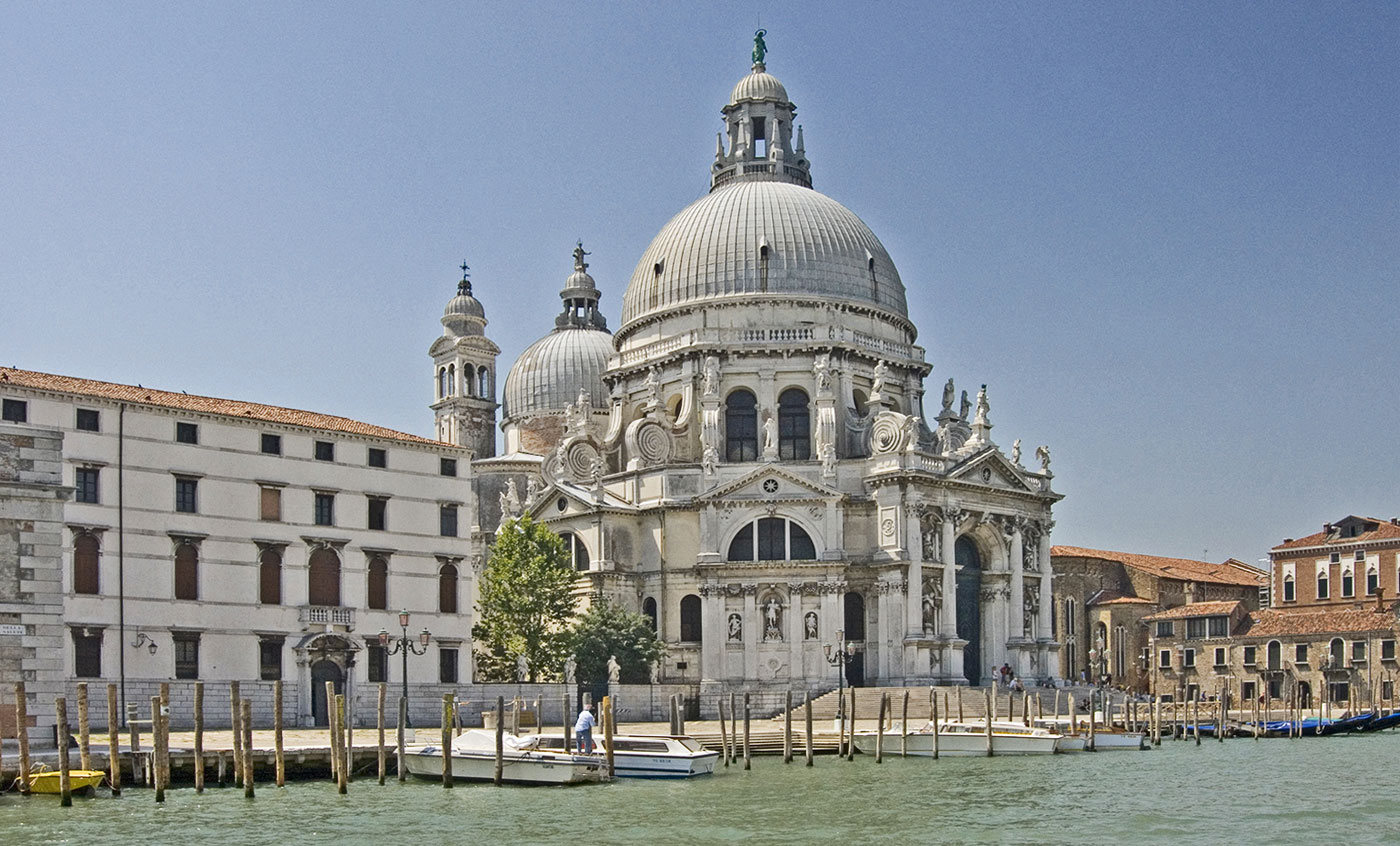
Basilica di Santa Maria della Salute, Venice

In Venice, a key figure of Baroque architecture was Baldassarre Longhena (1598–1682). After the 1630 plague, he designed the Church of Santa Maria della Salute with a central plan. The octagonal basilica includes a sanctuary flanked by two apses, inspired by Palladio's Il Redentore, enhancing the temple's longitudinal axis. The Baroque style is evident in its grand external structure along the Grand Canal, featuring an octagonal body with a large dome, a shrine and two bell towers.

Longhena also excelled in civic architecture. At Ca' Pesaro, he used a traditional layout but added a Baroque touch with intricate facade decorations that play with light and shadow. His detailed dramatic style peaked with the façade of Santa Maria dei Derelitti (1670s), adorned with atlantes, giant heads and lion masks.

=== Genoa ===
In Genoa, starting in the late 16th century, Baroque architecture produced grand buildings considered some of Italy's finest. One example is the Palazzo Doria Tursi, where the vestibule's layout and indoor garden, accessed by a wide staircase, create a sense of depth and movement.

Bartolomeo Bianco (1590–1657) adopted this approach in his masterpiece, the Jesuit college (now the University of Genoa, c.1634). The U-shaped building integrates the interior and the courtyard more effectively. Using the steep terrain, Bianco created striking urban scenery with a wide porch, layered arches, and stairways.

== See also ==
- Italian Baroque
- Italian Baroque interior design
- Timeline of Italian architecture
