= Lorenzo Binago =

Italian architect

Lorenzo Binago (1554 – 9 February 1629) was an Italian late Mannerist/early Baroque architect in Milan. He was by vocation, also a Barnabite monk.

One of his pupils was the future architect Francesco Maria Richini. His major work is the influential church of Sant'Alessandro in Zebedia, begun in 1601. The bell towers to this church are a late addition.
