= Palazzo Annoni =

Coordinates: 45.4597°N 9.1894°E

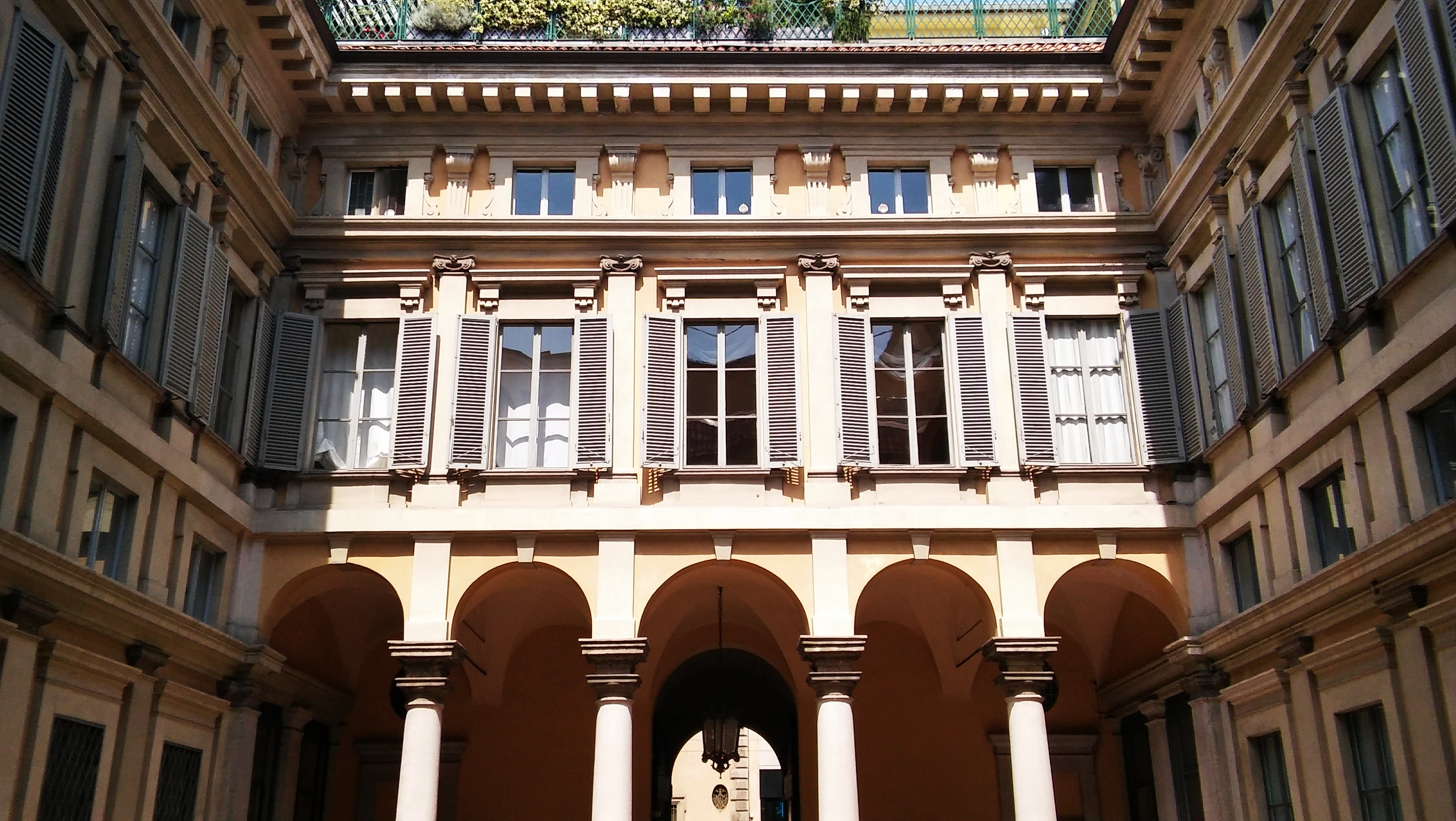
Courtyard of the palace

Palazzo Annoni (also known as Palazzo Annoni-Cicogna Mozzoni) is a 17th-century Baroque building in Milan, Italy. It is located at nr. 6 of Corso di Porta Romana.

== History ==
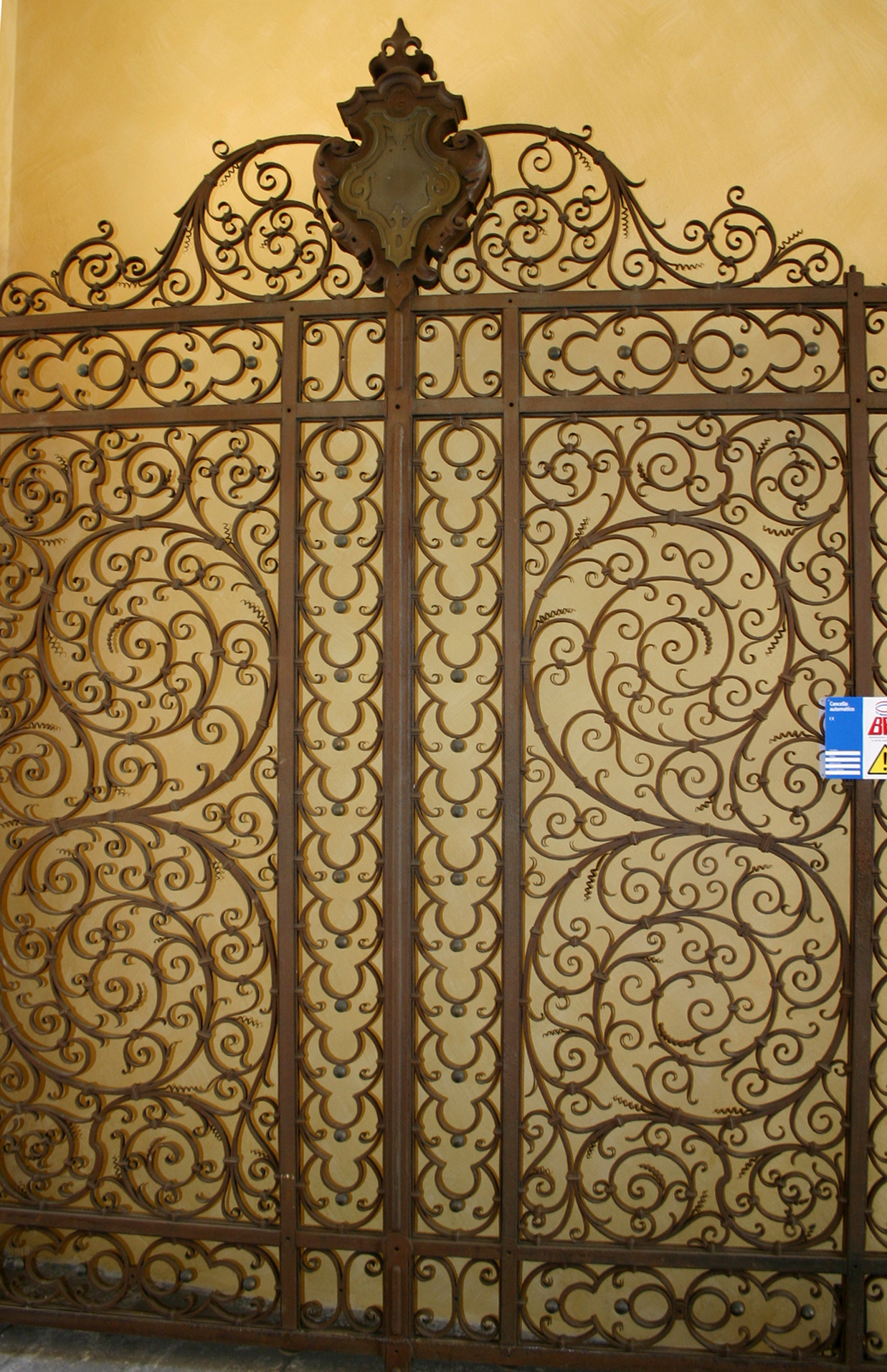
Detail of the entrance gate

The construction of the building began in 1631 on a design by architect Francesco Maria Richini for the rich silk merchant Paolo Annoni. Chronicles from the 17th Centuries report that rivalry between the Annoni and the Acerbi (the family that owned the building located opposite to Palazzo Annoni, on the other side of the street) had those families competing for the most beautiful building.

Between 1712 and 1778 Carlo Annoni, descendant of Paolo, adapted the Palazzo to serve as an artistic and cultural centre, with a rich library and a collection of paintings by Rubens and Van Dyck. The painting were later confiscated during the Austrian occupation of Milan, in 1848.

The palace was severely damaged during World War II and restored between 1955 and 1961.
