= Italian Baroque interior design =

17th- and 18th-century furnishing style

Italian Baroque interior design refers to high-style furnishing and interior decorating carried out in Italy during the Baroque period, which lasted from the early 17th to the mid-18th century. In provincial areas, Baroque forms such as the clothes-press or armadio continued to be used into the 19th century.

== History, influences and background ==
In the late 16th century, Rome, the seat of an extremely powerful and influential papacy, was struggling with the advent of Protestantism. Responding to the Protestant Reformation, the Curia started the Counter-Reformation (after the Council of Trent), a period in which Church policies and influence abroad would be strengthened. Amidst this Catholic Reformation, popes in Rome hired architects, painters and interior designers to re-decorate the city and improve its public decorum, creating several new palaces and churches, and re-designing the interiors of several papal buildings. Decorations were richer and more grandiose than those of the Renaissance, and the movement evolved into the Baroque style, which later spread across the whole of Italy and later Europe.

In keeping with these new architectural styles, new furnishing styles also emerged, for which architects even as pre-eminent as Bernini were called upon to provide designs. In his Opus architectonicum Borromini described in detail the furniture he designed for the Chiesa Nova, including reused priests' bookcases. Carlo Fontana was called upon shortly after 1692 to design a supporting base for a porphyry tavola, or table-slab, for the bapistry of St Peter's; it was enriched with bronze ornaments and the Pignatelli arms of Pope Innocent XI. Architects had been called upon since the days of Buontalenti to design such marble or pietra dura tables on bases for the centers of grand spaces.

As this was an age where learning and patronage of the arts were considered desirable pursuits for nobles, the bookcase came out of the private studiolo to furnish state apartments as an object of display. Among new forms of furniture in parade apartments, free-standing bookcases were no longer built into the structure of rooms. Lavish bookcases started to be made, often with gilded marble columns and intricate designs.

Roman carvers' shops outshone the more modest craft of cabinetmaking, as demanding commissions overseen by architects for carved decors, frames, altar candle stands, confessionals and pulpits came in a steady stream to furnish churches and semi-public chapels. In secular apartments of parade, richly carved, painted and gilded frames came from the same shops. Carved frames and case furniture had come to rival the former primacy of textiles in the course of the 16th century. Baroque objects were grand in scale in proportion to the interiors they occupied, and were ornamented with cartouches, swags and drops of boldly scaled fruits and flowers, open scrollwork and carvings of human figures, which swarmed over and all but effaced the tectonic forms that supported them, making them look majestic and royal in appearance.

Frescoed galleries of the city's many palazzi were lined with elaborate console tables set against the piers and between windows. In ceilings the new popular style of frescoing emerged, known as the quadratura from its elaborate framing, was reflected in the framing of large looking-glasses assembled from six to eighteen panes of Venetian mirror-glass, themselves crafted in larger dimensions than ever.

In Florence, grand cabinets known as stippone (plural:stipponi) came to be produced in ducal workshops, thought to have been inspired from Augsburg cabinets. They had many shells and carved foliages, and were decorated with expensive materials, such as gilt bronze, ebony and pietra dura. Around 1667, Leonardo van der Vinne, a well-known cabinet maker from the Low Countries became part of the ducal workshops.

In Genoa, grand console tables supporting huge marble slabs on carved gilt bases came to be made. The offer of an armchair continued to convey elite status: inventories record a single one or a pair in rooms where the seating otherwise was on armless side-chairs, sgabelli of traditional construction – now enriched with bold sculpture – and stools. Chairs made by the Genoese were made with rich fabrics, often silk or velvet, to accord with the hangings and were often gilded with gold or silver.

After the mid-17th century, the state bed also came to provide the expected climax of the sequence of rooms in a Baroque apartment, following precedents established in France. Late-17th century Italian beds were usually grand in scale, often with elaborate wooden backs and fabric drapes. They were usually similar in style throughout the nation, but textiles varied by region.

Italian baroque furnishing also had considerable Eastern influences. Venetians, who at the time still held a vast sea empire, often imported rich fabrics and materials from other nations to enrich their furniture with eastern influences. Their furniture was chiefly sumptuous and luxurious, and included rich silks and green and gold lacquer.

However, in Italy, there were considerable differences in the interior design of a grand palazzo than that of a normal house. Palazzi were usually lavish and sumptuous, whilst middle-class town/country houses were usually much plainer, with simple wooden beds, x-framed chairs and big cassoni, or chests.

== Motifs ==
- Putti
- Banderoles(lots of ribbons)
- Volutes
- S- and C-shaped scrolls
- Large foliated scrolls
- Grotesque
- Human figures
- Heraldic devices
- Arabesque
- Vases of flowers
- Cornucopious
- Architectural elements
- Palmettes
- Shell shapes

== Italian Baroque characteristics ==
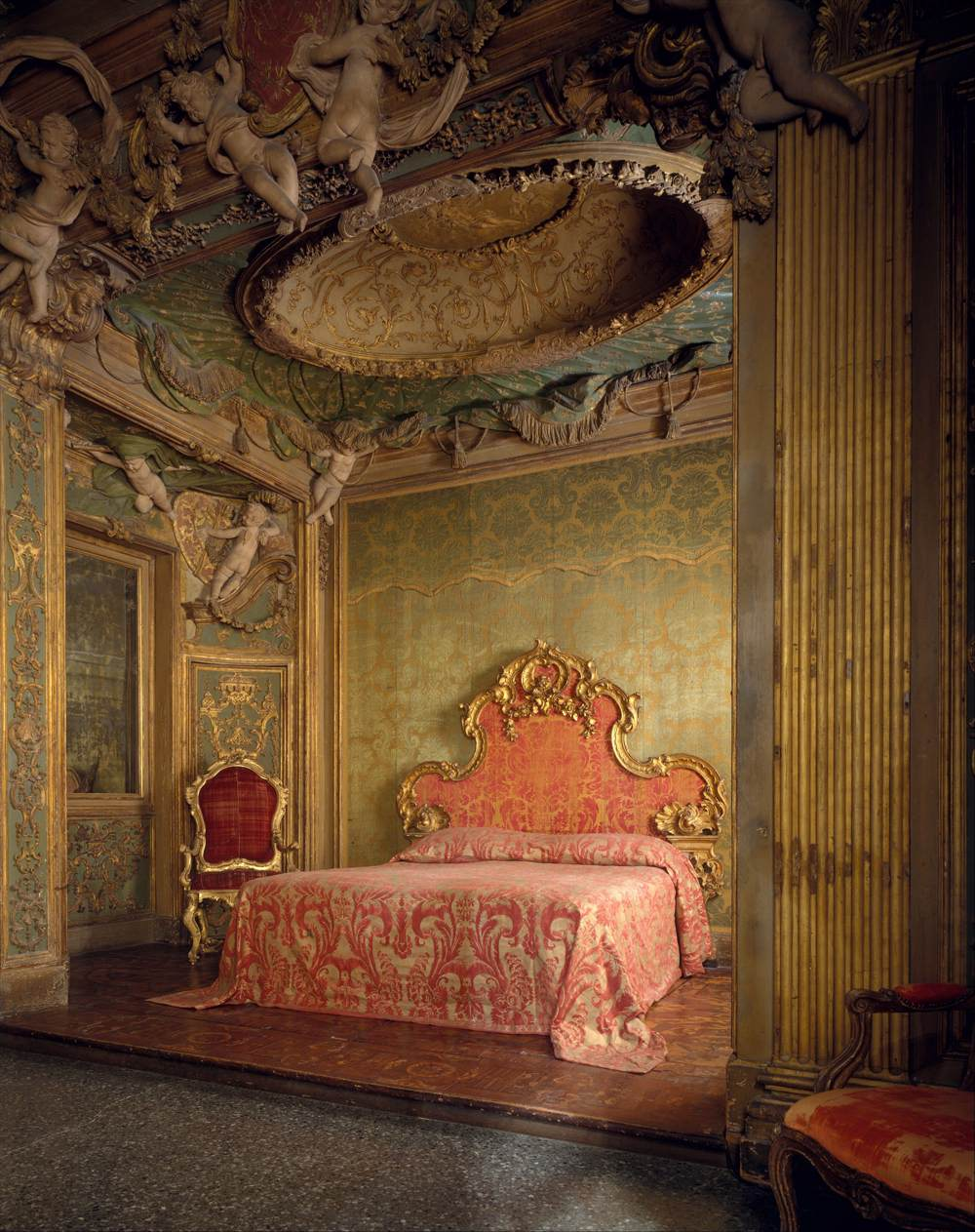
Bedroom, Palazzo Sagredo 1718

The general characteristics of the Baroque style are defined by it being a very grandiose style that emphasises a very large scale, and movement away from rectangular shapes towards more oval designs. Rectangular furniture like chairs or beds would have ornaments or carvings applied to them where lines and angles are curved out. There was also emphasis on theatricality; use of light and color and design are major factors in raising the sense of drama. Texture became more important and forms more open.

An Italian Baroque bedroom would feature some of the typical classical furnishings, with robust pieces that are heavily carved, and built in pieces in interior spaces. The Palazzo Sagredo bedroom, considered one of the finest examples of interior design from the period, features stucco carved in wood, and an abundance of detail in carvings around the room.

== Different sorts of furnishings ==
Furnishings

Baroque furnishings in general have common characteristics such as being anchored to walls with undecorated backs, different woods including rosewood, ebony and tortoiseshell, carved elaborately and furnished with legs that are either straight, bracketed, or in Flemish scroll design.

Chairs

Arm chairs had high backs and were primarily rectangular. Genoese chairs were made with rich fabrics like velvet or silk and often were gilded with gold. Arm chairs conveyed elite status and armless chairs a lower status.

Ormolu

A gold colored alloy of copper, zinc and sometimes tin, one usually uses gold leaf or composite metals rather than gold. It is then applied to decorate ornamental furniture surfaces, especially favored in the 18th century.

=== Gilded frames ===
Gilded frames frequently were used in paintings and mirrors, and usually consisted of several cartouches, carved flowers and sculptural figures.

=== Cassoni ===
A cassone an Italian chest. Cassoni usually had raised lids, and often were decorated with carved leaves and/or figures. Cassoni found in affluent homes often were far grander and more elaborate, even though they were nearly always wooden, however, in middle-class homes chests were simpler and retained Mannerist/Renaissance features like paw feet, strapwork and segmented panels.

=== (Florentine) console tables ===
Florentine Console tables often were sumptuous and richly decorated. Carved wood often was gilded in gold or bronze, and table legs were mainly caryatids or muscular figures made to appear as if they were holding the marble slab on top. Most of their themes were copied or nearly identical to their Roman counterparts, but the Florentines became famous for these designs.

=== (Florentine) cabinet ===
Florentine cabinets usually were very similar to those of the Renaissance, with but few changes. Segments and strapwork was still used, however, new features were also included such as pilasters, arched panels and pietra dura designs. Often religious or mythological themes were drawn inside the panels to decorate the object.

=== Lion commode ===
Lion commodes often were made of walnut or oak, pearl, jewels and ivory, crafted in fantastical and allegorical designs incorporating angels, animals, leaves, saints and flowers. They were called lion commodes specifically due to their lion-shaped feet at the bottom of the piece.

=== Tables ===
Tables varied greatly during the Baroque period, but often were made of gilded wood, oak or walnut. Large tables were long, rich and sumptuous, whilst smaller ones were usually ornate and geometric. Tables often had marble tops but varied from table to table.

=== Quadratura ===
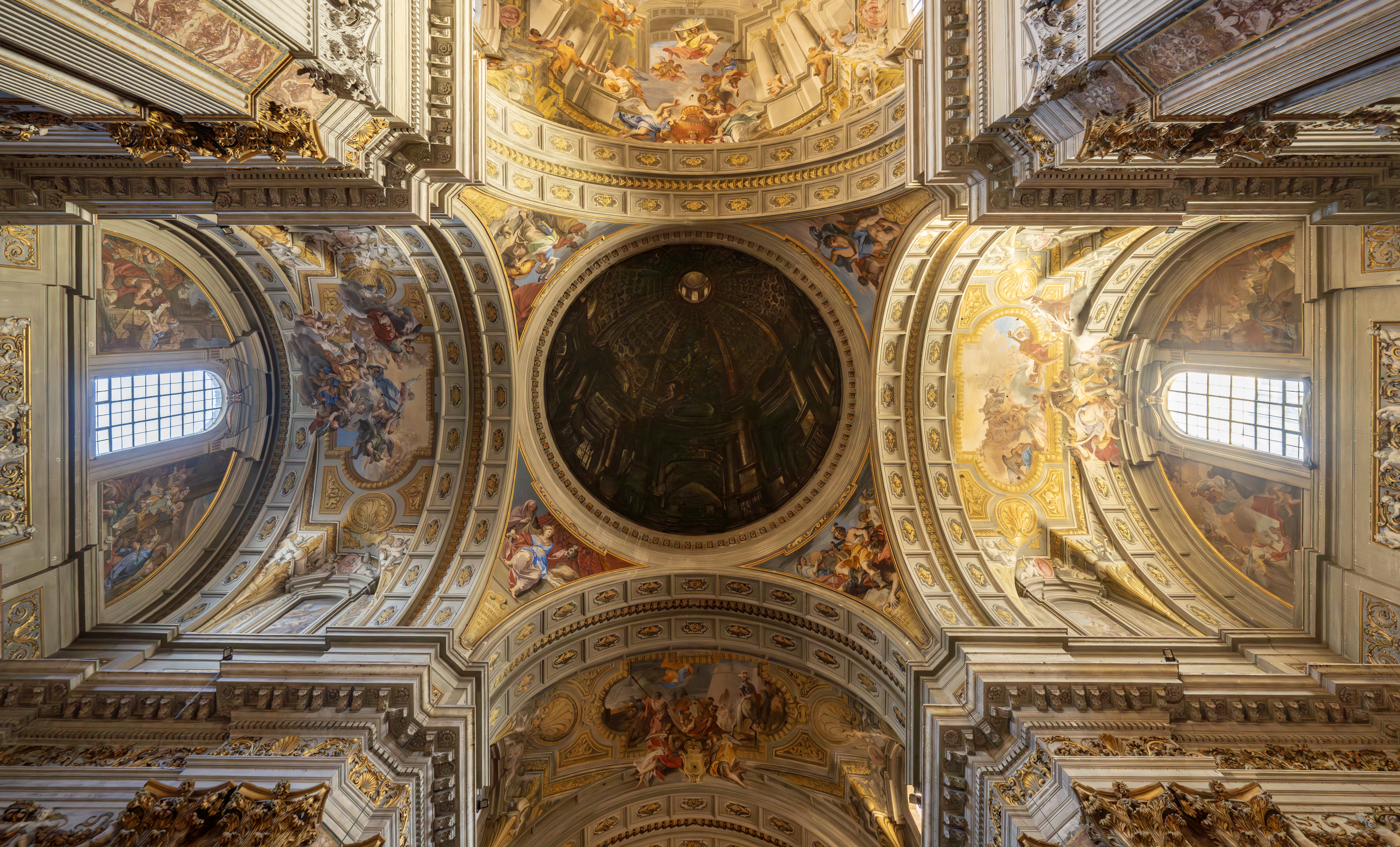
The illustionistic perspective of Andrea Pozzo's trompe-l'oeil dome at Sant'Ignazio (1685) creates an illusion of an actual architectural space on what is, in actuality, a slightly concave painted surface.

Quadratura, a term introduced in the 17th century and also used in English, became popular with Baroque artists. Although it can also refer to the "opening up" of walls through architectural illusion, the term is most-commonly associated with Italian ceiling painting. Unlike other trompe-l'oeil techniques or precedent di sotto in sù ceiling decorations, which often rely on intuitive artistic approaches to deception, quadratura is directly tied to 17th-century theories of perspective and representation of architectural space. Due to its reliance on perspective theory, it more fully unites architecture, painting and sculpture and gives a more overwhelming impression of illusionism than earlier examples.

The artist would paint a feigned architecture in perspective on a flat or barrel-vaulted ceiling in such a way that it seems to continue the existing architecture. The perspective of this illusion is centered towards one focal point. The steep foreshortening of the figures, the painted walls and pillars, creates an illusion of deep recession, heavenly sphere or even an open sky. Paintings on ceilings could, for example, simulate statues in niches or openings revealing the sky.

Quadratura may also employ other illusionistic painting techniques, such as anamorphosis.

Examples of illusionistic painting include:

- Andrea Pozzo at San Ignazio in Rome and the Jesuit church in Vienna. He wrote the standard theoretical work of his artistic ideas in the two volumes of : Perspectiva pictorum et architectorum Andreae Putei a societate Jesu (Rome, 1693–1700).
- Pietro da Cortona at the Palazzo Barberini,
- Gianbattista Tiepolo in the Ca' Rezzonico in Venice, Villa Pisani at Stra, and the throne room at the Royal Palace of Madrid.

Other examples were by Paolo Veronese at Villa Rotonda in Vicenza and Baldassare Peruzzi in the Villa Farnesina of Rome.

== Gallery ==
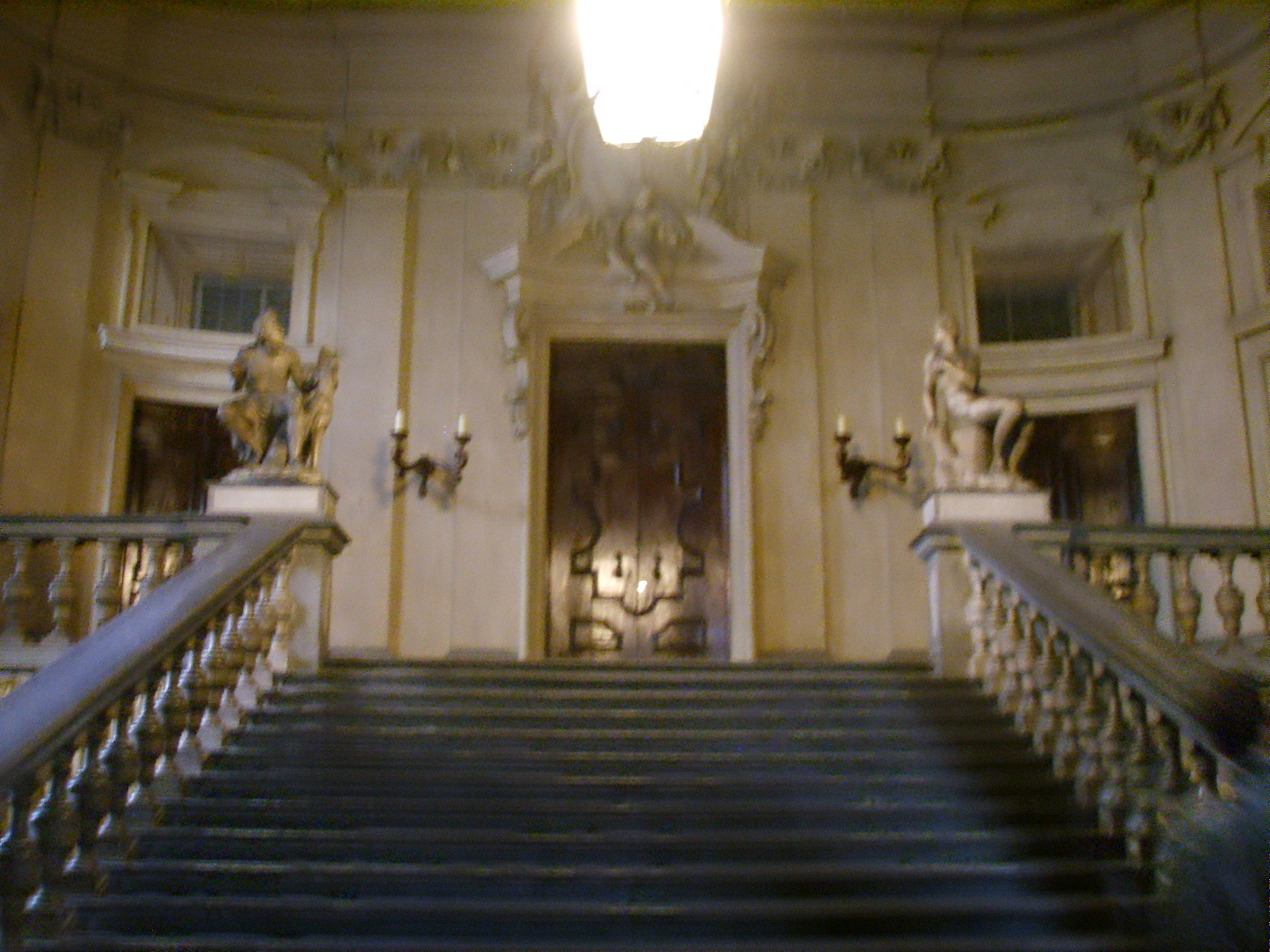
The Baroque interior of the Palazzo Corsini, in Florence

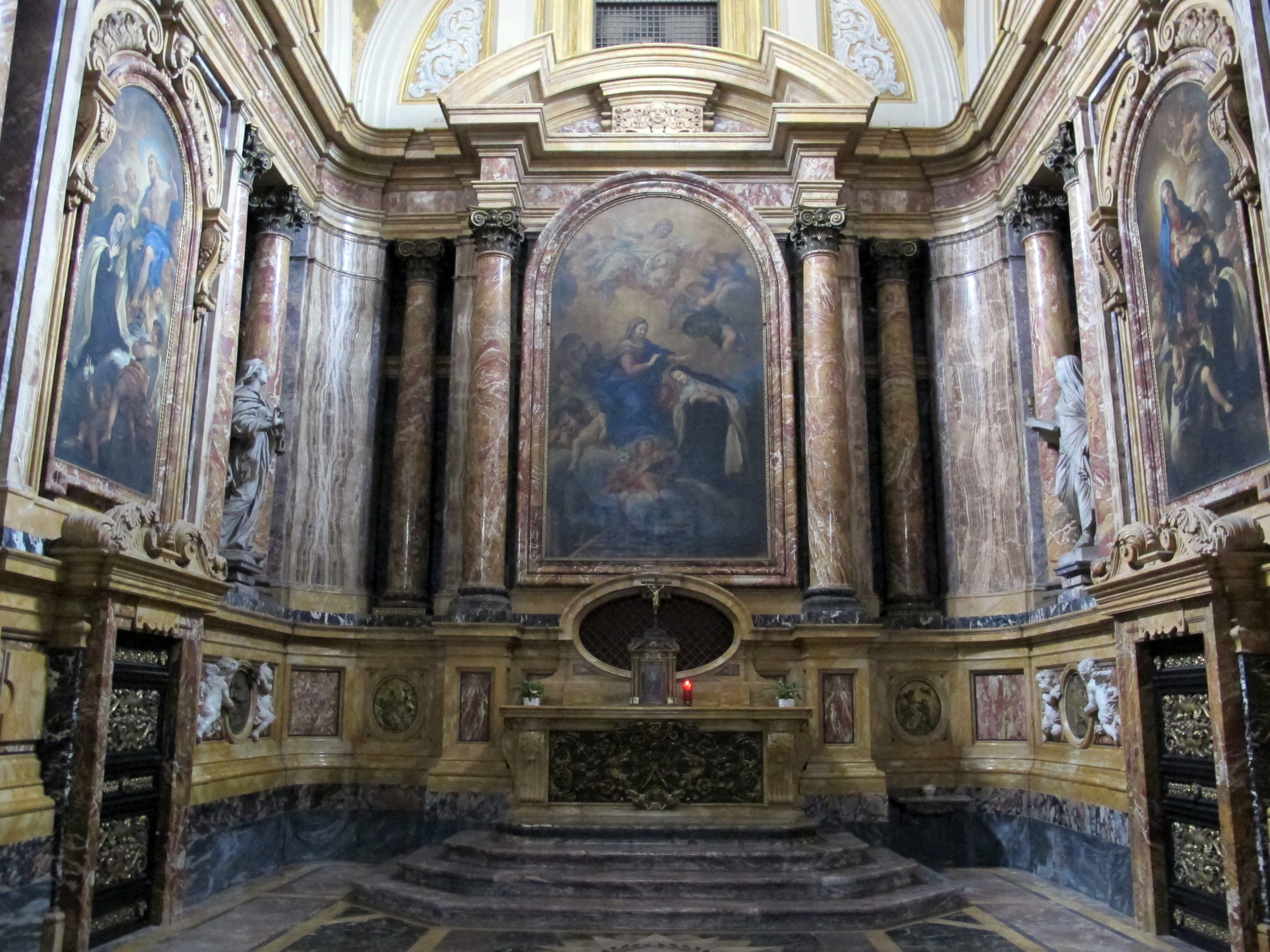
A Baroque altar in the Church of Santa Maria Maddalena in Florence

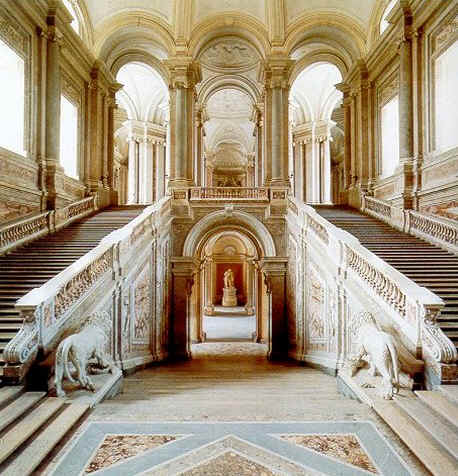
The Baroque staircase in the Palace of Caserta

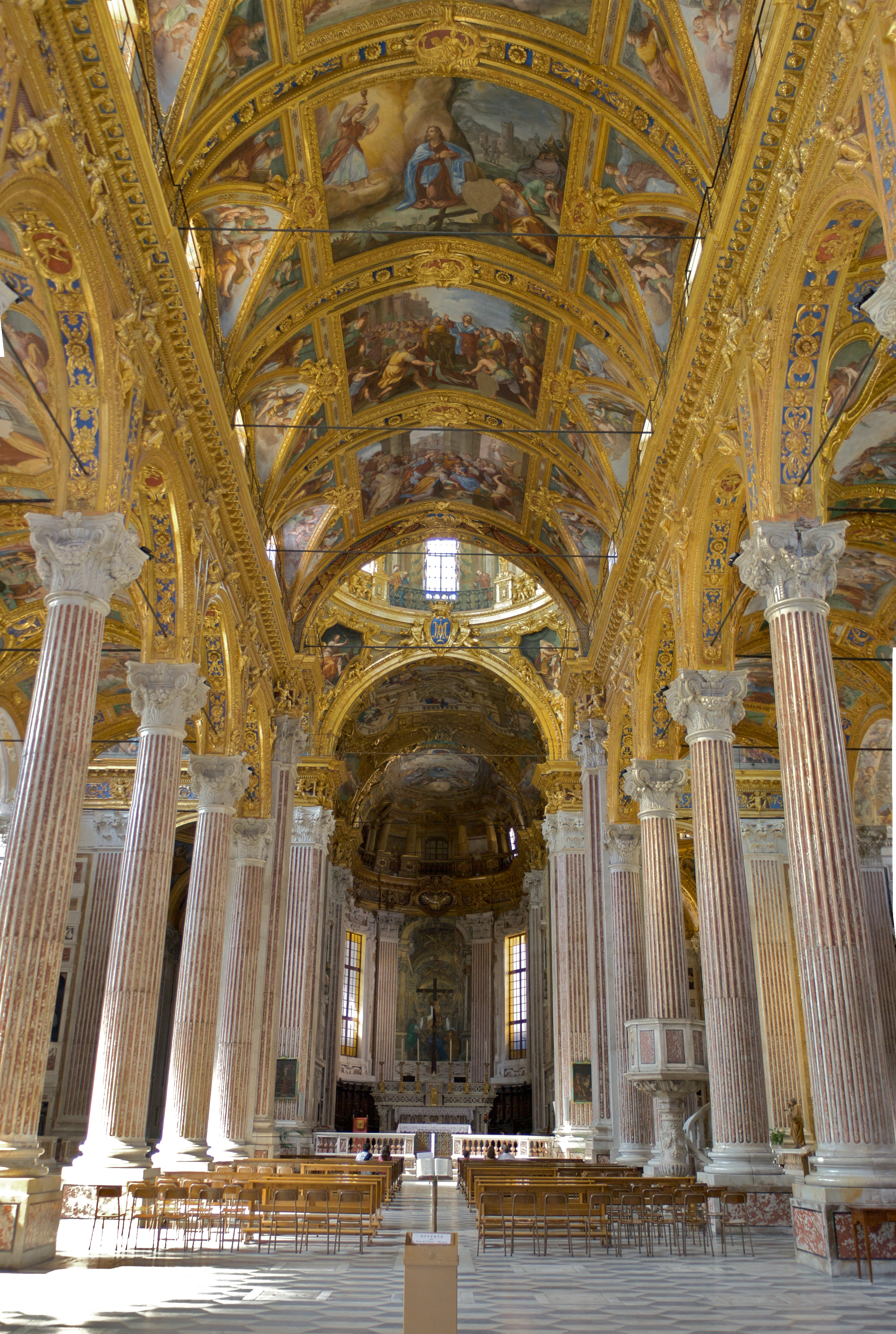
The Baroque Basilica della Santissima Annunziata del Vastato in Genoa

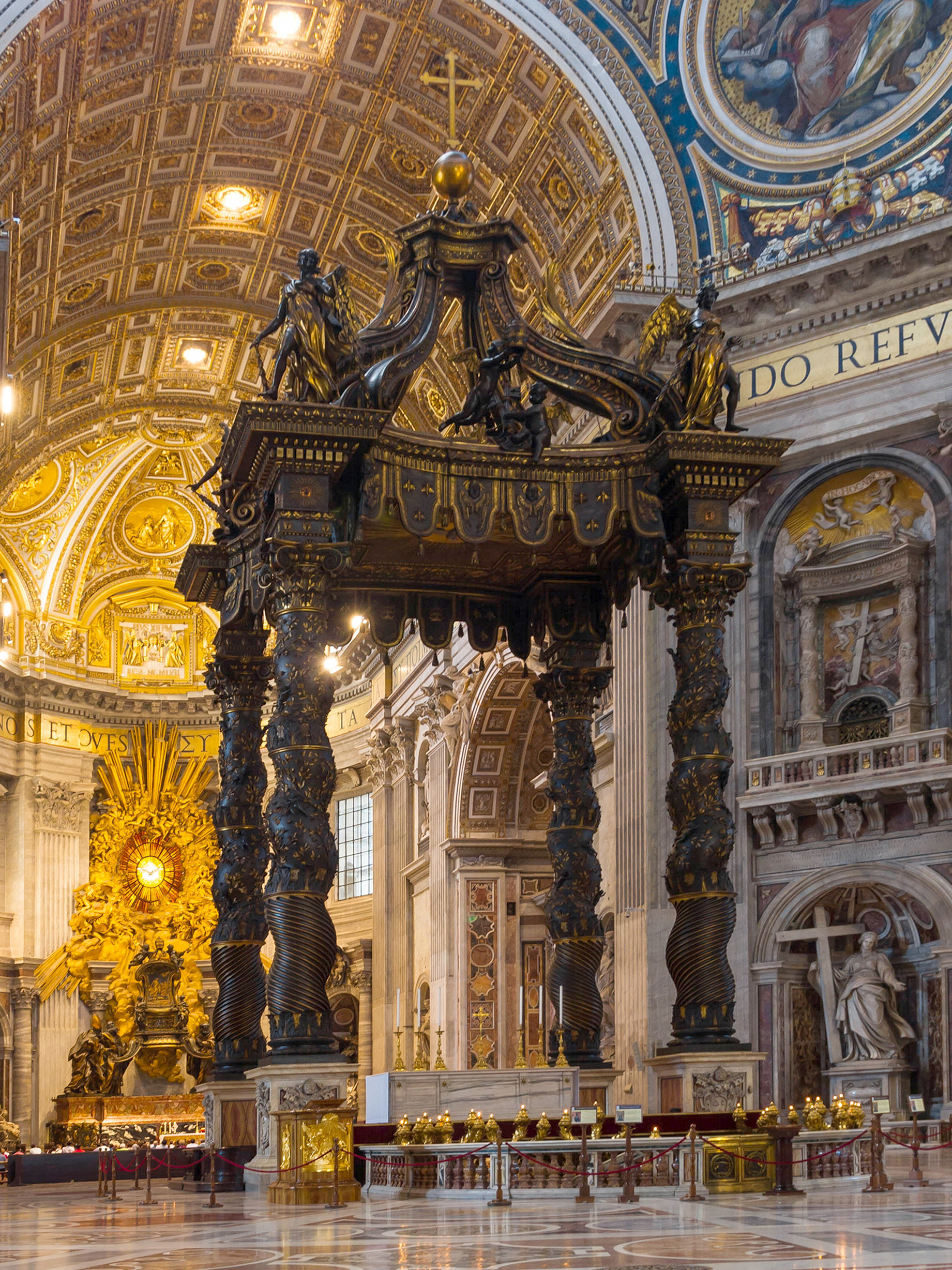
The Baroque Baldacchino in St Peter's Basilica, Rome

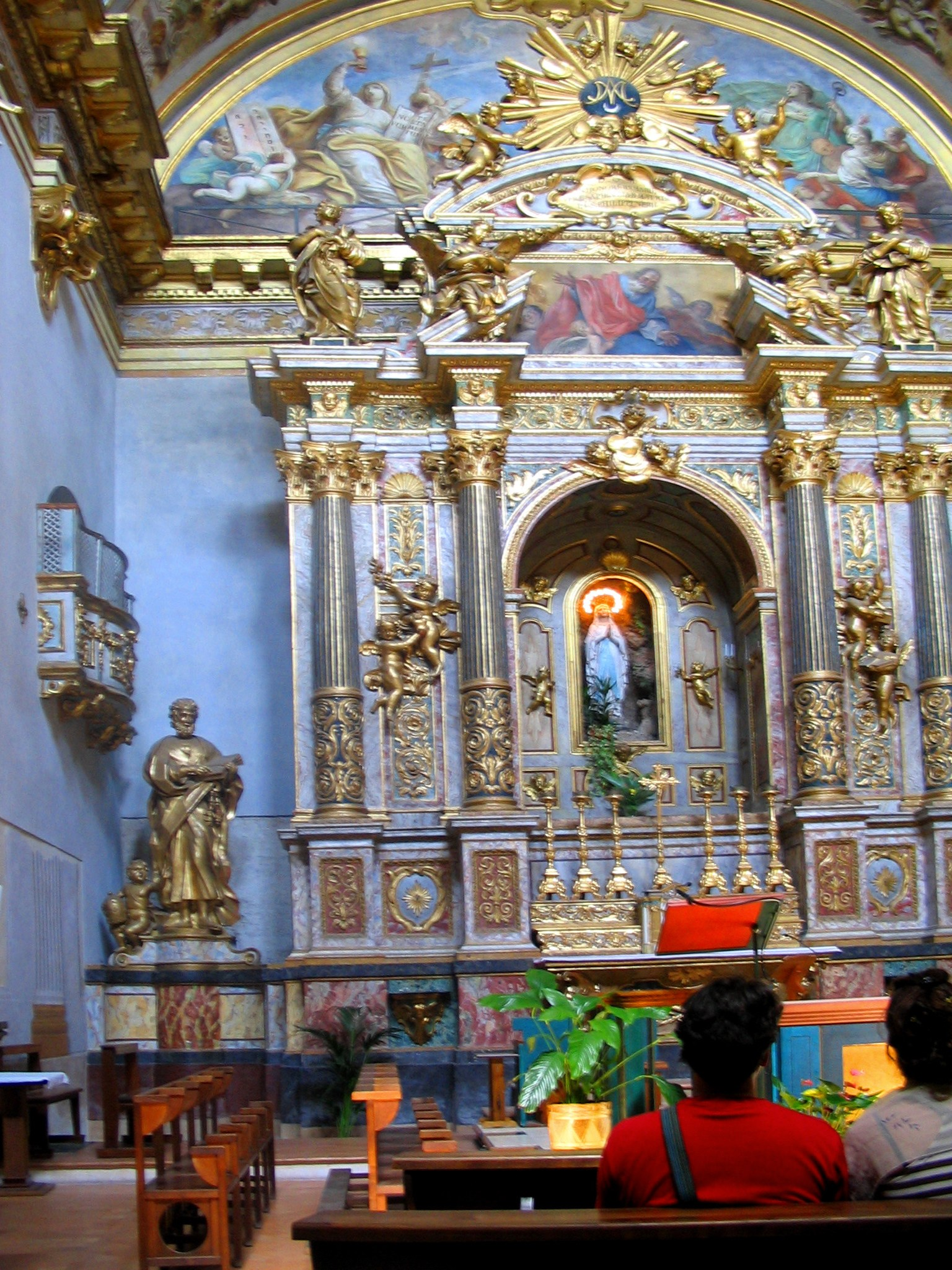
Santa Maria sopra Minerva Church in Assisi's Baroque altar

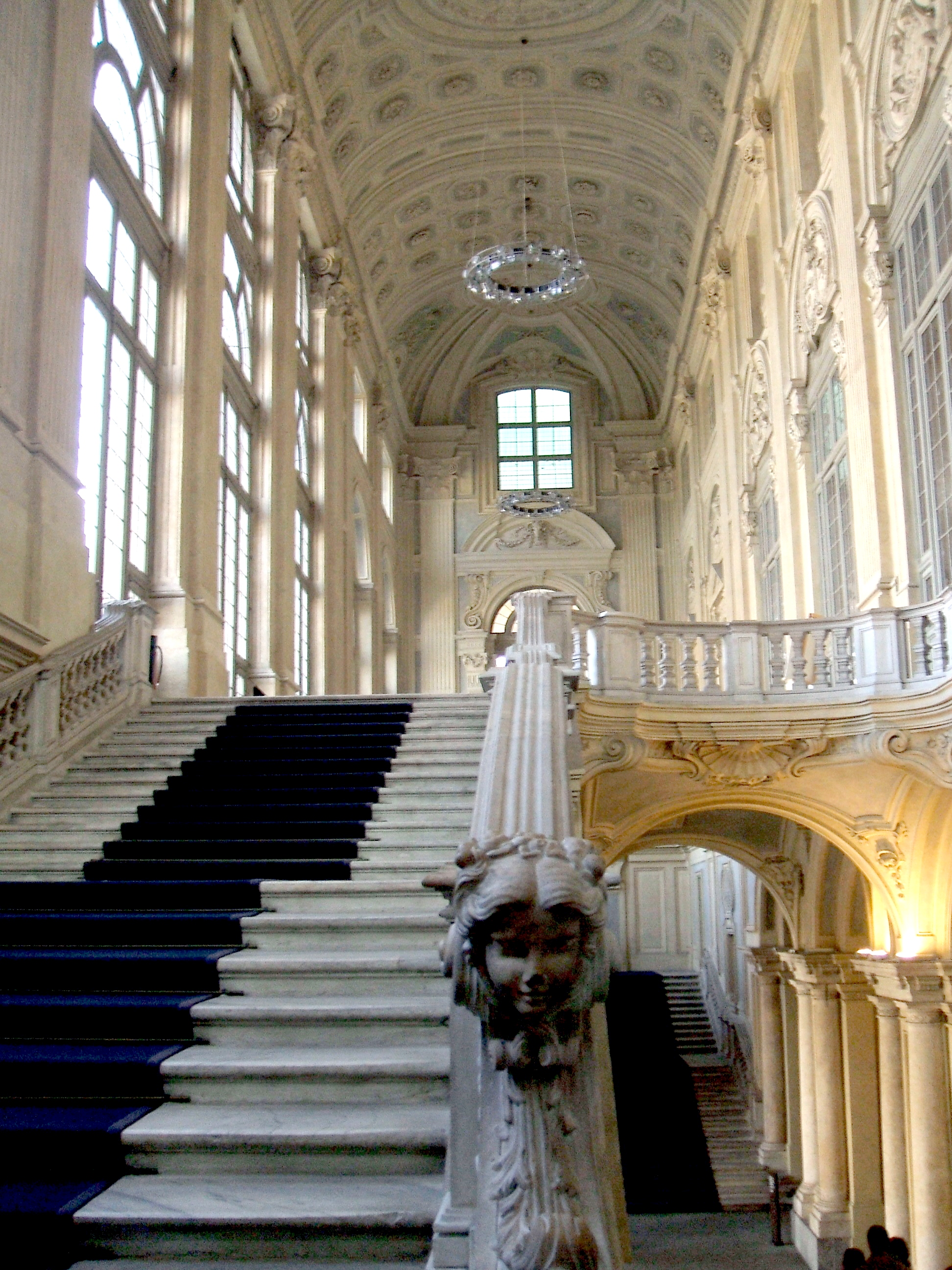
The staircase of the Baroque Palazzo Madama, Turin

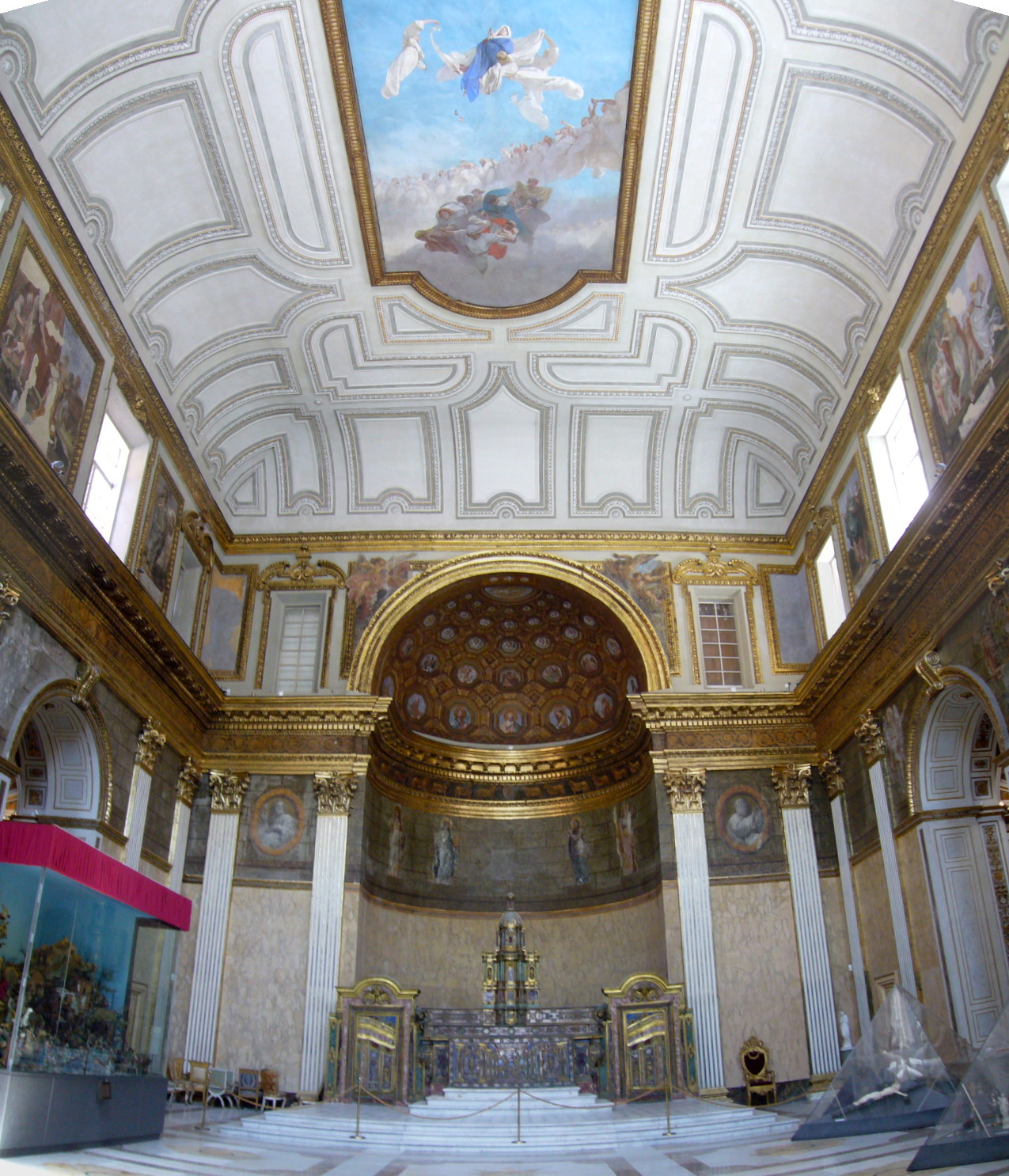
The Chapel of the Royal Palace of Naples

== See also ==
- Italian Baroque
- Italian Baroque architecture

== Bibliography ==
- Miller, Judith (2005). Furniture: world styles from classical to contemporary. DK Publishing. ISBN 0-7566-1340-X.
