= Francesco Maria Richini =

Italian architect (1584–1658)

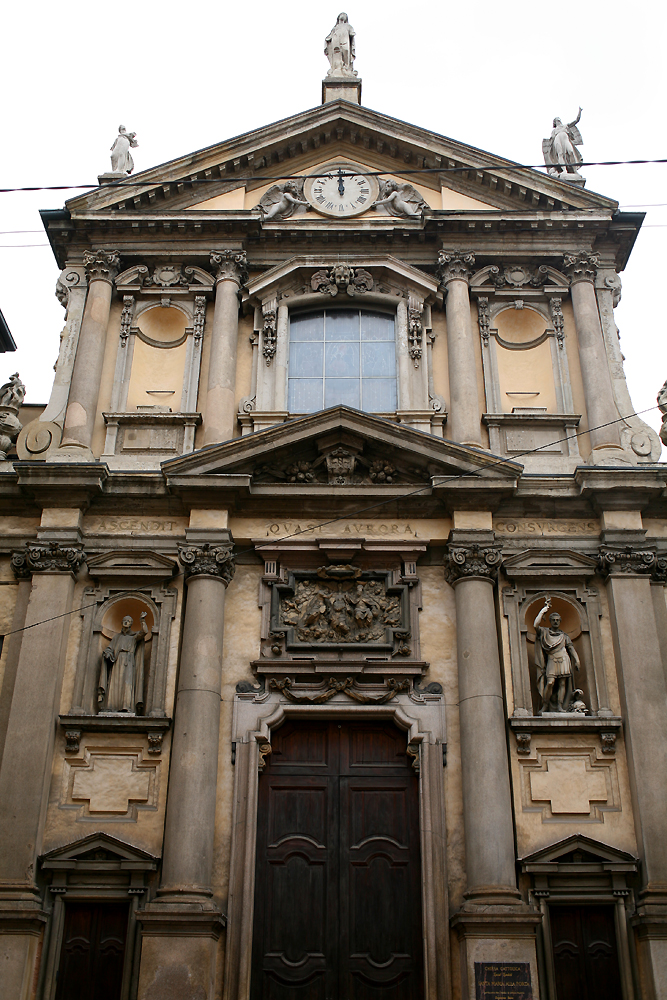
- Façade of Santa Maria alla Porta, Milan
- Born: 9 February 1584; Milan, Duchy of Milan
- Died: 24 April 1658 (aged 74); Milan, Duchy of Milan
- Education: Lorenzo Binago
- Known for: Architecture
- Notable work: San Giuseppe, Milan; Santa Maria alla Porta, Milan; Palazzo Annoni; Palazzo Brera; Collegio Elvetico
- Movement: Milanese Baroque

Francesco Maria Richini (also spelled Ricchini) (9 February 1584 – 24 April 1658) was an Italian Baroque architect. He rivalled his contemporary Carlo Maderno in Rome in the intensity of his effort to discard the bonds of Counter-Reformation conservatism. Richini was an early influence of Francesco Borromini.

== Early life and education ==
Francesco Maria Richini was born in Milan on 9 February 1584. He was the son of Bernardo Richini, a military architect. He trained under Lorenzo Binago, and at the beginning of the 17th century he made his first trip to Rome, under the sponsorship of Cardinal Federico Borromeo, Archbishop of Milan. Like his elder cousin, Charles Borromeo, author of the principal Counter-Reformation tract on architecture Instructiones fabricae et suppellectilis ecclesiasticae (1572), the Cardinal favoured an austere response to the eccentricities of Mannerism. Richini’s immediate predecessors and contemporaries in Milan were willing and able to satisfy this taste, but the young Richini, who returned to Milan in 1603, had clearly been impressed by the more progressive architectural developments in Rome.

== Ecclesiastical works ==
=== Milan Cathedral ===
Like many of the most important Milanese architects before and after him, Ricchini was involved with the continuing work on the city’s cathedral. Shortly after his return from Rome in 1603, he presented to his patron, Cardinal Borromeo, his own designs for the unfinished façade. With the Cardinal’s support, Ricchini was appointed capomastro of the cathedral in March 1605, under the architect Aurelio Trezzi (fl. 1598–1616). In this capacity, Richini supervised the early stages of work on the façade to designs by Pellegrino Tibaldi dating from the late 16th century, while continuing to propose variations of his own that were influenced by his recent experience of aedicular façades in Rome. Richini’s involvement in the debate over the façade won him enemies within Milan’s architectural establishment, but with the support of his powerful patron he became architect and engineer to the cathedral in July 1631, after which he was chiefly occupied with work on the tomb of Charles Borromeo in the crypt.

Construction proceeded slowly on the façade, for which he completed the main interior portal to his own design, as well as external door and window surrounds to designs by Tibaldi. With the death of Cardinal Borromeo in 1631, however, support for Richini from within the cathedral chapter diminished, and he was dismissed in July 1638. Nevertheless, his expertise continued to be sought by the cathedral authorities, particularly after Carlo Buzzi’s submission of his designs for a Gothic façade in 1645. Richini’s early contributions to the scheme are virtually obscured by the Gothicisms with which the façade was finally completed in 1806–13 following orders given by Napoleon.

=== San Giuseppe and other works ===
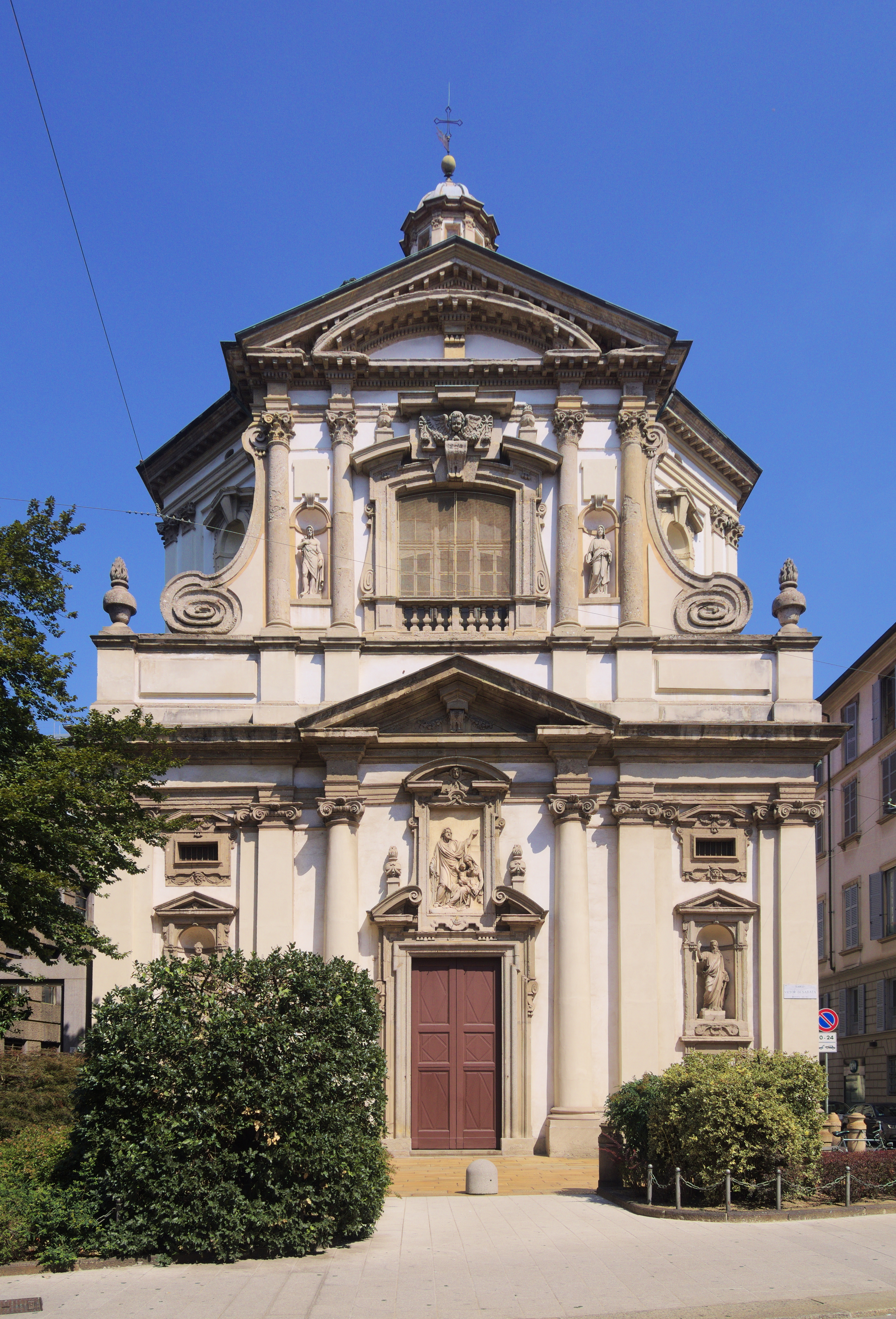
Façade of San Giuseppe, Milan

Ricchini’s first independent commission was for the church of San Giuseppe (1607–16) in Milan. Its plan conjoins two Greek crosses, providing a large domed nave and a smaller, vaulted choir. Such an arrangement constitutes a much simplified variation of Lorenzo Binago’s church of Sant'Alessandro in Zebedia (1601), Milan, which itself was influenced by the designs for St. Peter's Basilica, Rome, by Michelangelo and Bramante, and by earlier precedents in Lombard architecture. Nevertheless, Richini’s adaptation of Binago’s model within the tight confines of the site of San Giuseppe resulted in one of the earliest truly Baroque church spaces. The short arms of the nave (225 sq. m) appear to compress the space, as do the bevelled corners with their flanking three-quarter columns, thereby forcing the viewer’s attention either upwards to the dome of the nave or towards the high altar at the far side of the choir. Richini thus succeeded not only in retaining the domed centralized form and its symbolism so prized by Renaissance architects, but also in implementing the traditional longitudinal focus on the high altar as dictated by the reforms of Charles Borromeo. A unity was achieved, moreover, through the use of the composite order in both the nave and choir, as well as through the adoption in both parts of the church of the same ground-plan. With this design, Richini effectively defined new territory for Baroque architects, which would be further explored by Baldassare Longhena in Venice (Santa Maria della Salute; begun 1631), Carlo Rainaldi in Rome (Santa Maria in Campitelli; 1662–7) and Filippo Juvarra in Turin (the Basilica of Superga; 1716–31), among others.

The façade (1629–30) of San Giuseppe, an aedicular composition flanked by volutes and incorporating a number of Mannerist devices, is derived from the façade (1568–75) by Giacomo Barozzi da Vignola and Giacomo della Porta for the Church of the Gesù in Rome, although the more immediate precedent was Maderno’s façade (1597–1603) of Santa Susanna, also in Rome. The façade of San Giuseppe is skilfully integrated with the staged octagonal dome, the drum of which, set on a square base, is continuous on one plane with the ground storey of the façade. Such a design is similar to the church of Santa Maria di Loreto, Rome, which was begun in 1502 by Antonio da Sangallo the Younger and completed in 1585 by Giacomo del Duca, who built the drum and dome. The discord at Santa Maria di Loreto between the original base and the later drum was avoided at San Giuseppe by Richini’s use of the Roman aedicular composition. The continuous vertical articulation harmoniously links the lower and upper storeys, while the volutes mediate between the outer bays of the façade at ground level and the receding sides of the drum. This solution, with its tentative dynamic interplay between church and façade, sets San Giuseppe apart from contemporary examples of this type in Rome, for which the façade was still largely a virtually flat and independent element screening the church from the street. Only the next generation of High Baroque architects in Rome would succeed in accomplishing the demise of this aesthetic.

At Busto Arsizio, near Milan, Richini began work in 1607 on the basilica of Church of Saint John the Baptist. Many of the churches designed by Richini after 1611, the year of his admission to the Milanese College of Architects and Engineers, have been destroyed or remodelled or were completed by other architects after his death; thus, while he was one of the most prolific of northern Italian architects, it is difficult to make an accurate assessment of his contribution to the Baroque. What is known of his projects is derived mainly from surviving fragments, including the elaborate gateway of the Seminario Maggiore (c. 1640) in Milan, where caryatids representing the Christian virtues support a pediment surmounted by a low attic bearing the Borromeo arms. His work is also known from surviving drawings (Milan, Sforza Castle), which include many projects for architectural ephemera.

Richini worked also for the Collegio Borromeo in Pavia and the Certosa di Pavia (1625). He designed the Altar of Our Lady of the Assumption in the Como Cathedral, a work that lasted several decades and was completed in 1686.

== Secular works ==
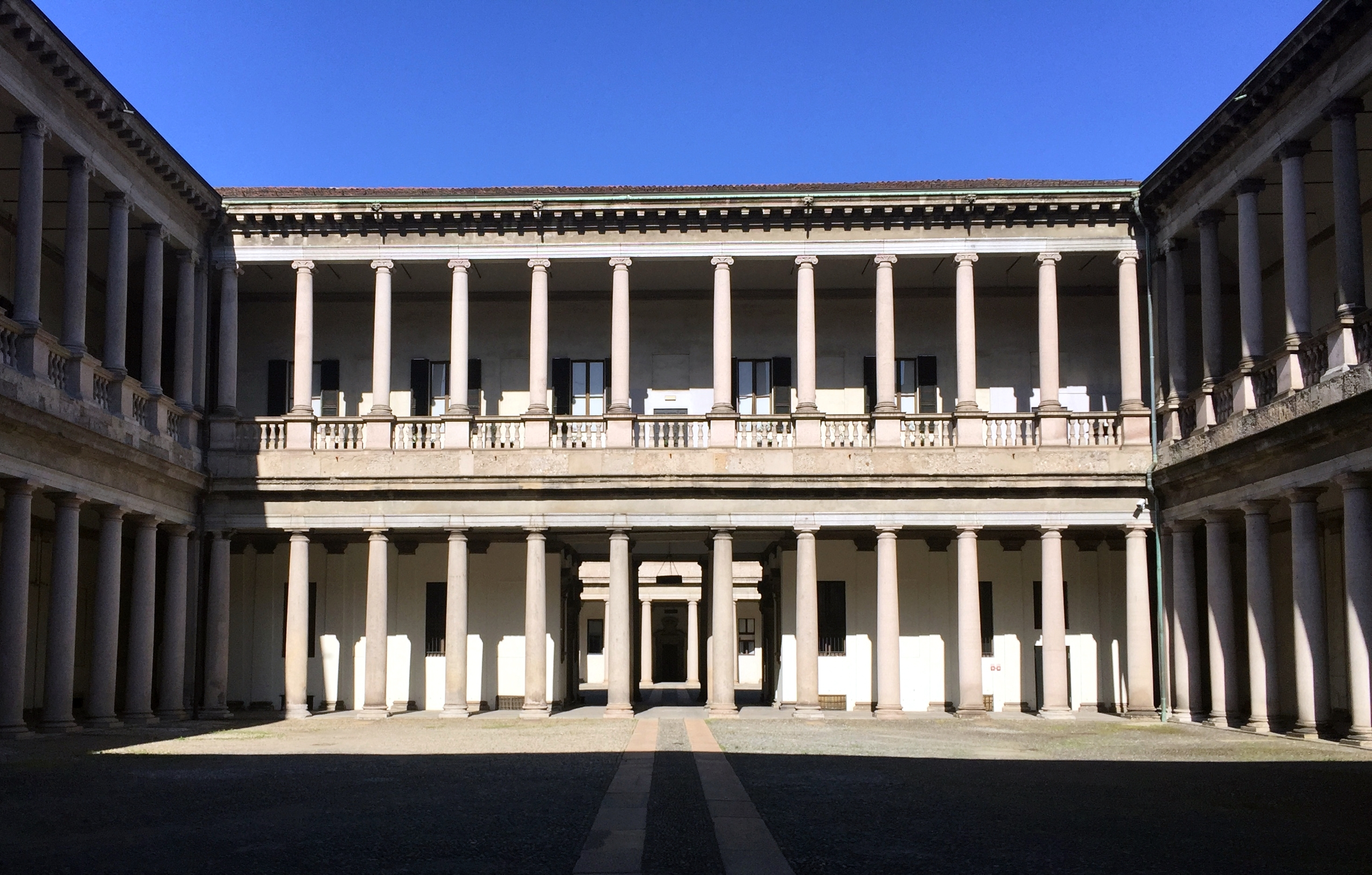
Courtyard of the Collegio Elvetico, Milan

Richini’s secular architecture also made original contributions to the Baroque. In the late 1620s he designed an aedicular façade for the entrance to the Ospedale Maggiore in Milan, where he also collaborated with Giovanni Battista Pessina, Fabio Mangone and Giovanni Battista Crespi on the large courtyard (1625–49). In 1627 he designed the street front of the Collegio Elvetico (now the Archivio di Stato) in Milan, the first instance in the 17th century of a concave palace façade. Although only two storeys high, the façade was influenced by examples in Rome, including Antonio da Sangallo the Younger’s Palazzo Farnese (begun 1541), and it comprises plain stuccowork with quoins at the angles, a deep cornice, pedimented window surrounds set on continuous dados and a dominant central portal and balcony. Richini’s façade departs from the severity of its model, however, as the central five of the seven bays are arranged in a gentle semi-oval curve, which is answered by the counter-curve of the balustrade over the portal. The sense of ordered informality implied by these features was well suited to the emerging tastes of Baroque gentility, and the theme was taken up by architects across Europe during the next century and a half.

In the years 1642–1648 Richini built the nucleus of the Palazzo Litta for Count Bartolomeo Arese, a member of the Arese family, one of the most influential Milanese families of the period, who became President of the Senate of Milan in 1660. Richini’s later palaces – the Palazzo Annoni (1631), the Palazzo Durini (1645–8) and the Palazzo Brera (1651–86; now the Accademia di Belle Arti di Brera), all in Milan and all of which have survived virtually intact – were less innovative, for the most part paying homage to existing traditions of Milanese palace architecture. The Palazzo Brera includes one of the finest Lombard Baroque courtyards, surrounded by superimposed arcades on doubled columns that paraphrase the quotations from the Venetian Renaissance included in the works of Galeazzo Alessi and Pellegrino Tibaldi. The palace, originally the convent of the Humiliati di Santa Maria di Brera, was adapted according to plans commissioned from Richini by the Jesuits. The work was completed after Richini’s death by his son Giovanni Domenico Richini and his students Giuseppe Quadrio and Pietro Giorgio Rossone.

== Gallery ==
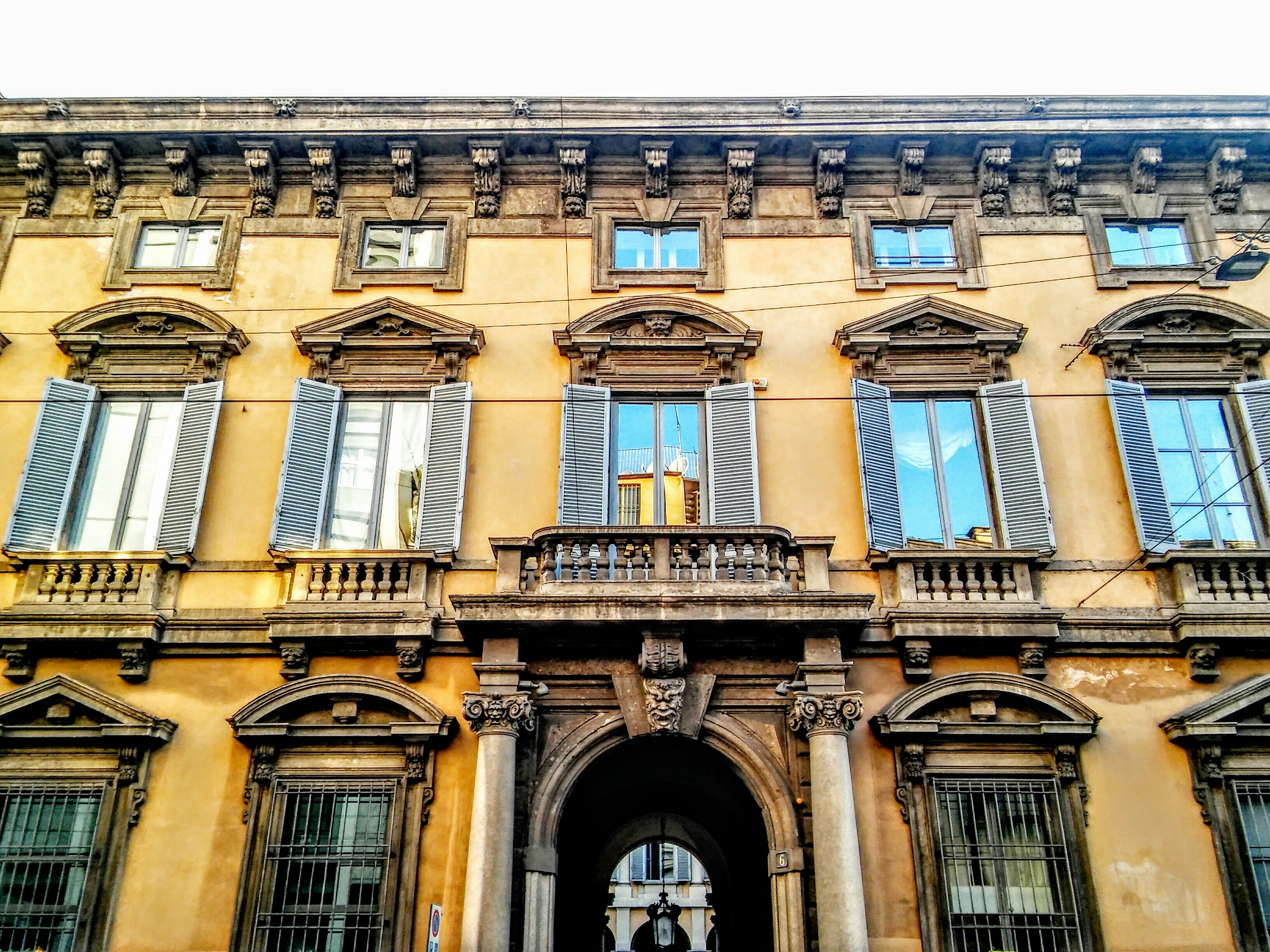
Façade of Palazzo Annoni, Milan

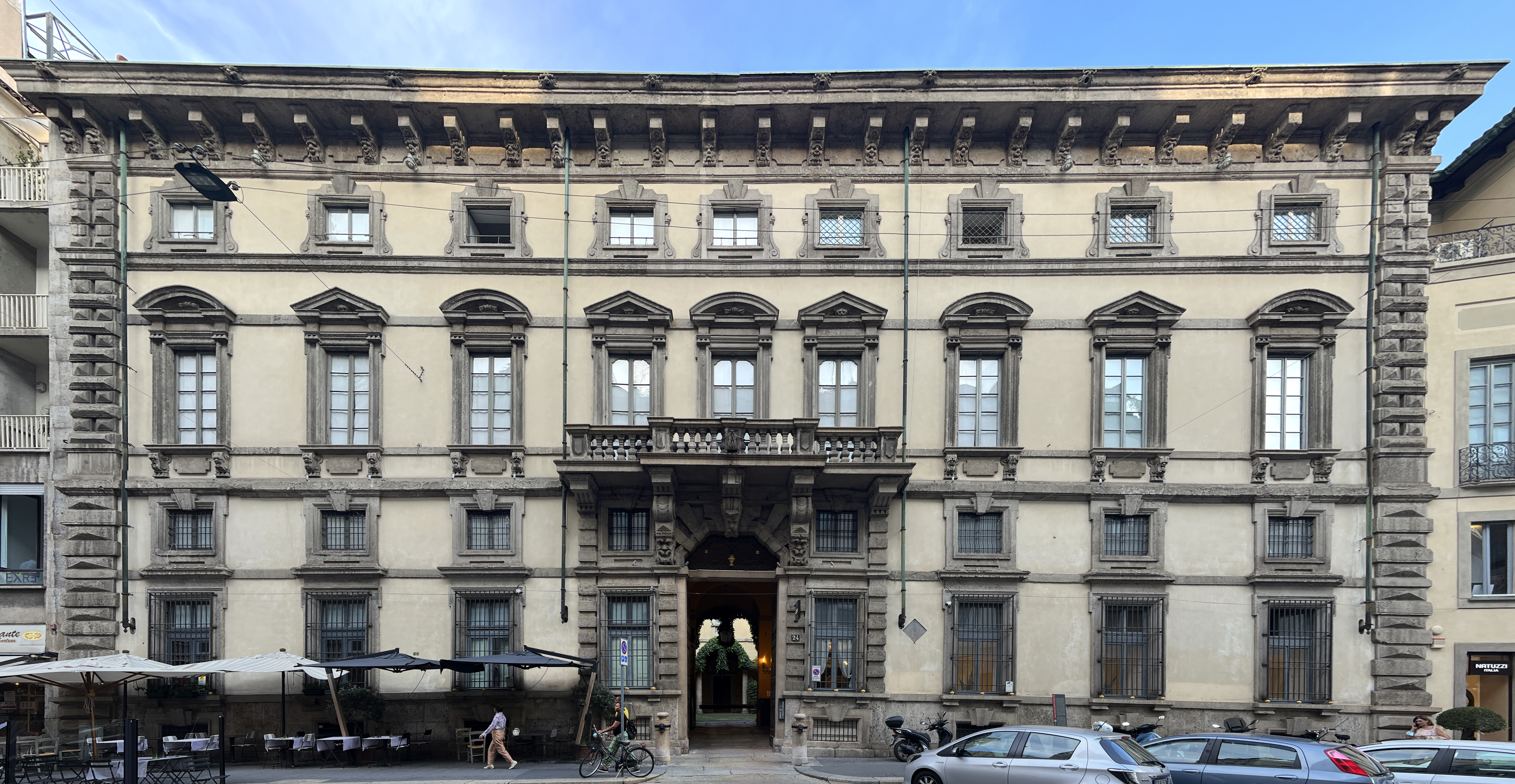
Palazzo Durini, Milan

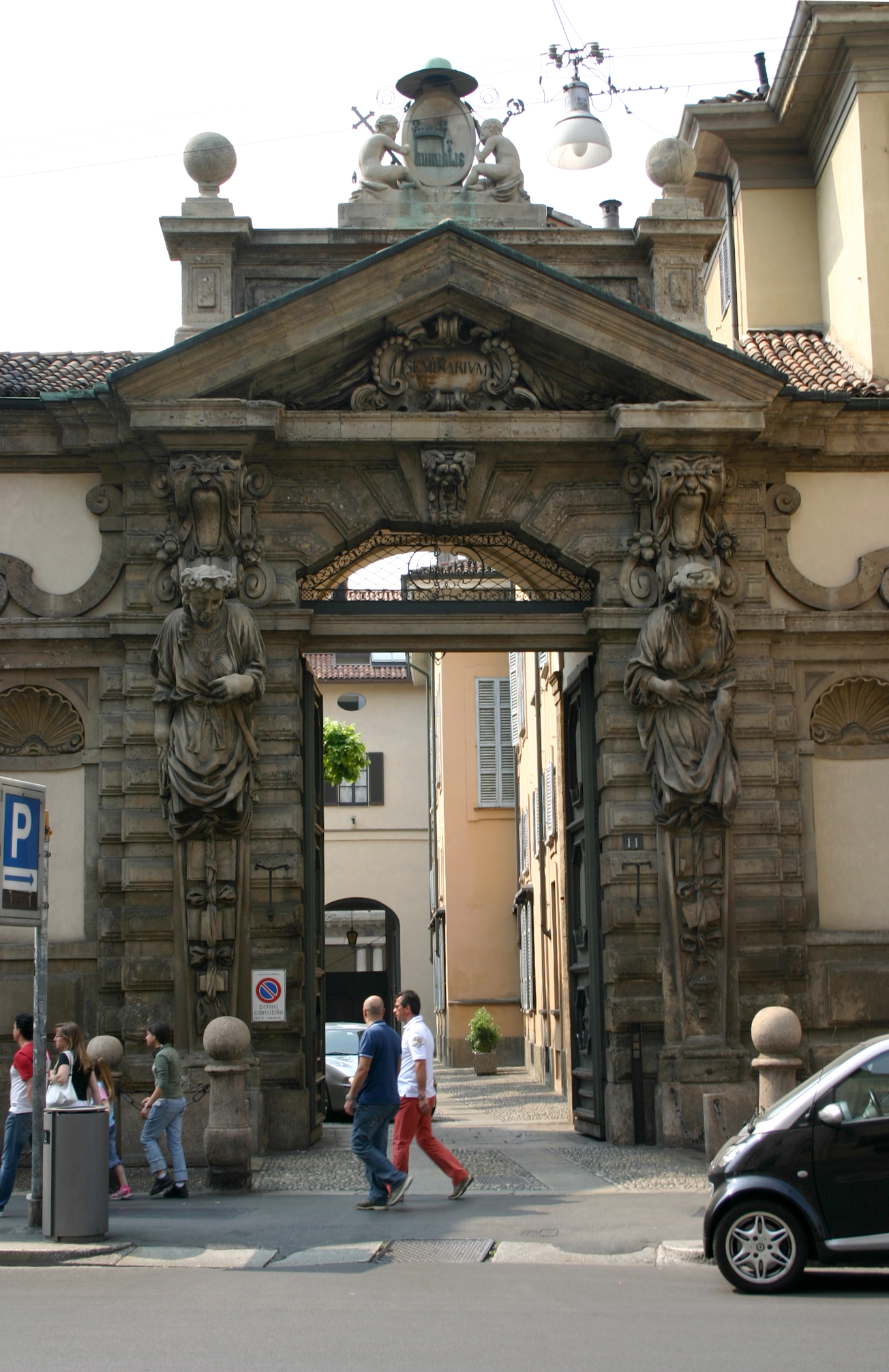
Main entrance of the Seminario arcivescovile, Milan

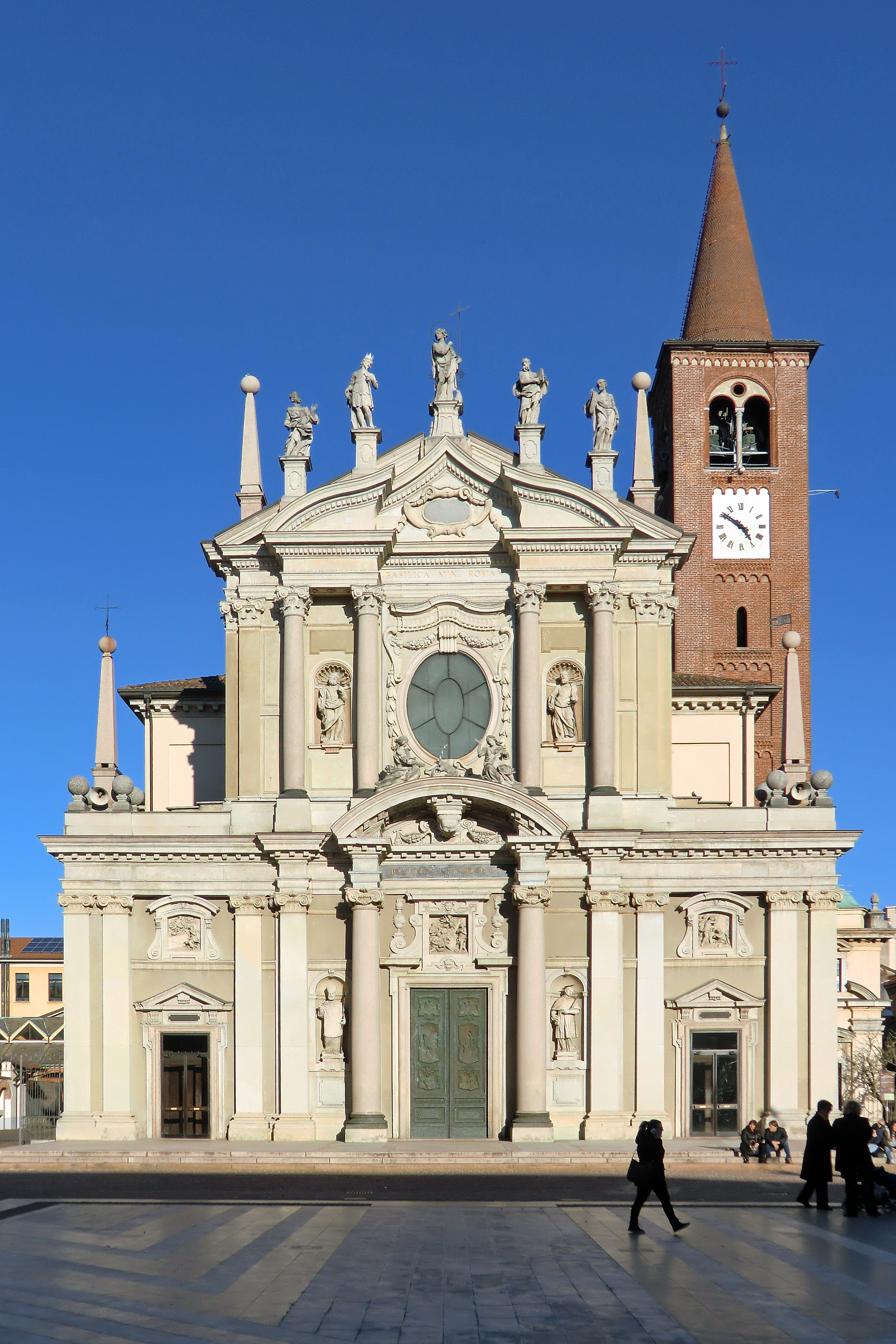
Façade of the Basilica of San Giovanni Battista, Busto Arsizio

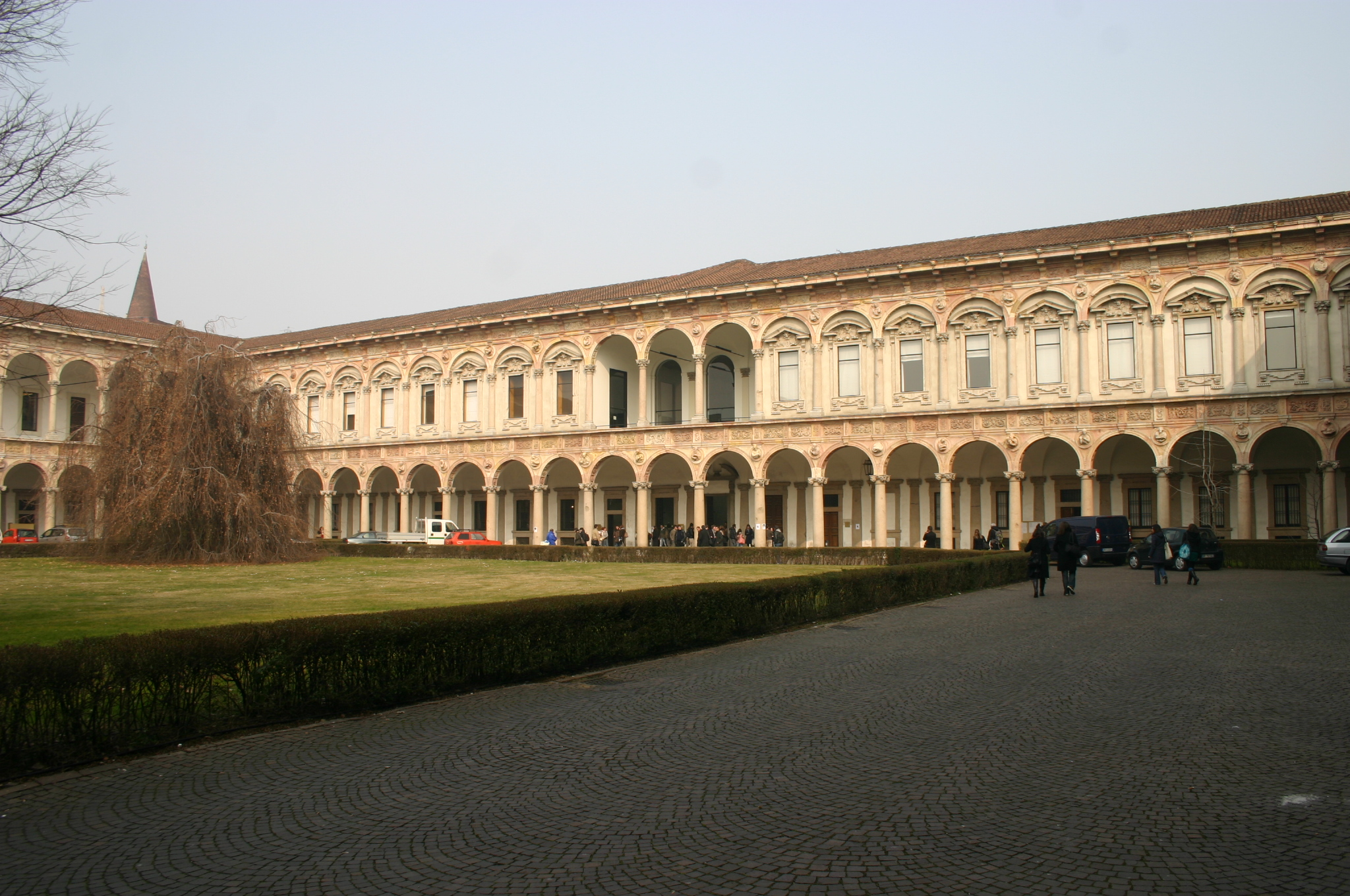
Courtyard of the Ospedale Maggiore, Milan

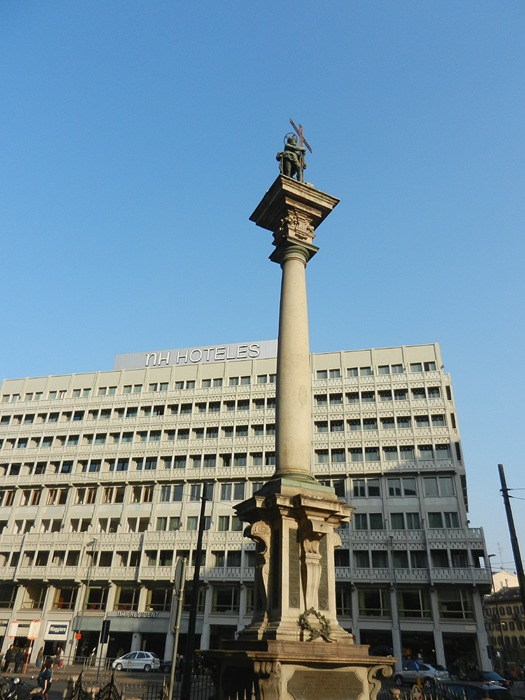
The Verziere Column

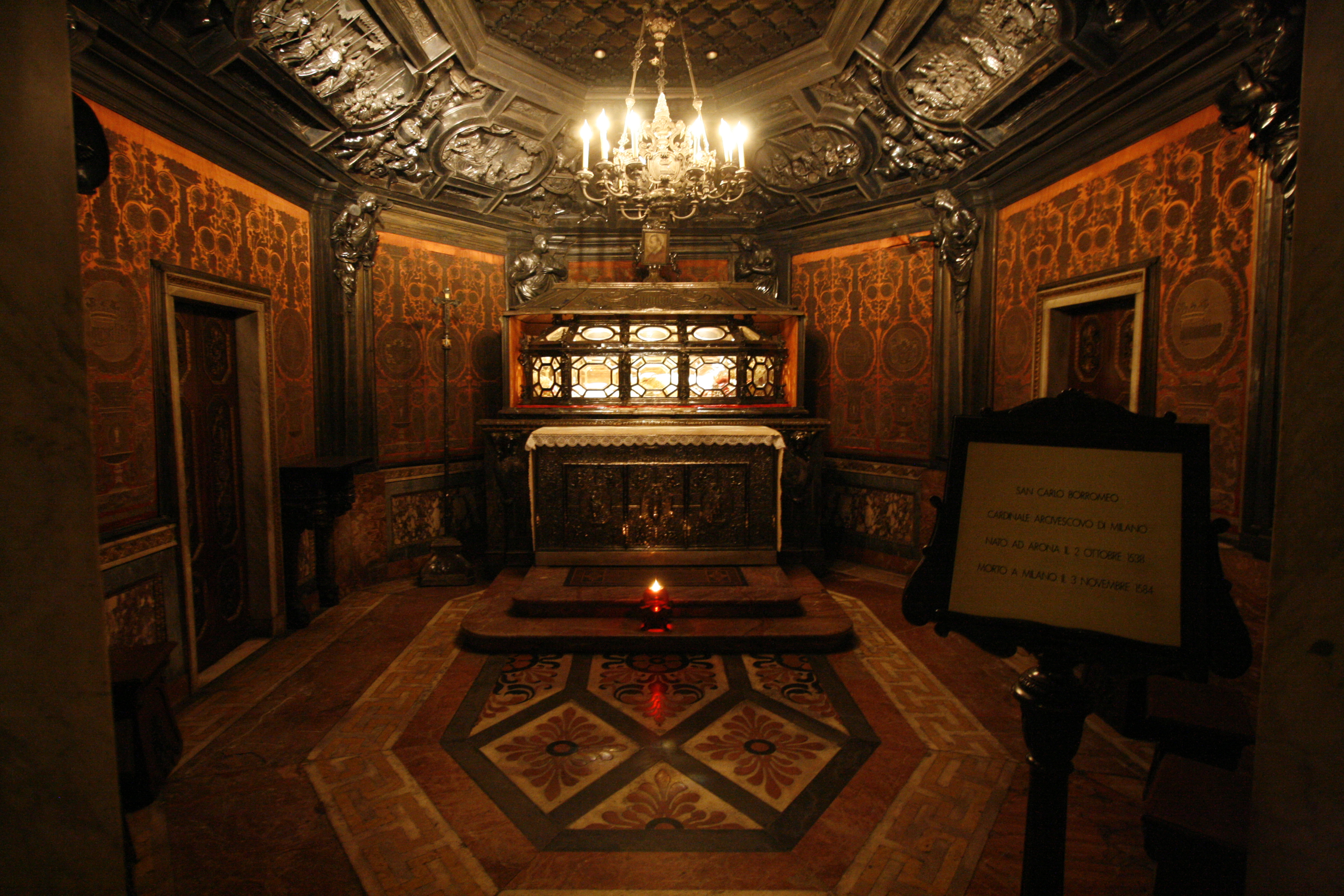
Crypt of St. Charles Borromeo, Milan Cathedral

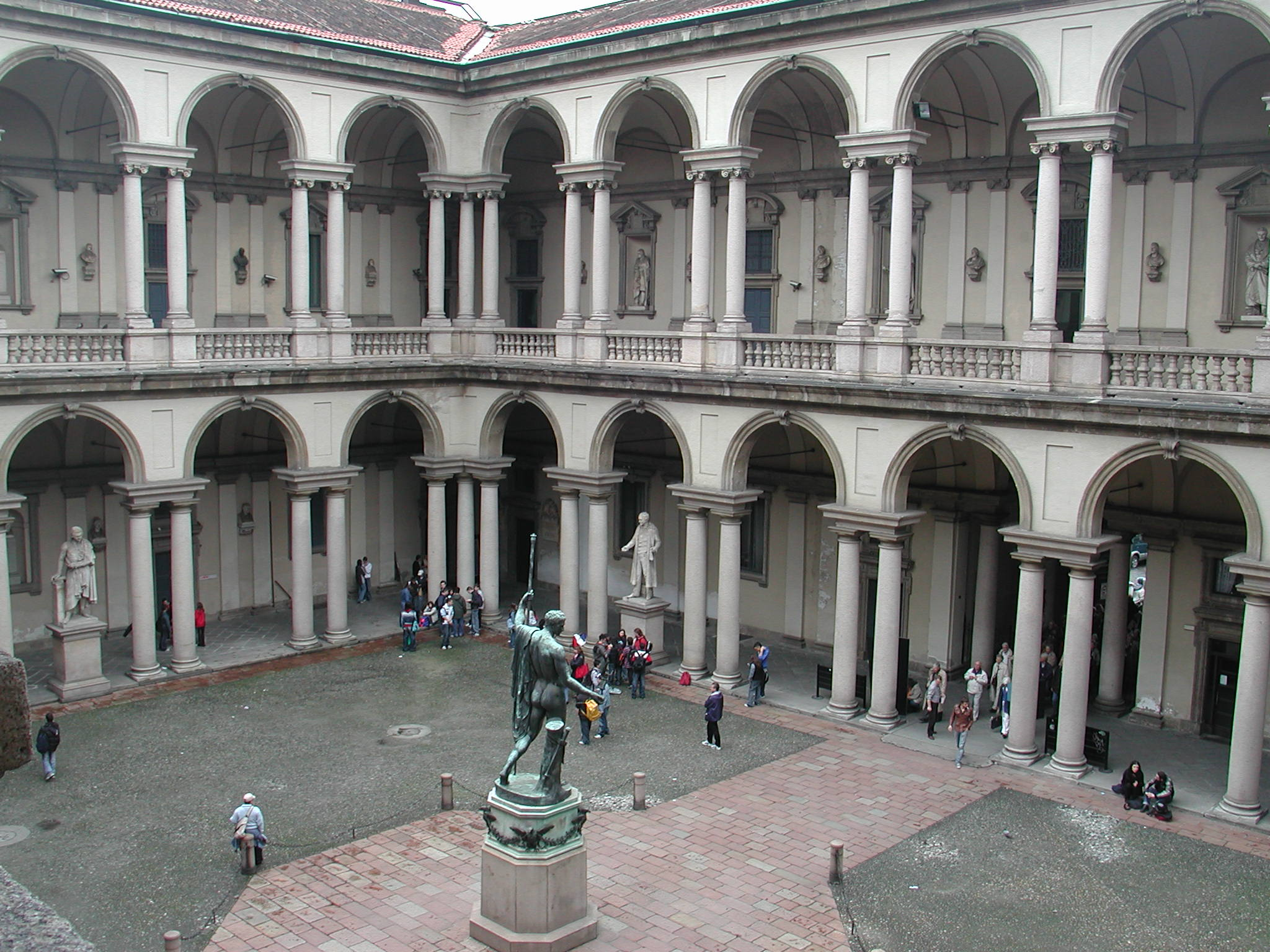
The inner court of Palazzo Brera in Milan
