= Sant'Alessandro in Zebedia =

Church in Milan, Italy

Coordinates: 45°27′39″N 9°11′13″E

Church of Saint Alexander of Bergamo in Zebedia (Church of Sant'Alessandro in Zebedia)
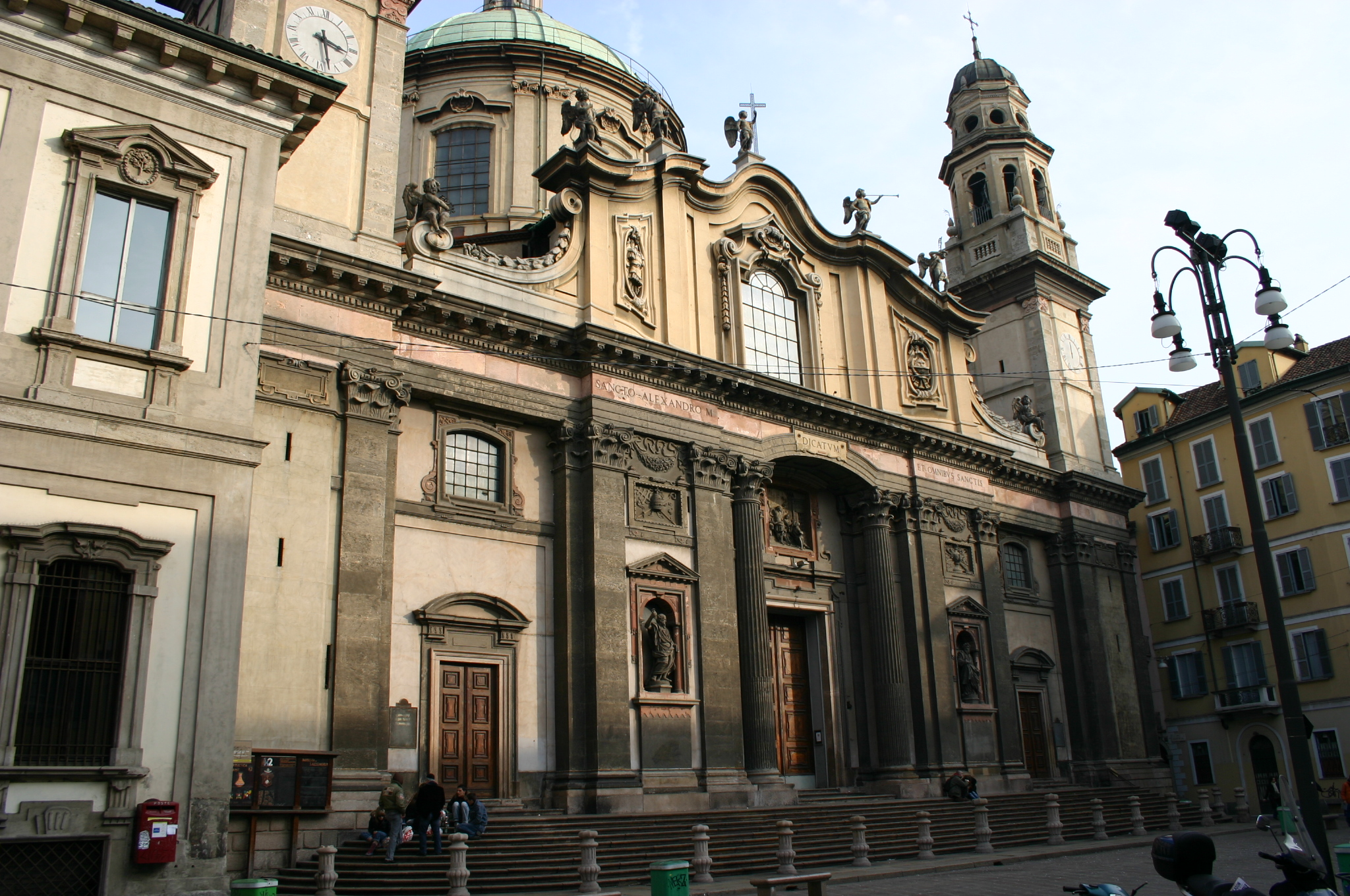
- Façade of the church.

Religion
- Affiliation: Roman Catholic
- Province: Milan
- Ecclesiastical or organisational status: National monument
- Status: Active

Location
- Location: Milan, Italy
- Interactive map of Church of Saint Alexander of Bergamo in Zebedia (Church of Sant'Alessandro in Zebedia)

Architecture
- Architects: Francesco Maria Richino; Lorenzo Binago
- Type: Church
- Style: Baroque
- Groundbreaking: 1601

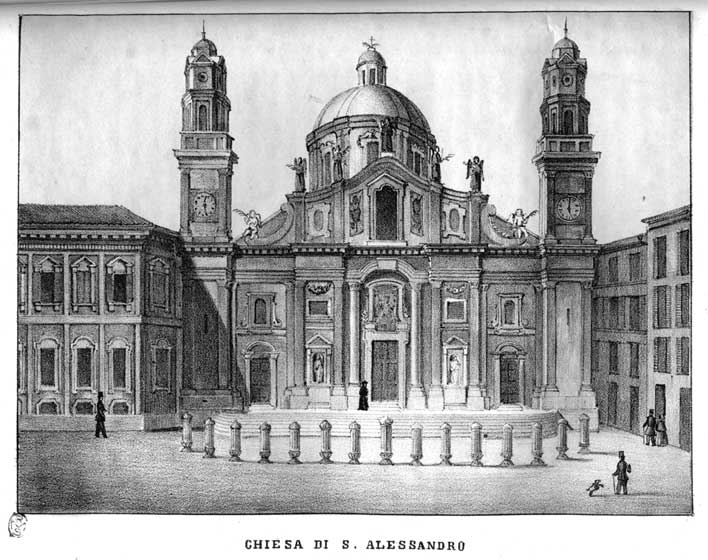
The church in a mid nineteenth-century print

Sant'Alessandro in Zebedia is a parish church in Milan, Italy. It is a distinctive example of the early Lombard Baroque.

== History ==
The original church was built in the 5th century, on the ruins of the Pretorium which tradition holds was the prison that held the martyred Sant'Alessandro. The name in Zebedia derives from the name of the prison in which the martyr was imprisoned.

Its construction for the Barnabite order began in 1601 to a design by Lorenzo Binago. Francesco Maria Richini also contributed to the project. The first church of Sant Alessandro was demolished, along with the nearby San Pancrazio. The first stone of the church was laid on 30 March 1602 by Cardinal Federico Borromeo.

It comprises a principal building on the Greek cross plan with a central dome, and a separate presbytery which also has a dome. By early 1627, the center dome had developed deep cracks and was demolished. Architect Fabio Mangone was brought in as a consultant. Richini redesigned the dome, and carried out Mangone's recommendations.

The façade, with decorations in bas-relief, has two campaniles.

The interior includes works by important artists including Camillo Procaccini (an Assumption, a Nativity and a Crucifixion) and Daniele Crespi (a Flagellation). There is also an altarpiece in the first chapel on the right by Ossana.

== See also ==
- 17th-century Western domes
