= San Giuseppe, Milan =

Church in Milan, Italy

Coordinates: 45°28′06″N 9°11′20″E

Church of Saint Joseph (Chiesa di San Giuseppe)
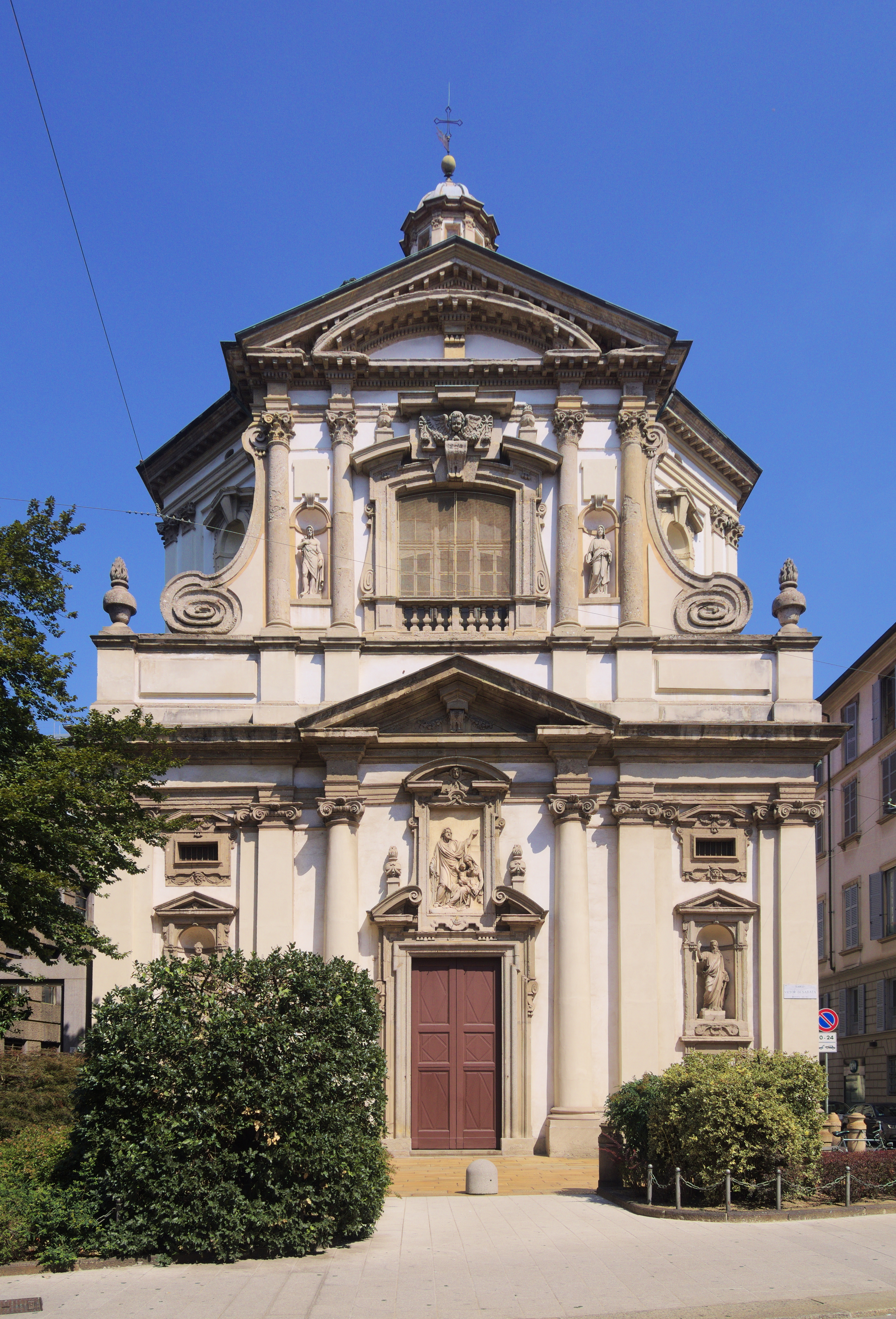
- Façade of the church.

Religion
- Affiliation: Roman Catholic
- Province: Milan
- Status: Active

Location
- Location: Milan, Italy
- Interactive map of Church of Saint Joseph (Chiesa di San Giuseppe)

Architecture
- Architect: Francesco Maria Richini
- Type: Church
- Style: Baroque
- Groundbreaking: 1607
- Completed: 1630

San Giuseppe is a Baroque-style Roman Catholic church in Milan, region of Lombardy, Italy.

Construction was begun in 1607 and completed in 1630. The architect was Francesco Maria Richini. The right side of the church overlooks Via Andegari, after a family with this name. It seems that the title of the street comes from the name of a family known as the "Andegardi" or "undegardi".

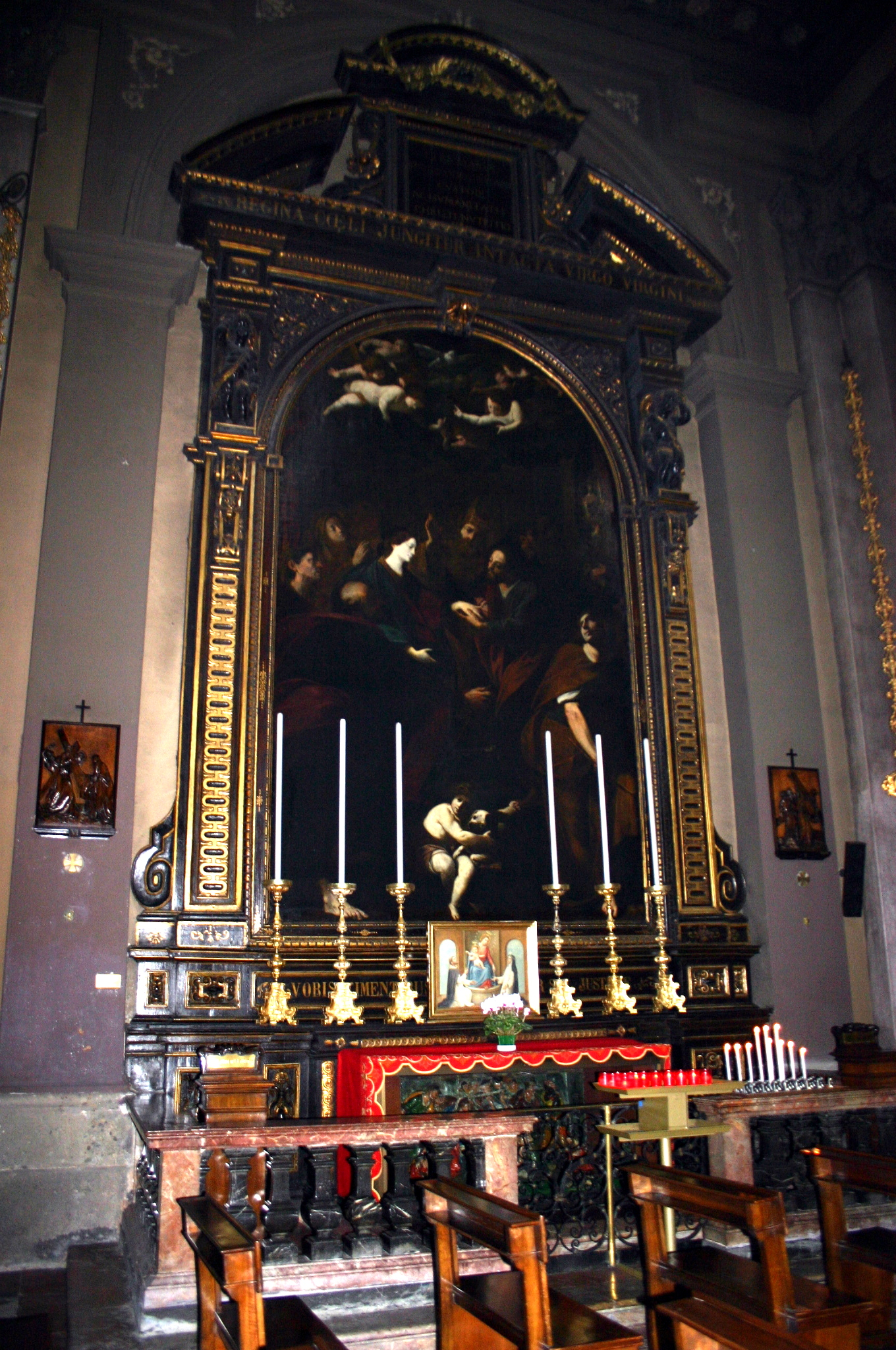
Marriage of St Joseph and the Virgin Mary

The interior contains large altarpieces depicting the Marriage of St Joseph and the Virgin Mary by Melchiorre Gherardini; the Death of St Joseph by Giulio Cesare Procaccini; a Holy Family by Andrea Lanzani; and a St John the Baptist by Stefano Montalti.
