= List of Milanese painters =

This is a list of painters from the Italian city of Milan.

== A–M ==
- Filippo Abbiati (1640–1715)
- Agostino Aglio (1777–1857)
- Andrea-Salvatore Aglio (1736–1786)
- Federico Agnelli (1626–1702)
- Giovanni Agucchi (1570–1632)
- Giuseppe Amisani (1881–1941)
- Giuseppe Appiani (1740–1812)
- Carlo Bacchiocco
- Bartolomeo di Cassino (late 16th century)
- Giovanni Bellati (1745–1808)
- Ambrogio Bergognone (1452–1522)
- Cesare Bernazano (1504–15??)
- Giuseppe Bertini (1825–1898)
- Ambrogio Besozzi (1648–1706)
- Federico Bianchi (1635–1719)
- Isidoro Bianchi (1581–1662)
- Carlo Biffi (1605–1675)
- Francesco Biondo (1735–1805)
- Leonardo di Bisuccio (15th century)
- Giovanni Antonio Boltraffio (1466–1515)
- Giovanni Battista Bonacina (1620–1664)
- Benigno Bossi (1727–1800)
- Zanetto Bugatto (1439–1475)
- Guglielmo Caccia (1568–1625)
- Margherita Caffi (1650–1710)
- Antonio Caimi (1811–1878)
- Francesco Cairo (1607–1665)
- Carlo Cane (1618–1688)
- Caravaggio (1571–1610)
- Giovanni Battista Cerva (1514–1580)
- Carlo Cornara (1605–1673)
- Daniele Crespi (1598–1630)
- Giovanni Battista Crespi (1573–1632)
- Giovanni Stefano Danedi (1612–1690)
- Giovanni Battista Discepoli (1590–1654)
- Gaudenzio Ferrari (1474–1546)
- Giovanni Ambrogio Figino (1552–1608)
- Giovanni Ghisolfi (1623–1683)
- Gerolamo Giovenone (1489–1554)
- Domenico Induno (1815–1878)
- Paolo Landriani (1757–1839)
- Paolo Camillo Landriani (1559–1618)
- Bernardino Lanini (1511–1583)
- Andrea Lanzani (1641–1712)
- Stefano Maria Legnani (1660–1715)
- Giuseppe Levati (1739–1828)
- Vittoria Ligari (1713–1783)
- Gian Paolo Lomazzo (1538–1592)
- Emilio Longoni (1859–1932)
- Aurelio Luini (1529–1593)
- Bernardino Luini (1474–1532)
- Cesare Magni (1494–1533)
- Marco d'Oggiono (1469–1539)
- Pier Francesco Mazzucchelli (1573–1626)
- Giuseppe Meda (1533–1599)

== N–Z ==
- Carlo Francesco Nuvolone (c. 1609 – c. 1662)
- Panfilo Nuvolone (1580–1651)
- Cesare Poggi (1803–1859)
- Ferdinando Porta (1687–1763)
- Giovanni Battista Pozzi (1662–1730)
- Ranunzio Prata
- Constantino Prinetti (1830–1855)
- Ercole Procaccini the Younger (1605–1675)
- Ercole Procaccini the Elder (1519–1595)
- Camillo Procaccini (1561–1629)
- Carlo Antonio Procaccini (1554–1630)
- Giulio Cesare Procaccini (1573–1625)
- Bernardo Racchetti (1639–1702)
- Luigi Riccardi (1808–1877)
- Andrea Solari (1459–1523)
- Jacopo Tunicelli (1784–1825)
- Agustino Da Vaprio (15th century)
- Constantino Vaprio (active 1453–1482)
- Tanzio da Varallo (1575–1633)
- Francesco Vico (17th century)

== See also ==
- List of Italian painters
- List of Milanese people
