= Appiani =

Appiani is an Italian surname. Among people with this name are:

- Members of the noble Appiani family, which flourished from the 13th to the 17th centuries, and were lords or princes of Piombino. Their biographies are summarized in the family article.
- Andrea Appiani "the elder" (1754–1817), neoclassical painter
- Andrea Appiani "the younger" (1817–1865), historical painter, great-nephew of the above
- Francesco Appiani (1704–1792), Italian painter
- Galleazzo Appiani (fl. 1592), Italian architect who worked in Poland
- Giacomo Vittorio Appiani (died 1482), Italian bishop
- Giuseppe Appiani (1740–1812), Italian painter
- Joseph Ignaz Appiani (1706–1785), German painter of the late Baroque
- Niccolò Appiani Appiano (fl. 1510), Milanese painter
- Silvio Appiani (1894–1915), Italian footballer
