= Biondo =

Biondo is an Italian surname. Notable people with the surname include:

- Cayetano Biondo (1902–1986), Argentine actor
- Flavio Biondo (1392–1463), Italian historian
- Francesco Biondo (1735–1805), Italian painter
- George Biondo (born 1954), American bass guitarist
- Giovanni del Biondo (14th century), Italian painter
- Joseph Biondo (1897–1973), member of the Gambino crime family
- Maurizio Biondo (born 1981), Italian cyclist
- Ron Biondo (born 1981), short track speed skater
- Santa Biondo (1892–1989), American opera singer
