= Vaprio =

Vaprio may refer to:

People:

- Agustino Da Vaprio, Italian Renaissance painter
- Constantino Vaprio, Italian Renaissance painter
- Paola Vaprio (born 1986), Panamanian beauty pageant winner

Places:

- Vaprio d'Adda, province of Milan, Lombardy, Italy
- Vaprio d'Agogna, province of Novara, Piedmont, Italy
- Casaletto Vaprio, province of Cremona, Lombardy, Italy
