= Lanzano =

Lanzano is an Italian surname. Notable people with the surname include:

- Agostino da Lanzano (died 1410), Roman Catholic bishop
- Andrea Lanzano (1651–1709), Italian Baroque painter
- Mattia Lanzano (born 1990), Italian footballer
