= Pharming party =

Exchange of prescription drugs for recreational use

Pharming parties is a term describing alleged get-togethers where prescription drugs are exchanged and randomly ingested, in order to become intoxicated. The earliest mention of the term appears to have been in the March 8, 2002 issue of the newspaper Public Opinion (Chambersburg, PA), which said this was occurring "in some communities". The pharm party story has since spread to periodicals and television stations throughout the United States, including reputable, mainstream sources such as Time and The Washington Post.

== Origins ==
Practices similar to the pharm party phenomenon have been described in media as far back as the 1960s. An event called a "fruit salad party" was first described in the March 30, 1966 edition of The Sun in Lowell, Massachusetts. The story claimed that several teenagers each brought three pills to a party in Medford, Massachusetts and that, after mixing the pills together in a bowl and selecting three at random, most of the group had to be hospitalized and one remained in a coma. The article did not provide the names of any of the teenagers and said only that the incident occurred "several months ago."

"Fruit salad parties" were subsequently described in the Tucson Daily Citizen in 1969 and the American School Board Journal. The source for both articles was a registered nurse who had no practical experience with these parties but had reportedly heard about them from drug lecturers, law enforcement officials and prosecutors "throughout the United States." Reports on fruit salad parties continued into the early 1970s, appearing in the Charleston Daily Mail, Ohio's Coshocton Tribune, the Billings Gazette and Hayward, California's Daily Review, before ultimately petering out. The Daily Mail took a more literal approach to the rumors, describing the pills as being hidden inside fruit which students mixed into actual fruit salads.

== Modern reports ==
In the first decade of the 21st century, news outlets began picking up the story anew, this time referring to them as "pharm parties" or "pharming parties." As with the earlier spate of reports, sources of information were indirect, statistics were absent or misleading, and no specific incidents could be identified. Nonetheless, in 2005 and 2006, articles were written on the subject in South Florida's Sun-Sentinel, the Toronto Star, USA Today and the Washington Post, and episodes of the television series CSI: NY and Boston Legal were centered around it. In 2007, the Baltimore Jewish Times even ran an article on "fruit salad parties."

In June 2006, Slate editor Jack Shafer investigated reports of "pharming parties" and concluded that there was little evidence that such a phenomenon was popular, growing, or even real. Shafer wrote, "If pharm parties are a trend, they're the best-hidden and least-talked about one in the country." He noted that "It goes without saying that pharm parties may be very real and very everywhere. It's a big country. But it looks to me like pharm party is just a new label the drug-abuse industrial complex has adopted to describe the decades-old tradition of pill parties."

Although studies show that as many as one in five teenagers have abused prescription medications, it is not clear whether parties specifically organized to exchange drugs contribute to this abuse. In March 2008, Shafer wrote, "I've failed to locate a single human source or article that documents a single such festivity, let alone proves that they're commonplace, as the media would have you believe." As of September 2010, Shafer has written eight columns for Slate discussing and debunking pharm parties.

== See also ==
- Cautionary tale
- Moral panic
- Urban legends about drugs
