= Luigi Pellegrini Scaramuccia =

Italian painter

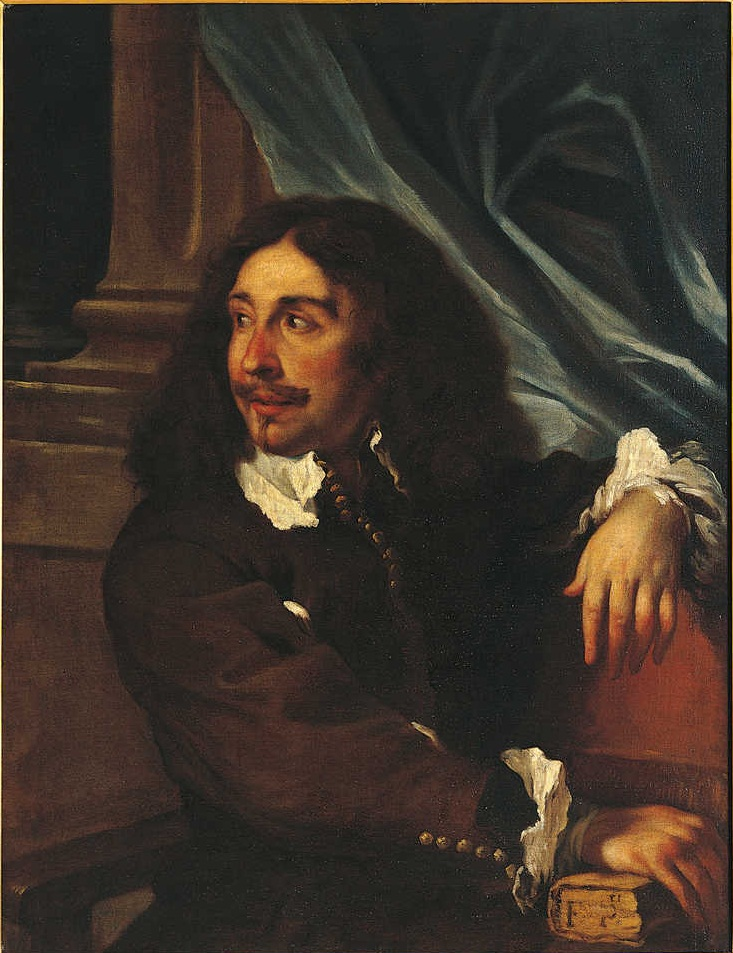
- Portrait of Luigi Scaramuccia by Francesco Cairo, c. 1657, Milan, Pinacoteca di Brera
- Born: 1621; Perugia, Papal States
- Died: 3 August 1680 (aged 58–59); Milan, Duchy of Milan
- Known for: Painting
- Movement: Baroque

Luigi Pellegrini Scaramuccia (1621 – 3 August 1680) was an Italian painter and artist biographer of the Baroque period. A pupil, along with Giovanni Domenico Cerrini of the painter Guido Reni, he is best known for his book Le finezze de' pennelli italiani, one of the earliest compilations of biographies that included baroque artists from Bologna and Milan.

== Biography ==
Born in Perugia to the painter Giovanni Antonio Scaramuccia, he studied first with his father, and then in Rome with Guido Reni. He was a widely travelled and cultivated artist, who from 1654 worked primarily in Milan, where he played an important role in the refounding of the Accademia Ambrosiana. His painted works include the Crucifixion of St. Peter (San Vittore al Corpo, Milan) and Federico Borromeo Visiting the Plague-stricken (Milan, Pinacoteca Ambrosiana). The latter work was part of a large project promoted by Antonio Busca to decorate the Accademia Ambrosiana with works honoring the founder, Federico Borromeo. The works recall the large Quadroni of St. Charles painted about the life of Carlo Borromeo for the Duomo of Milan. Other painters in this project were Ambrogio Besozzi, Cesare Fiore, Andrea Lanzani, and Antonio Busca himself. The Brera Gallery has a portrait of Scaramucci painted by his friend, Francesco Cairo. One of his pupils was Andrea Lanzano of San Colombano.

Scaramuccia worked also under Carlo Cignani and alongside Lorenzo Pasinelli, Girolamo Bonini, and Giovanni Maria Galli-Bibiena, in the fresco decoration of the Sala Farnese in the Palazzo d'Accursio (now City Hall) in Bologna.

His fame rests on his book Le finezze dei pennelli italiani ammirate e studiate da Girupeno sotto la scorta e la disciplina del genio di Raffaello d’Urbino, published in Padua in 1674, but essentially completed by 1666, in which year it was submitted to the Accademia di San Luca in Rome. It takes the form of an artistic journey undertaken by a young man called Girupeno (an anagram of Perugino) under the guidance of Raphael. The journey starts and ends in Rome, after taking in Bologna, Naples, Venice, Milan, Genoa, Turin, Parma and Modena. This structure differs from that of previous treatises on art, which had taken a biographical rather than a topographical approach to their subject, and allows the author to describe the works of art found in the various cities, to discuss the major artists and to state his own theories.

The work's last section, containing principles or reminders for young people starting out on a career as artists, reveals a decidedly classicist attitude. This is followed by an extract from the Trattato della pittura by Leonardo, which had been published in Paris by Raphaël Trichet du Fresne in 1651. Scaramuccia made only a few additions to the bibliography of books on art that du Fresne had compiled as an introduction to Leonardo's treatise.

Scaramuccia died in Milan in 1680. The Brera Gallery has a portrait of Scaramuccia painted by his friend, Francesco Cairo. One of his pupils was Andrea Lanzano of San Colombano.

== Writings ==
- Le finezze dei pennelli italiani ammirate e studiate dal Girupeno sotto la scorta e la disciplina del genio di Raffaello d’Urbino. Padua: Gio. Andrea Magri. 1674.

== Gallery ==
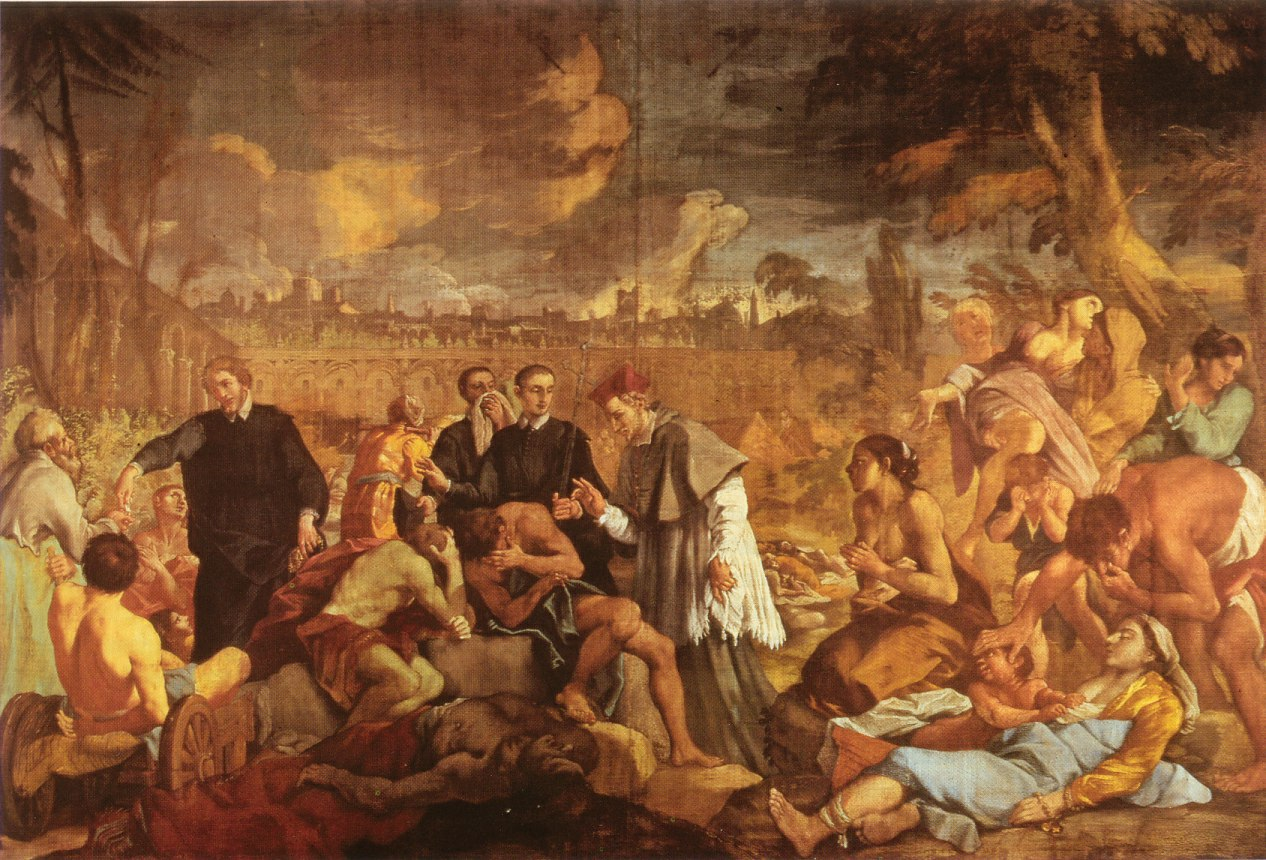
Federico Borromeo visits the leper house during the Plague of 1630, Milan, Biblioteca Ambrosiana

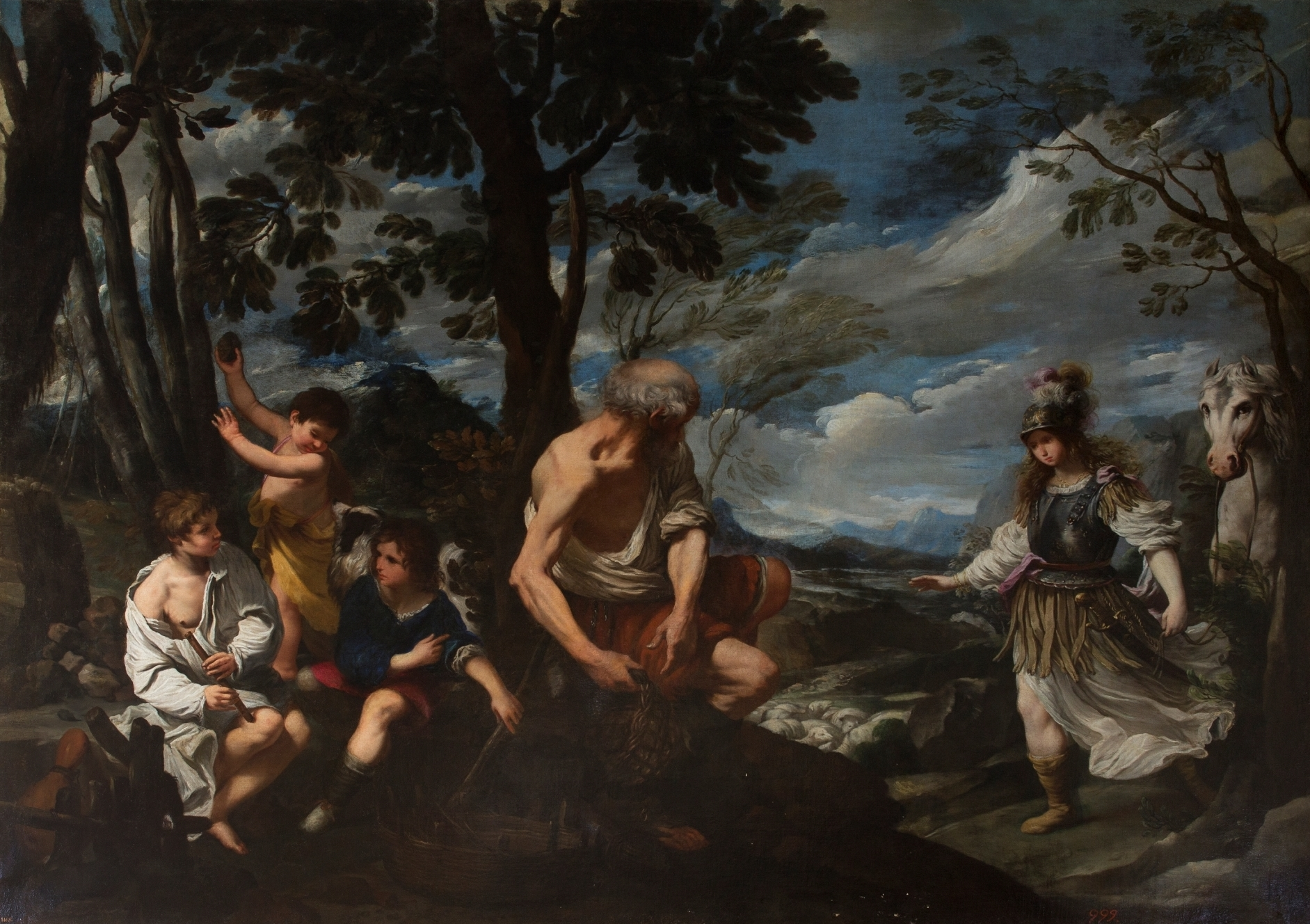
Erminia arrives into the shepherds hut, Museo del Prado, Madrid

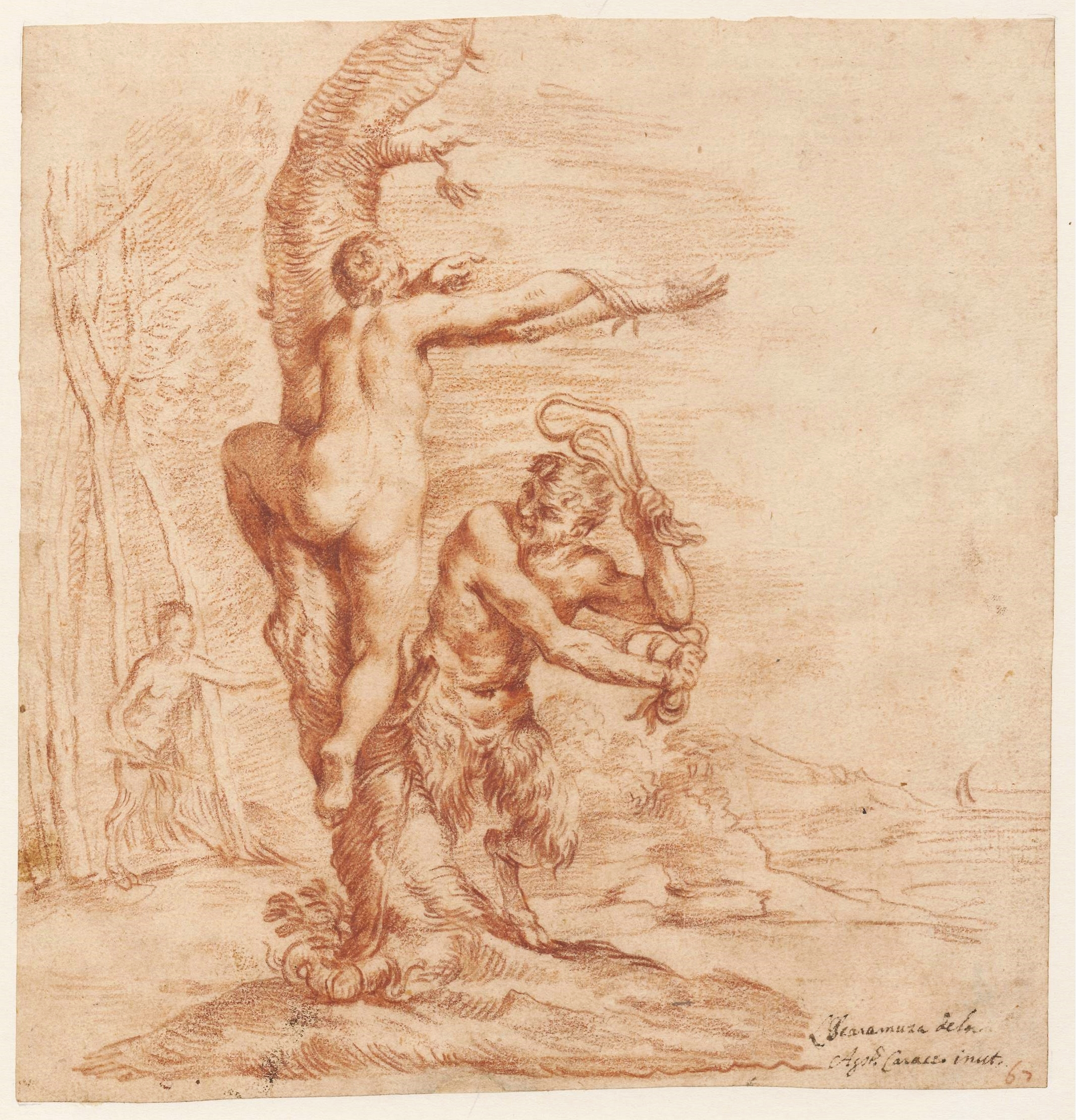
Satyr whipping a nymph, National Museum in Warsaw

Presentation of Jesus at the Temple, 1665-1669, Convent of San Domenico, Perugia
