= Agucchi =

Agucchi is a surname. Notable people with the surname include:

- Giovanni Agucchi, 16th-century Italian engraver
- Giovanni Battista Agucchi (1570–1632), Italian churchman, Papal diplomat, and writer on art theory
- Girolamo Agucchi (1555–1605), Italian Roman Catholic cardinal
