= Poggi =

Poggi is an Italian surname, derived from the word poggio, meaning knoll. Notable people with the surname include:

- Amelio Poggi (1914–1974), Italian bishop and diplomat
- Ansaldo Poggi, Italian luthier
- Antonio Poggi, Italian tenor
- Biff Poggi, American football coach
- Cesare Poggi, Italian painter
- Chiara Poggi (1981–2007), Italian murder victim
- Claudio Poggi, Argentine politician
- Christine Poggi, American art historian
- Daniela Poggi, Italian actress
- Dario Poggi, Italian bobsledder
- Enrico Poggi, Italian sailor
- Fabrizio Poggi (born 1958), singer and harmonica player
- Federico Poggi, Argentine footballer
- Ferdinando Poggi, Italian actor
- Giacomo Poggi (born 1960), Italian retired racewalker
- Gianni Poggi, Italian tenor
- Giorgio Poggi, Italian sailor
- Giovanni Poggi (historian) (1880–1961), Italian historian and curator
- Giuseppe Poggi, Italian architect
- Louis Poggi (footballer), French footballer
- Luigi Poggi, Italian cardinal
- Luigi Poggi (sailor), Italian sailor
- Marcos Poggi (born 1987), Spanish rugby player
- Mario Poggi, Peruvian psychologist
- Matteo Poggi, Italian footballer
- Paolo Poggi, Italian footballer
- Vicente Poggi (born 2002), Uruguayan footballer

== See also ==
- Palazzo Poggi, a palace in Bologna, Italy
