= Antonio Busca (painter) =

Italian painter (1625–1686)

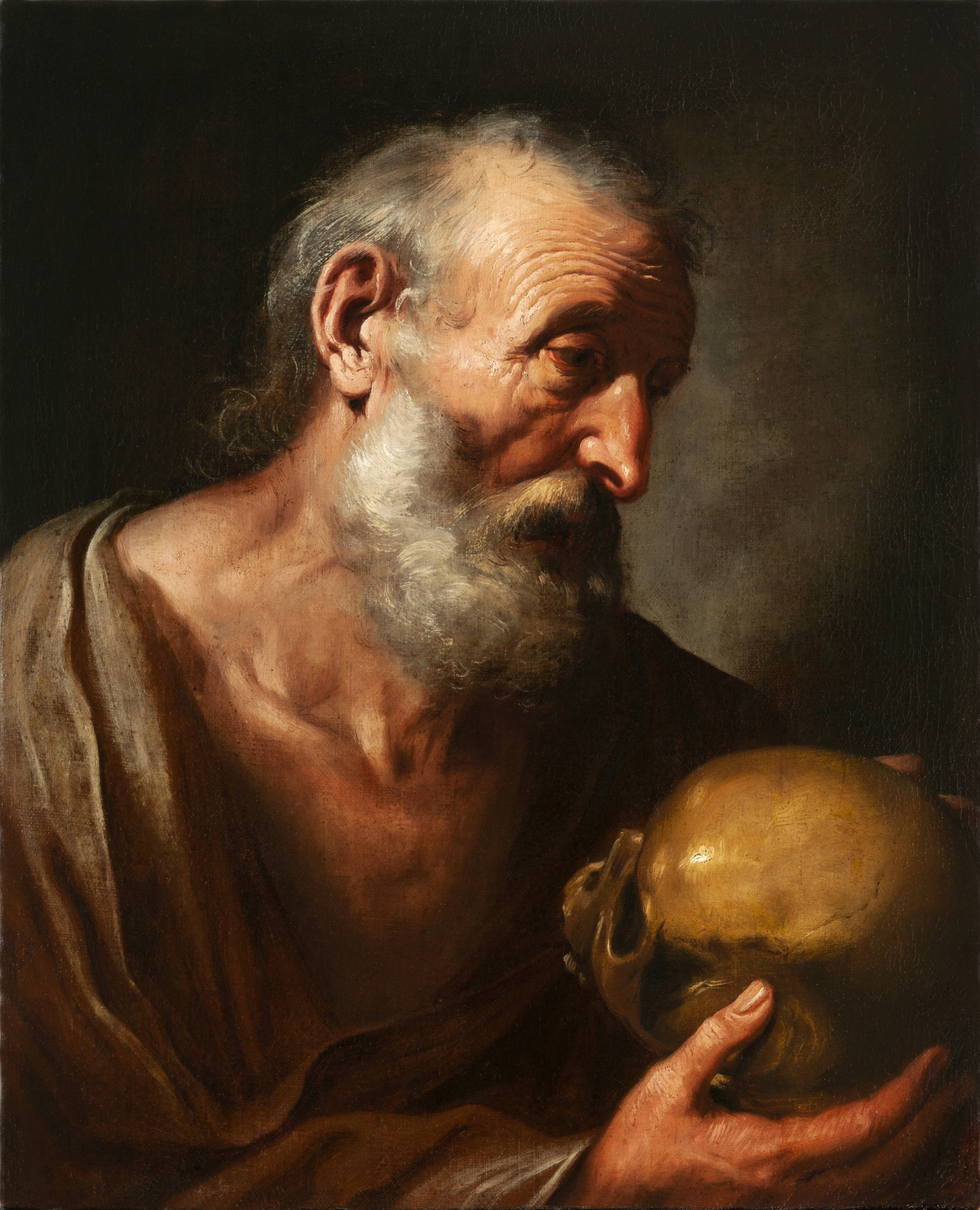
- Saint Jerome, priv. col.
- Born: 28 July 1625; Milan, Duchy of Milan
- Died: 23 December 1684 (aged 59); Milan, Duchy of Milan
- Education: Panfilo Nuvolone; Ercole Procaccini the Younger
- Known for: Painting
- Movement: Baroque

Antonio Busca (July 28, 1625 – December 23, 1684) was an Italian painter of the Baroque period, mainly active in Lombardy.

== Biography ==
Antonio Busca was born in Milan on July 28, 1625. He was trained by Panfilo Nuvolone and Ercole Procaccini the Younger and his Apparition of the Virgin to St. Felix (Orta San Giulio, San Nicolao) may date from the 1640s. During 1648–9, under Procaccini, Busca along with Johann Christoph Storer, il Moncalvo, and Luigi Pellegrini Scaramuccia helped decorate of the Chapel of the Crucifix in the church of San Marco in Milan. In 1650–51, accompanied by Giovanni Ghisolfi, with whom he frequently collaborated, Busca studied in Rome.

Some time before 1674 he painted two canvases for the Sala dei Senatori in the Palazzo Ducale, Milan: one of these, the Tribute Money (Milan, Pinacoteca di Brera), a strikingly classical work both in the figure style and in the grandiose architectural setting, survives. His career ended with the frescoes of St. Francis in Glory in chapel XX of the Sacro Monte di Orta. Busca died in Milan on December 23, 1684. Among his pupils were Filippo Abbiati, Andrea Lanzani and Giovanni Ambrogio Besozzi (1648–1706), but he was not popular with the succeeding generation and his teaching methods were resented as too dictatorial. There are collections of his drawings in the Ambrosiana, Milan, and in the Musei Civici, Milan.

== Gallery ==
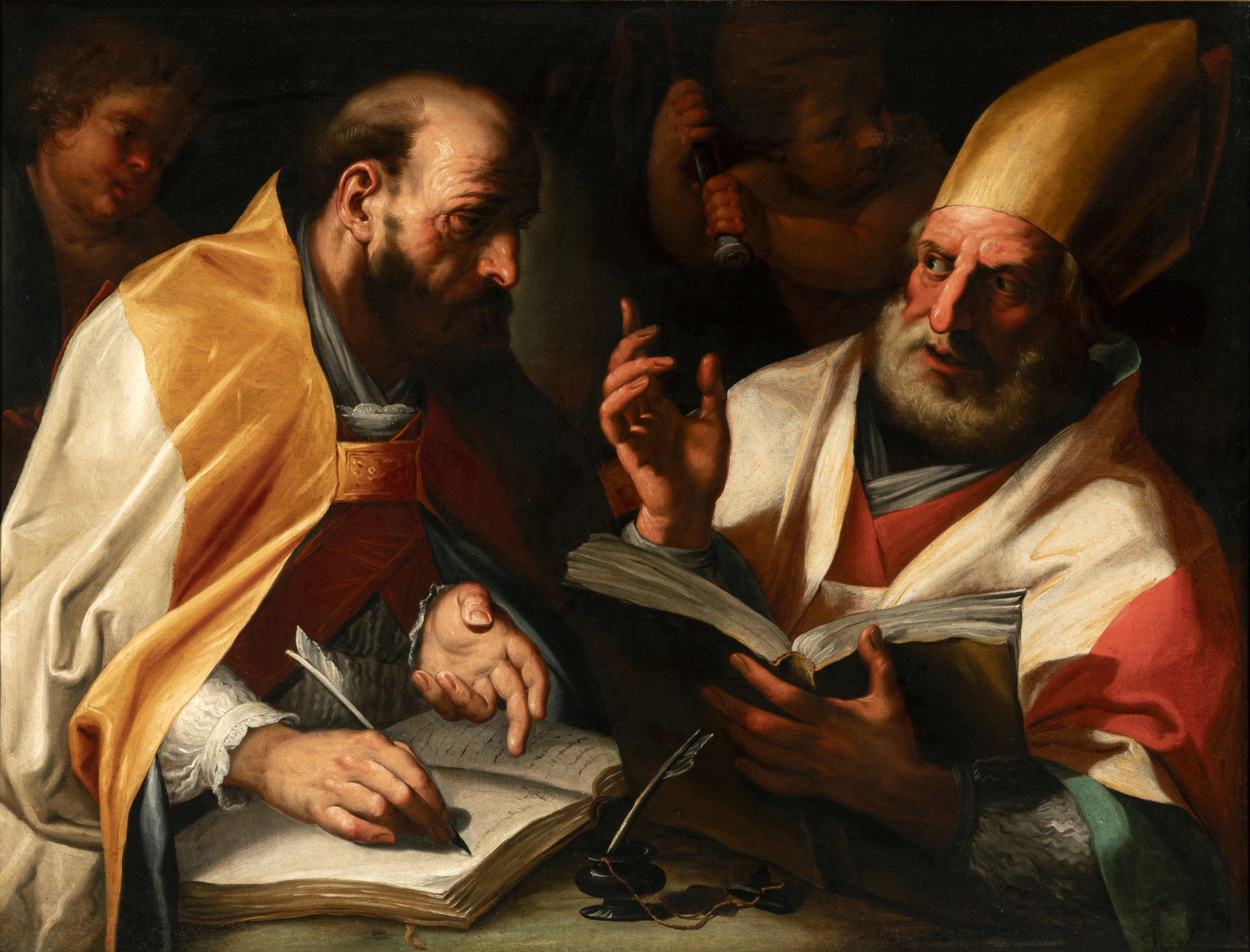
Saint Augustine and Saint Ambrose, priv. col.

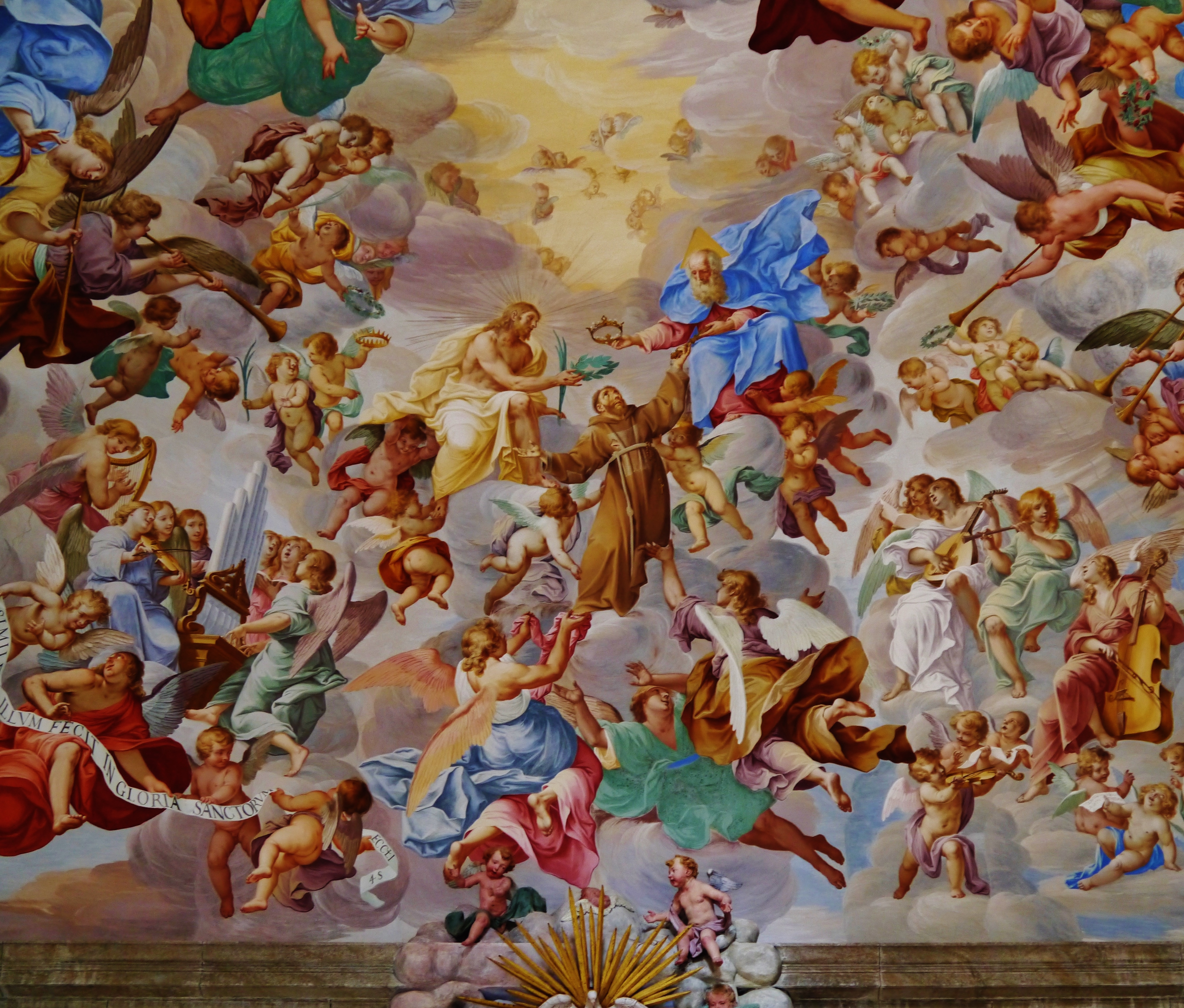
St. Francis in Glory, frosco in chapel XX of the Sacro Monte di Orta

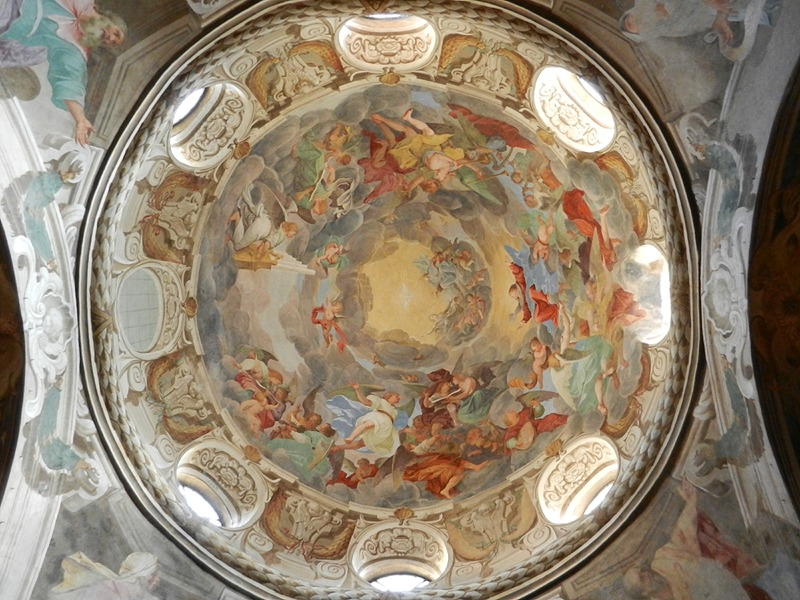
Assumption of Mary, Santuario della Madonnina in Prato, Varese
