= Paolo Bianchi =

Paolo Bianchi was an Italian engraver of the Baroque, chiefly employed in engraving portraits for the booksellers, active c. the year 1670. He engraved some of the portraits for Priorato's History of Leopold, among which are : Cardinal Flavio Chigi, nephew of Pope Alexander VII, and Luigi do Benevides Carillio.

== Life and work ==
He was born, according to A. Zanetti, in Milan around 1590 and here he worked as an engraver, draftsman and, perhaps, a painter. He was also cartographic engraver and editor "in the name of Balla"; active in 1617 and again in 1654.

Bianchi is registered in 1620 as engraver at the Academy of Fine Arts at the Ambrosiana in Milan. He then worked, almost exclusively, for the most famous Milanese printers and publishers, especially for GB Bidelli, Malatesta, Ponzio: his engravings were accurate and diligent, even if the incisor sign is often uncertain, lists twenty-four of them, drawn from drawings by Domenico Fiasella, Bernardo Castello, Andrea Lanzani, Domenico Piola, Frà Molina, GC Storer, A. Storm. He signed "Bianchi G. P. made", "Blanc.", "Blancus" "Io. Pau Blancus", etc., often followed by the indication "Mediolanensis" or "in Milan". The variety of his prints bear witness to the vast range of interests and relationships he had with the society of his time.
