= Giovanni Ghisolfi =

Italian painter (1623–1683)

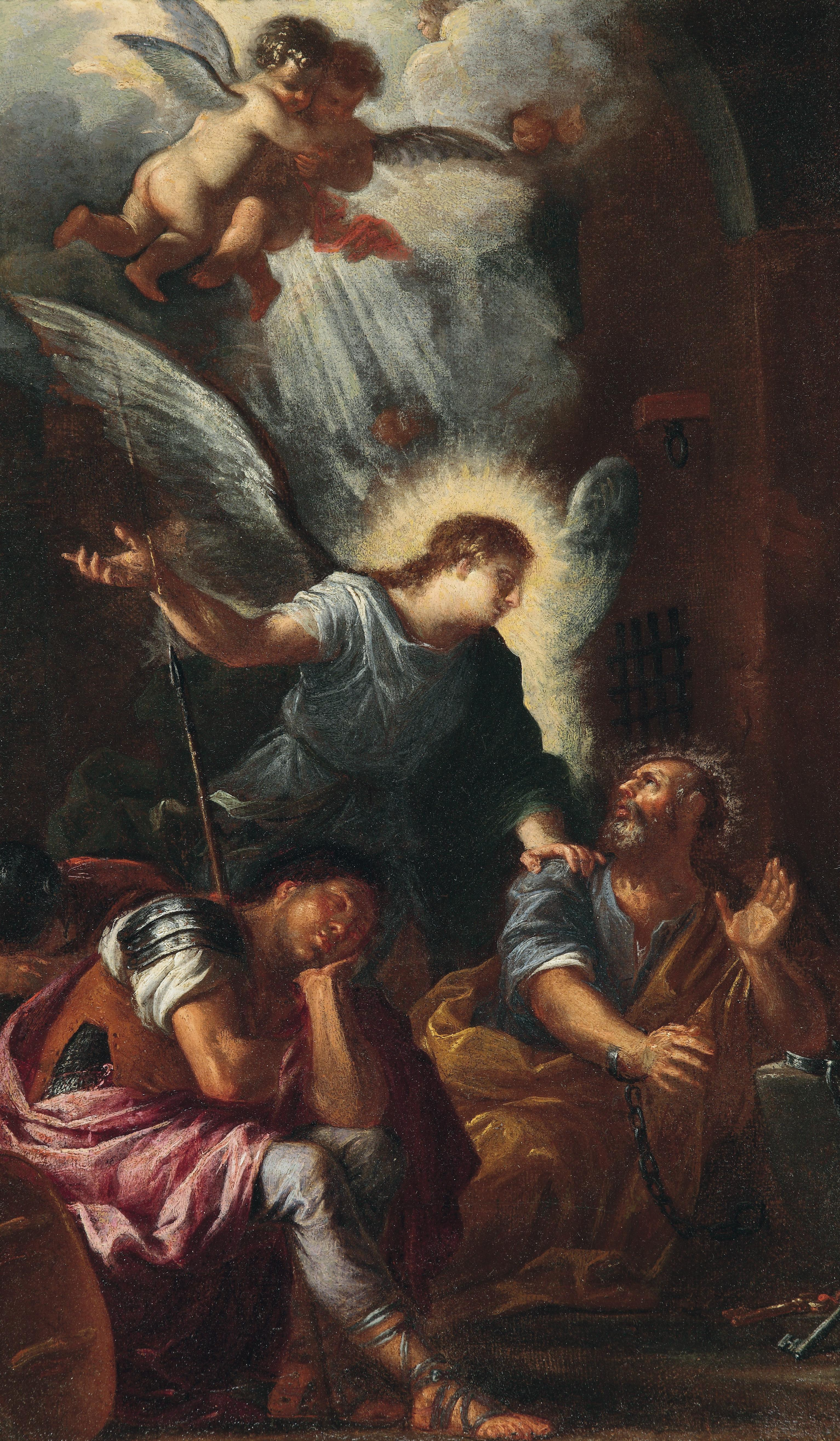
- Giovanni Ghisolfi, Saint Peter Freed from Prison, Santa Maria della Vittoria, Milan
- Born: 1623; Milan, Duchy of Milan
- Died: 7 July 1683 (aged 59–60); Milan, Duchy of Milan
- Known for: Painting
- Movement: Baroque

Giovanni Ghisolfi (1623 – 7 June 1683) was an Italian painter of the Baroque period, best known for his landscape paintings and capricci.

== Biography ==
Born in Milan in 1623, he initially trained with his uncle, the painter Antonio Volpino. At the age of 17, he traveled to Rome with his friend Antonio Busca, where he studied the work of Pietro da Cortona and frequented the studio of Salvator Rosa. In Rome he painted vedute and capricci, mainly landscapes with architectural fragments and ruins. They would garner renewed interest with the rise of Neoclassicism in the mid-late 18th century.

In 1661, he decorated a chapel of the Certosa di Pavia. In 1664 he was called to Vicenza to execute a series of decorative landscape frescoes in the Palazzo Trissino Baston and the Palazzo Giustiniani Baggio. He painted also in Palazzo Borromeo Arese at Cesano, Reatis' Palace in Lissone and in the fourth chapel of the Sacri Monti and frescoed the vaults of the Basilica of San Vittore in Varese.

Ghisolfi died in Milan on 7 June 1683 and was buried in the church of San Giovanni in Conca. Among his pupils was his nephew, Bernardo Racchetti from Milan (1639–1702). Ghisolfi's reputation today rests on his capricci, small landscapes with ruins and romantic figures, which anticipate the style of Giovanni Paolo Panini. His canvases are preserved in many European galleries, among them the Scottish National Gallery, Edinburgh (e.g. Landscape with Ruins, Ruins and Figures), the Musée d'Art et d'Histoire de Narbonne (e.g. The Triumph of Silenus) and the Gemäldegalerie Alte Meister, Dresden (e.g. Harbour Scene).

== Gallery ==
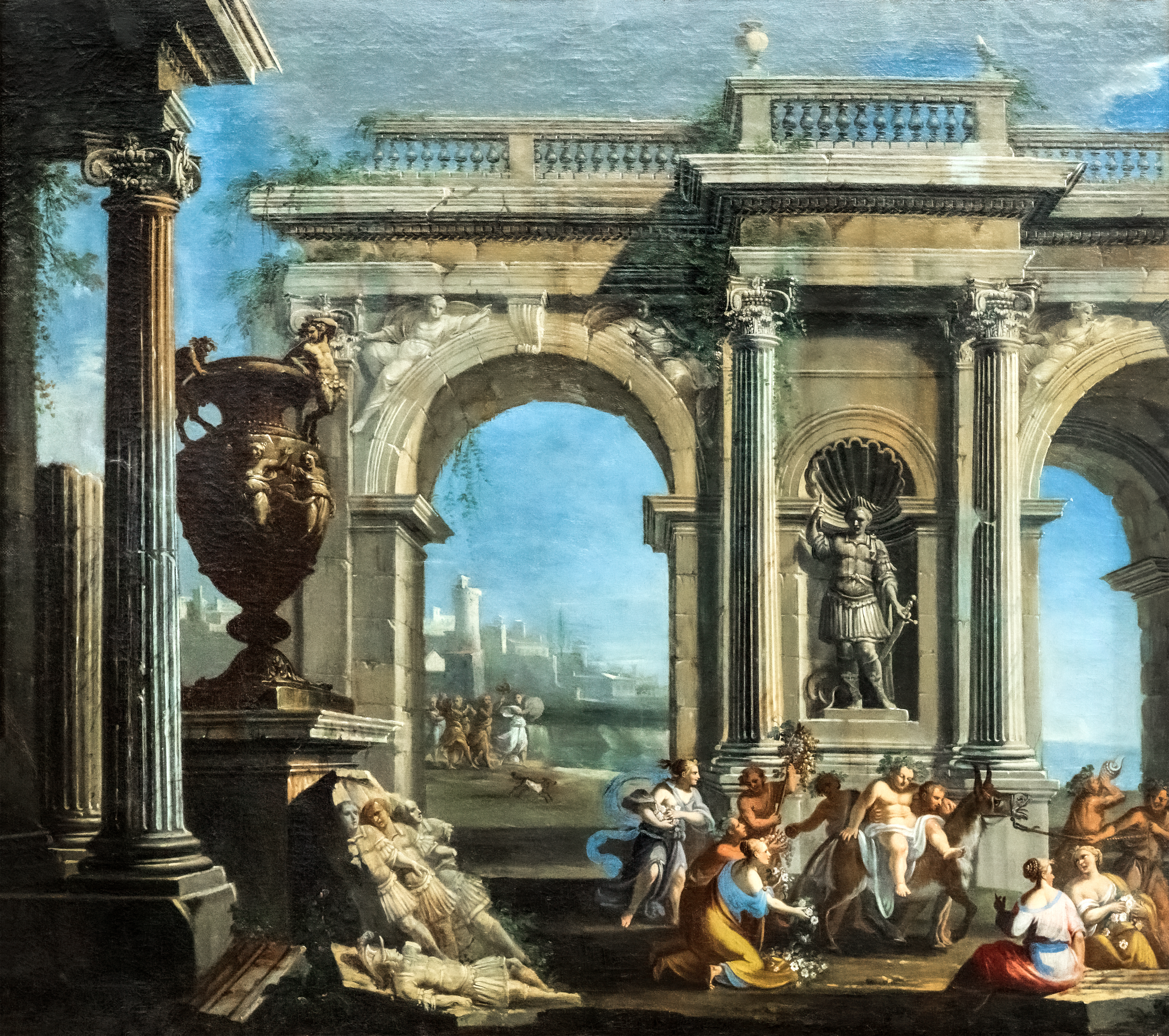
The Triumph of Silenus, Musée d'Art et d'Histoire de Narbonne

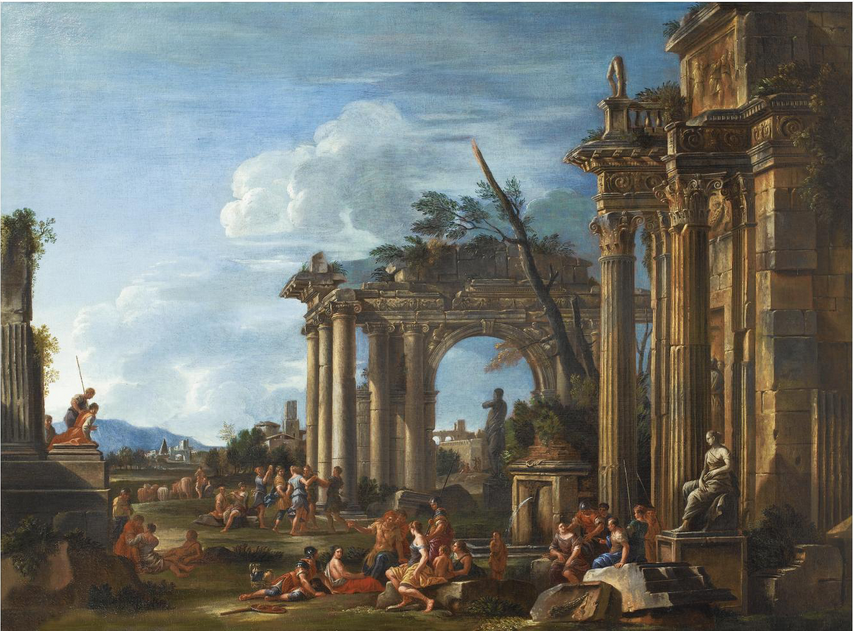
Architectural Capriccio With Conversing Figures, priv. col.

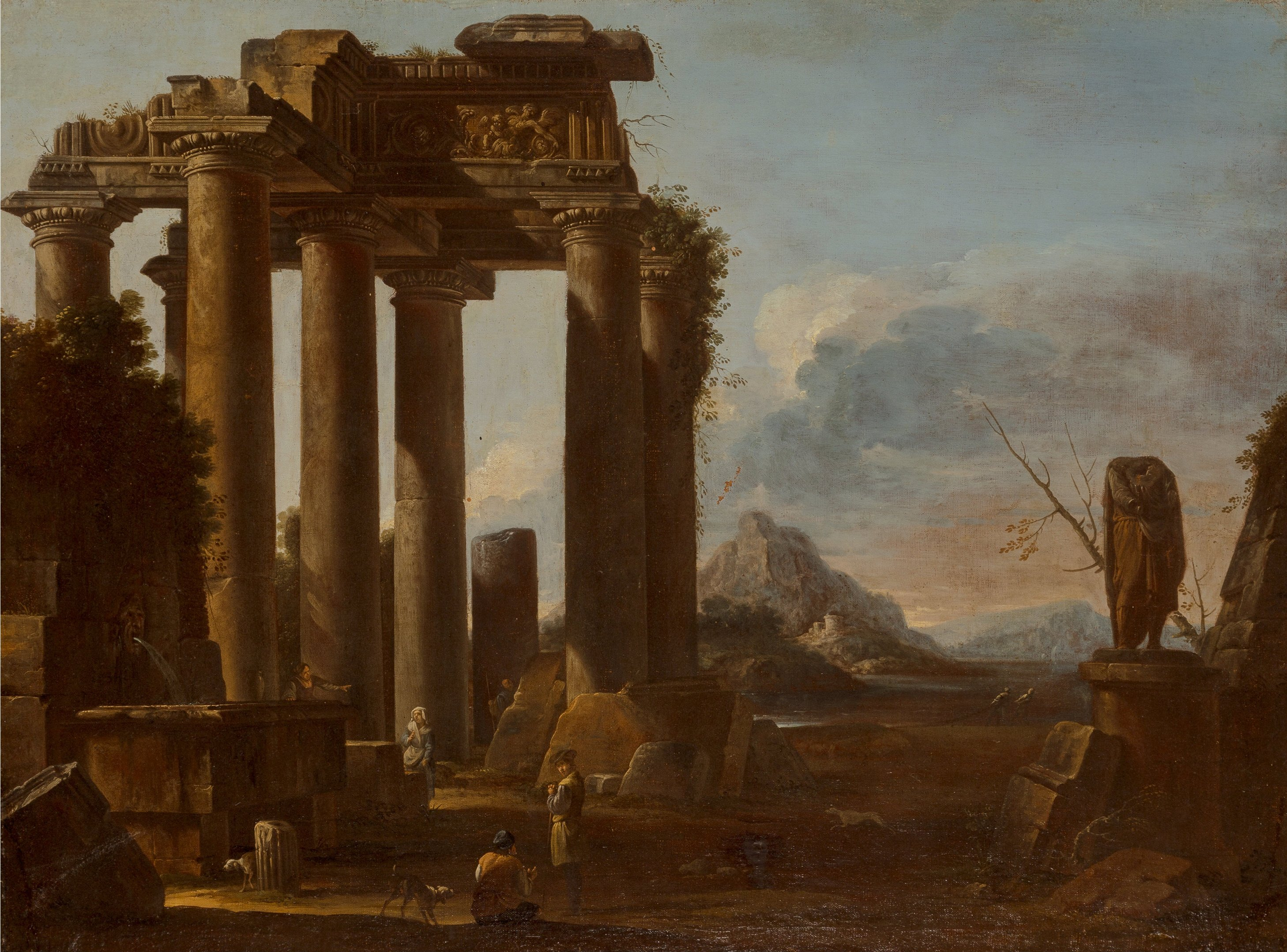
Two Classical Temples in Ruins with Statue, priv. col.

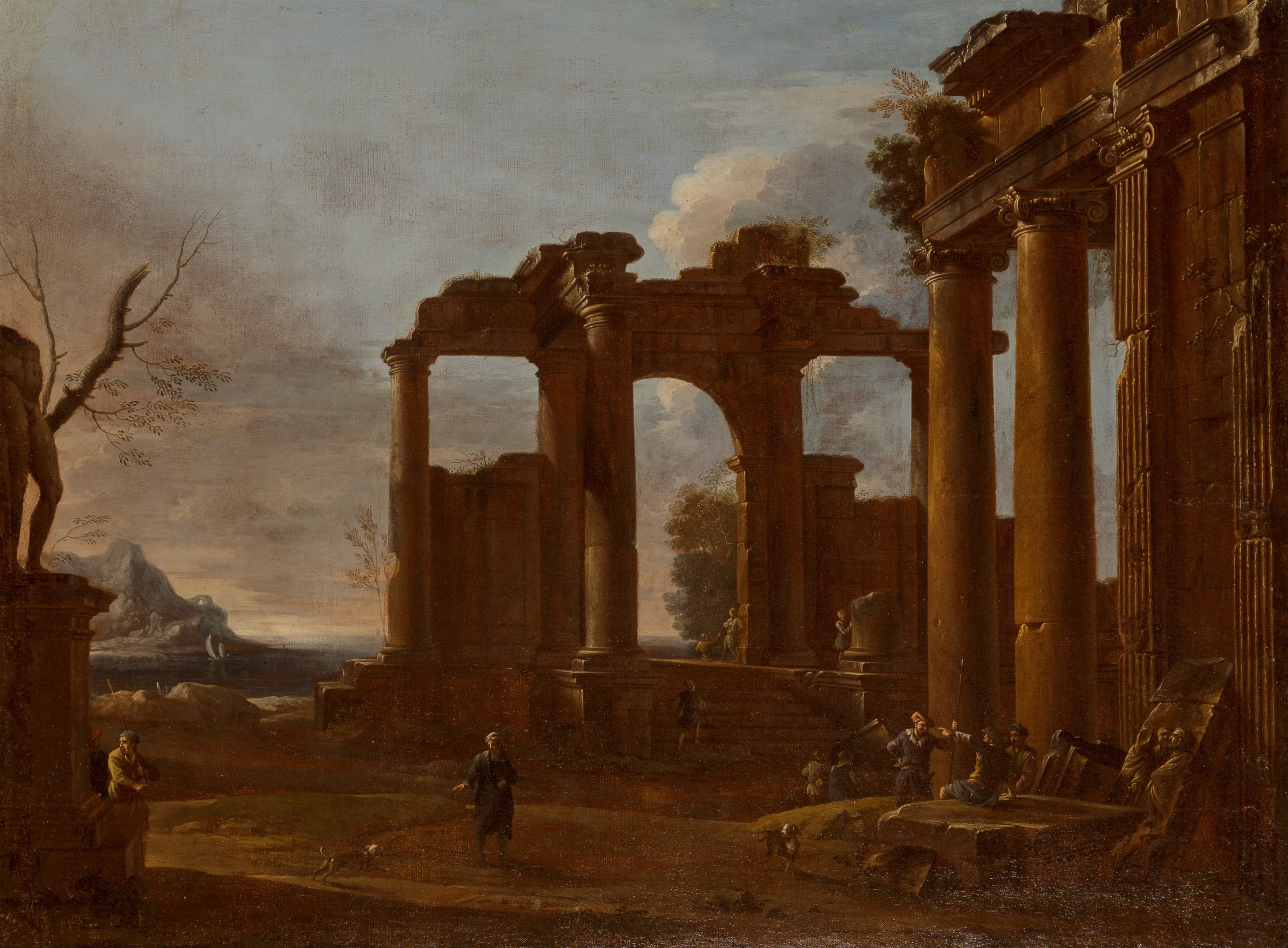
A Ruined Classical Temple of the Tuscan Order with Figures, priv. col.

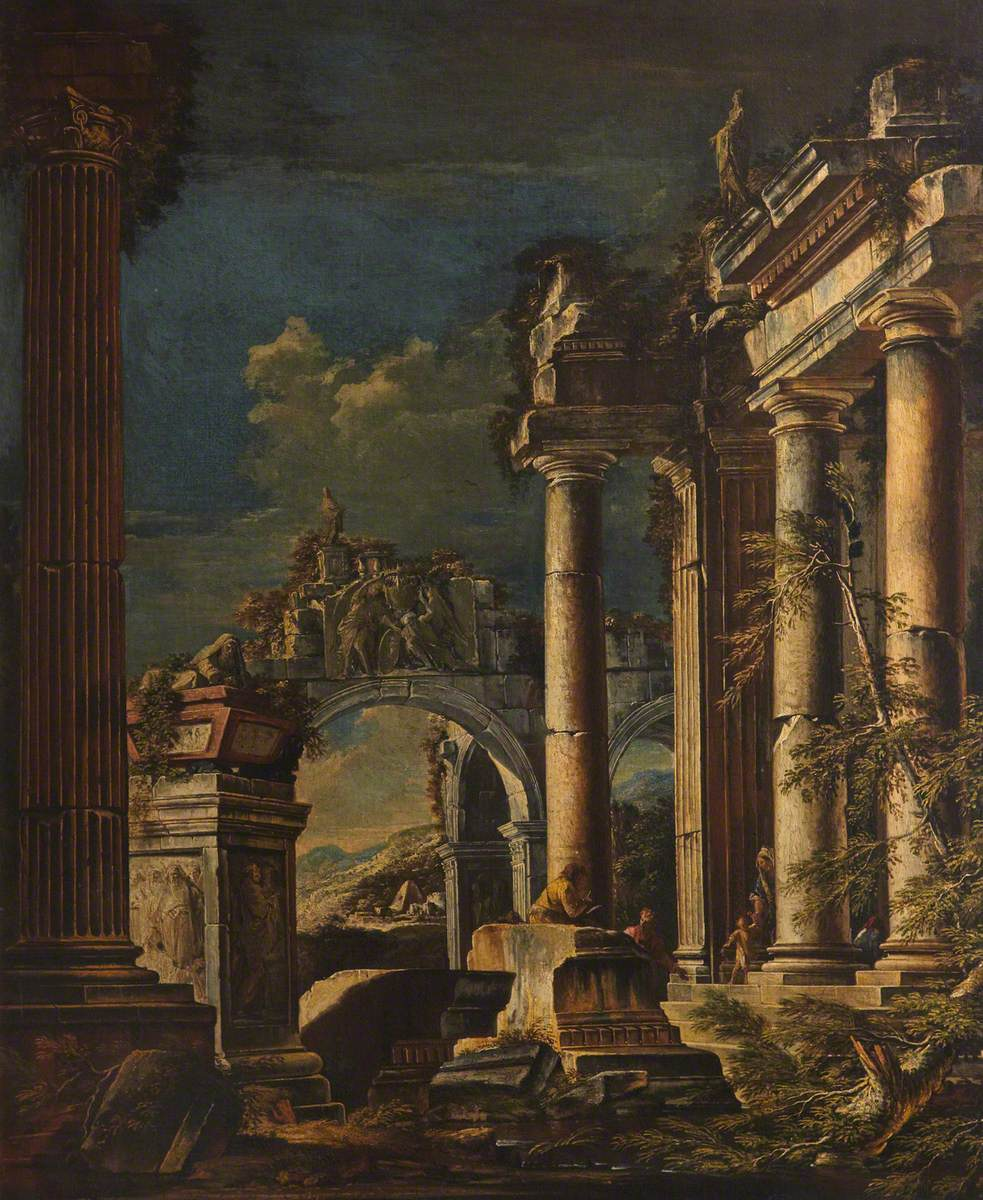
Ruins and Figures, The Torrie Collection, Edinburgh

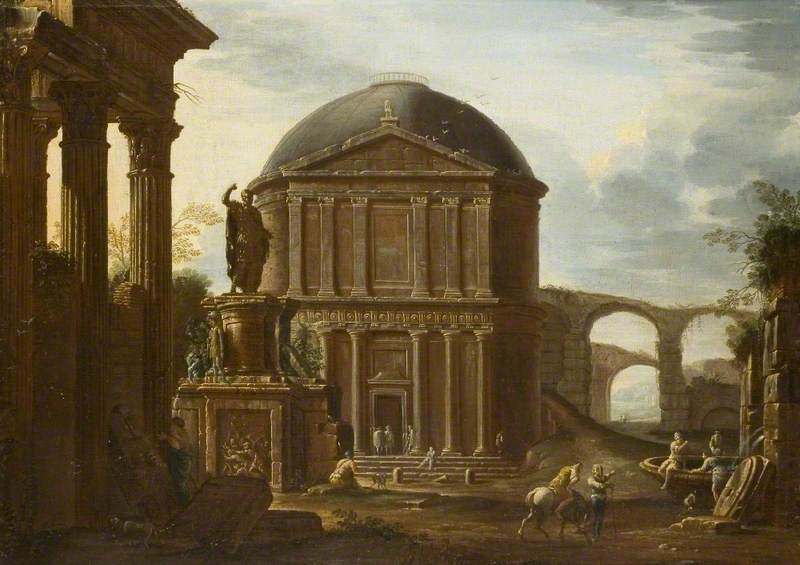
Capriccio, Beecroft Art Gallery, Southend-on-Sea, Essex, England

== Bibliography ==
- Wittkower, Rudolf (1980). Art and Architecture in Italy, 1600-1750. Penguin Books. p. 350.
- "Ghisolfi, Giovanni". Artnet. Archived from the original on 14 February 2005.
