= Santa Biondo =

American opera singer

- Santa Biondo, 1929
- Born: December 3, 1892; San Mauro Castelverde, Sicily
- Died: February 15, 1989 (aged 96); Stamford, Connecticut
- Occupation: Opera singer
- Years active: 1927–1938

Santa Biondo (December 3, 1892, San Mauro Castelverde, Sicily – February 15, 1989, Stamford, Connecticut) was an American opera star whose career spanned from 1927 to 1938.

== Early life and career ==
Santa Biondo was born on December 3, 1892, on Via Serra, San Mauro Castelverde, Sicily. She immigrated to 106 Wallace Street, New Haven, Connecticut with her father Mauro, her mother Giuseppa, her sister Angela, and her brother Mauro Jr. on October 2, 1907 They were received by Santa's older brother, Domenico Biondo, who was already living at Wallace Street at that time.

Three years later, in 1910, the United States Census shows the family living in New Haven at the same address. The census indicates that Biondo was 18 years old and working in a tailor's shop. By 1920, the family had moved to Saint John Street in New Haven, and Santa Biondo was married to her first husband, Salvatore Mazullo. Mazullo was the proprietor of a tailor shop, perhaps the same one where Santa Biondo worked before.

However, Biondo's destiny was in music. Encouraged by her brother in-law, Biondo was tutored by professional opera teachers in New Haven and New York, including Enrico Rosati, whose other famous students include Beniamino Gigli and Mario Lanza. Biondo began her professional career in 1927, when she went on tour with the San Carlo Opera Company and the American Opera Company.

== Metropolitan Opera Company ==
Santa Biondo appears in a newspaper story printed in the May 12, 1929, edition of The Hartford Courant, where she is stated to have been preparing for her debut with the Metropolitan Opera Company ("Met") in New York City after separate auditions with Arturo Toscanini and the Met staff. A copy of her Met employment contract indicates that her starting pay was $75 a week with a year-by-year renewal provision through 1933.

The author of The Hartford Courant article described Biondo's voice as a "lyric-dramatic soprano, lyric for its 'facility of emission' and dramatic for its power and fullness of expression. It is a rare and much sought after combination." Biondo sang in Italian, French and English.

Biondo sang for the Met from November 23, 1929, to March 26, 1932, in 31 different performances. After her debut as Nedda in Pagliacci, Biondo sang in a number of other operas for the Met, including Cavalleria Rusticana, La Bohème, Iris, Peter Ibbetson, and La Notte di Zoraima, in which she performed in the role of Manuela with Rosa Ponselle.

== Disappearance ==
During the Great Depression, opera companies were hit financially, and both Biondo and the Met fell on hard times. In December 1931, Santa Biondo lost $19,000 in the stock market, and she disappeared from New York, leaving three suicide notes behind. Biondo went missing for only three days, from December 11 to December 14, but detectives launched a manhunt, and the search for Biondo was reported in newspapers all across the United States. One article, published in The Coshocton Tribune, claimed that the New York Police Department dredged the lake in Central Park, looking for her body. Contrary to her notes, however, she did not in fact attempt suicide but instead went into seclusion outside of the City.

With the aid of friends and family, Santa Biondo snapped out of it and went back to work. When newspapers asked her why she left, she offered conflicting explanations, but it was clear that she was depressed about her financial situation. And although she didn't say it, she may have been aware that her career at the Metropolitan Opera Company was drawing to a close. She performed her last engagement at the Met just three months later, in March 1932.

At that point in time, Santa Biondo was still married to Salvatore Mazullo, but they had been apart for three years. Biondo lived at the Plaza Hotel Annex, in New York City, while Salvatore Mazullo continued to live in New Haven.

== Performances with other opera companies ==
By September 1932, Santa Biondo was back on stage, singing in the title role in Aïda at Bryant Park for the Puccini Grand Opera Company. And the very next month, she sang in the role of Musetta in "La Bohème" at the New Amsterdam Theatre for the San Carlo Opera Company. Biondo continued to sing for the San Carlo Opera Company, Hippodrome National Opera Company, and the Franz Philipp Opera Company from 1932 through 1937. Her retinue included La Traviata, Faust, Manon (title role), Pagliacci, and Tosca (title role, 1937).

These were no small concerts. The New York Times states that, in 1934, she sang in the role of Mimi in "La Bohème" for a throng of 5,000 at a Hippodrome National Opera Company event. And in 1934, she sang for 5,200 as Tosca, again for the Hippodrome National Opera Company.

The June 14, 1936, issue of The New York Times states that she also performed with the Cincinnati Opera at the Cincinnati Zoo and Botanical Garden with other opera singers such as Rosemarie Brancato, Anna Leskaya, Jean Pengelly, Norma Richter, and others.

Biondo continued to perform until February 1938, but there isn't any mention of her career thereafter. She apparently retired from singing at the professional level around that time.

== Radio performances, recitals ==
At the height of her career, Santa Biondo performed at least one radio broadcast. The September 22, 1929, edition of the Atlanta Constitution newspaper announced, "Santa Biondo, soprano with the Metropolitan Opera Company, will be the featured artist with an orchestra under the direction of Josef Pasternack in the broadcast of the Atwater Kent concert on the N.B.C. coast-to-coast system tonight at 7:15 o'clock."

In January 1930, she sang at a duet with Beniamino Gigli in an "Artistic Morning" recital at the Plaza Hotel in New York.

On April 29, 1934, she sang in the role of the Angel in the premier performance of Pietro Yon's "Triumph of Saint Patrick" at Carnegie Hall in New York City. Biondo continued to perform in this role at St. Patrick's Cathedral, New York, for Patrick Cardinal Hayes. In December 1934, she sang for the Italian Ambassador, Augusto Rosso, in Newark, New Jersey, at the Shubert Theater, with other Italian-American performers.

== Retirement ==
After retiring from her career, Santa Biondo married Dr. Philip Giordano, advertising director of Il Progresso Italo-Americano newspaper and editor of Bolletino della Sera.

Santa Biondo died on February 15, 1989, in Stamford, Connecticut. She is buried in the Biondo family plot in Saint Lawrence Cemetery located adjacent to the Yale Bowl in New Haven, Connecticut.

== Photos ==
Santa Biondo as "Santuzza" in "Cavalleria Rusticana" with the San Carlo Opera Company.

Santa Biondo as Micaela in "Carmen" with the San Carlo Opera Company.

Santa Biondo as Marguerite in "Faust" with the San Carlo Opera Company.

Santa Biondo as Manuela and Rosa Ponselle as Zoraima in "La Notte di Zoraima".
