= Girolamo Bonini =

Italian painter

Girolamo Bonini (active 1660, died 1680) was an Italian painter of the Baroque period, active mainly in Bologna. Also known as L'Aconitano due to his natal city of Ancona. He was the pupil of the painter Francesco Albani. Bonini was part of a team, including Lorenzo Pasinelli, Luigi Scaramuccia, and Giovanni Maria Bibiena, working under Carlo Cignani in the decoration of the Sala Farnese of the city hall of Bologna.
