= Tempio Valdese =

Church in Milan, Italy

Coordinates: 45.4615°N 9.1968°E

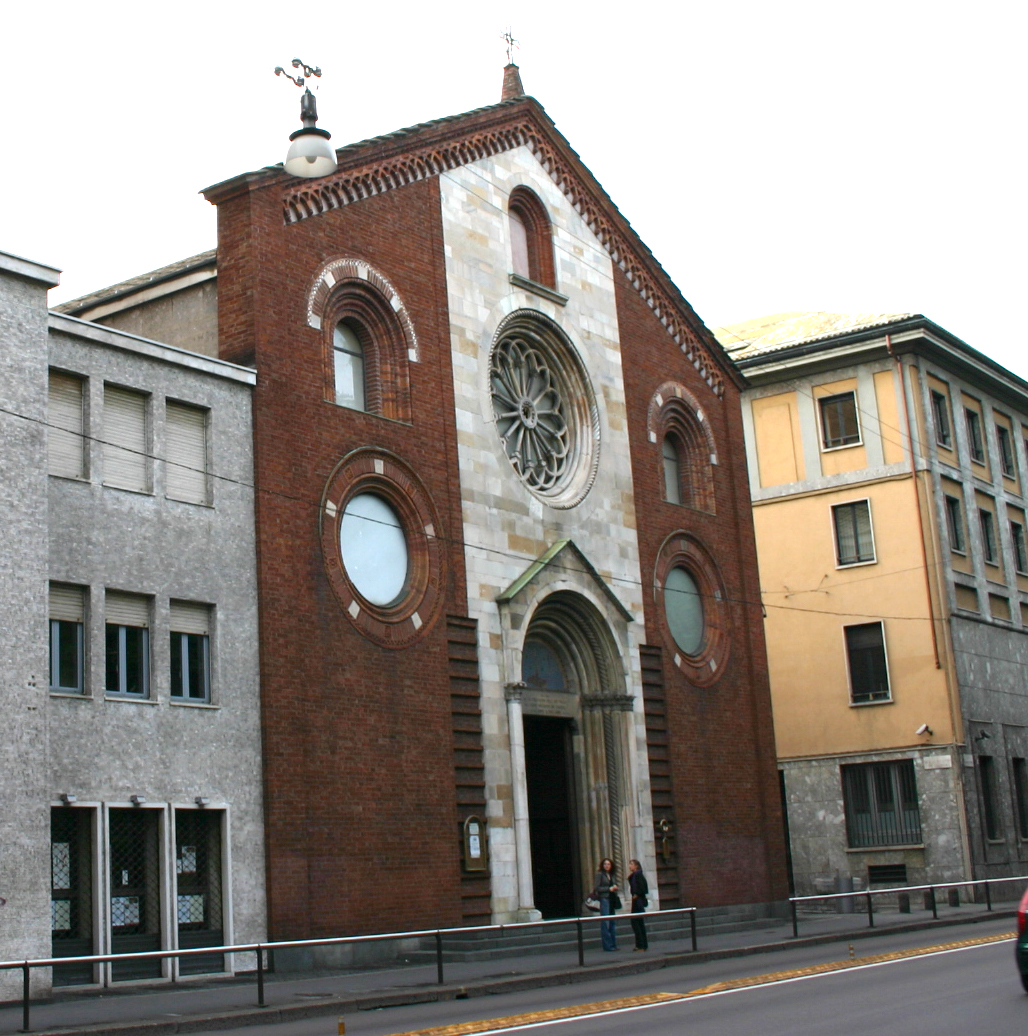

Tempio Valdese is a Protestant church in Milan, Italy. It was built in 1950.

The Waldensian Church in Milan incorporates the façade of the now demolished church of San Giovanni in Conca, which was located in Piazza Missori.

The preserved façade originally belonged to the medieval Basilica of San Giovanni in Conca, whose history dates back to early Christian Milan. The Waldensian community acquired the remains of the church in the late 19th century, after urban redevelopment had already led to the demolition of part of the original building. Architect Angelo Colla adapted and restored the façade in a Neo-Romanesque style before it was incorporated into the Waldensian place of worship. During post-war road construction, San Giovanni in Conca was largely demolished, but its façade was dismantled in 1948 and transferred to the present Tempio Valdese. Parts of the original apse and the crypt survive at the former church site in Piazza Missori.
