= Stadio Silvio Appiani =

Building in Padua, Italy

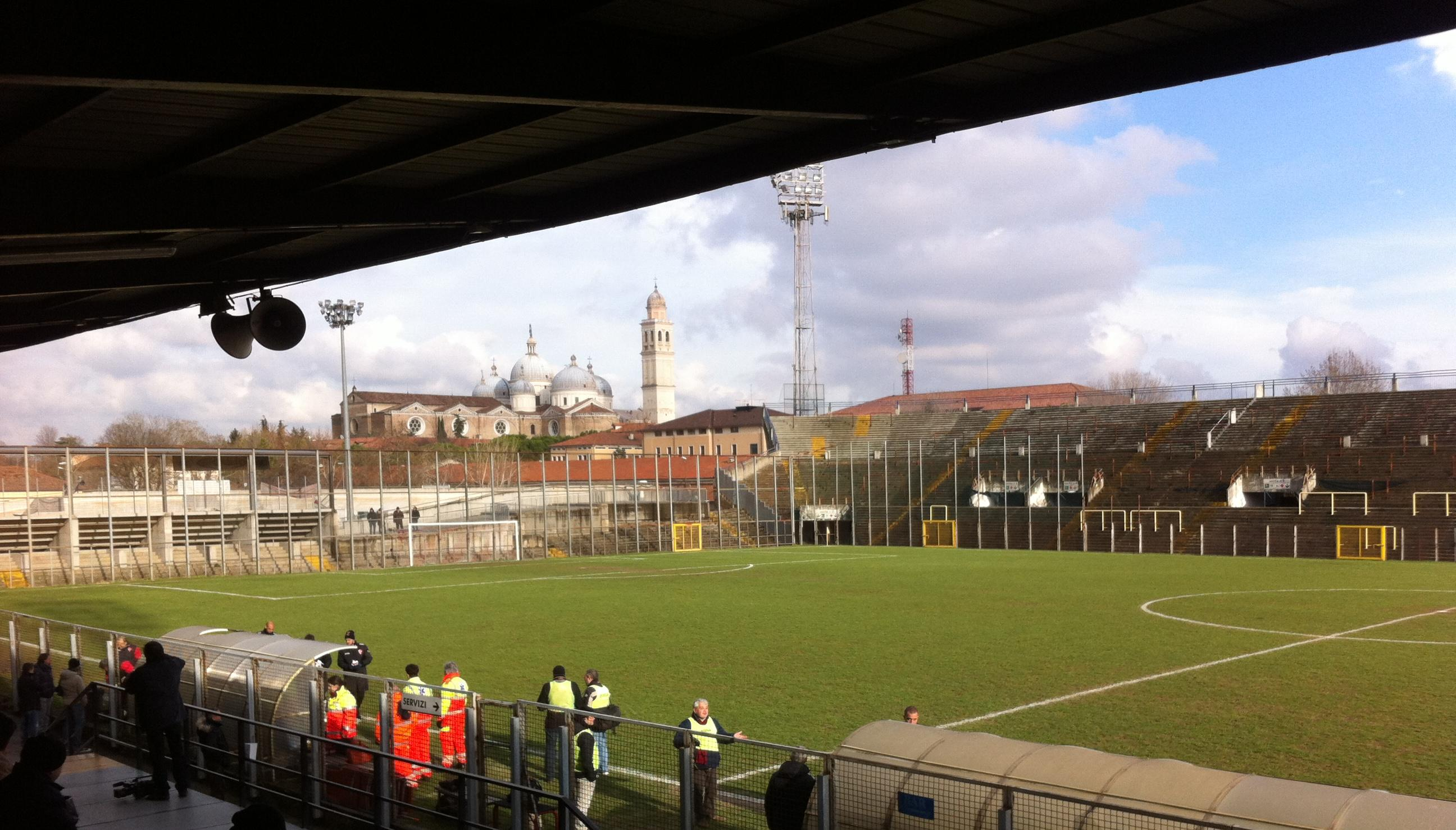
- Interactive map of Stadio Silvio Appiani
- Full name: Stadio Silvio Appiani
- Location: Padua, Italy
- Coordinates: 45°23′42″N 11°52′31″E
- Owner: Calcio Padova
- Operator: Calcio Padova
- Capacity: 24,000

Construction
- Opened: 1924
- Closed: 1994

Tenant
- Calcio Padova

Stadio Silvio Appiani is a multi-use stadium in Padua, Italy. It was initially used as the stadium of Calcio Padova matches. It was replaced by Stadio Euganeo in 1994. The capacity of the stadium was 24,000 spectators. The name is chosen in honour of Silvio Appiani. Since 2015 it is one of Calcio Padova's training grounds and hosts some youth games. The current capacity is 1,400 spectators.
