= San Giacomo e Filippo, Pavia =

Church in Pavia, Italy

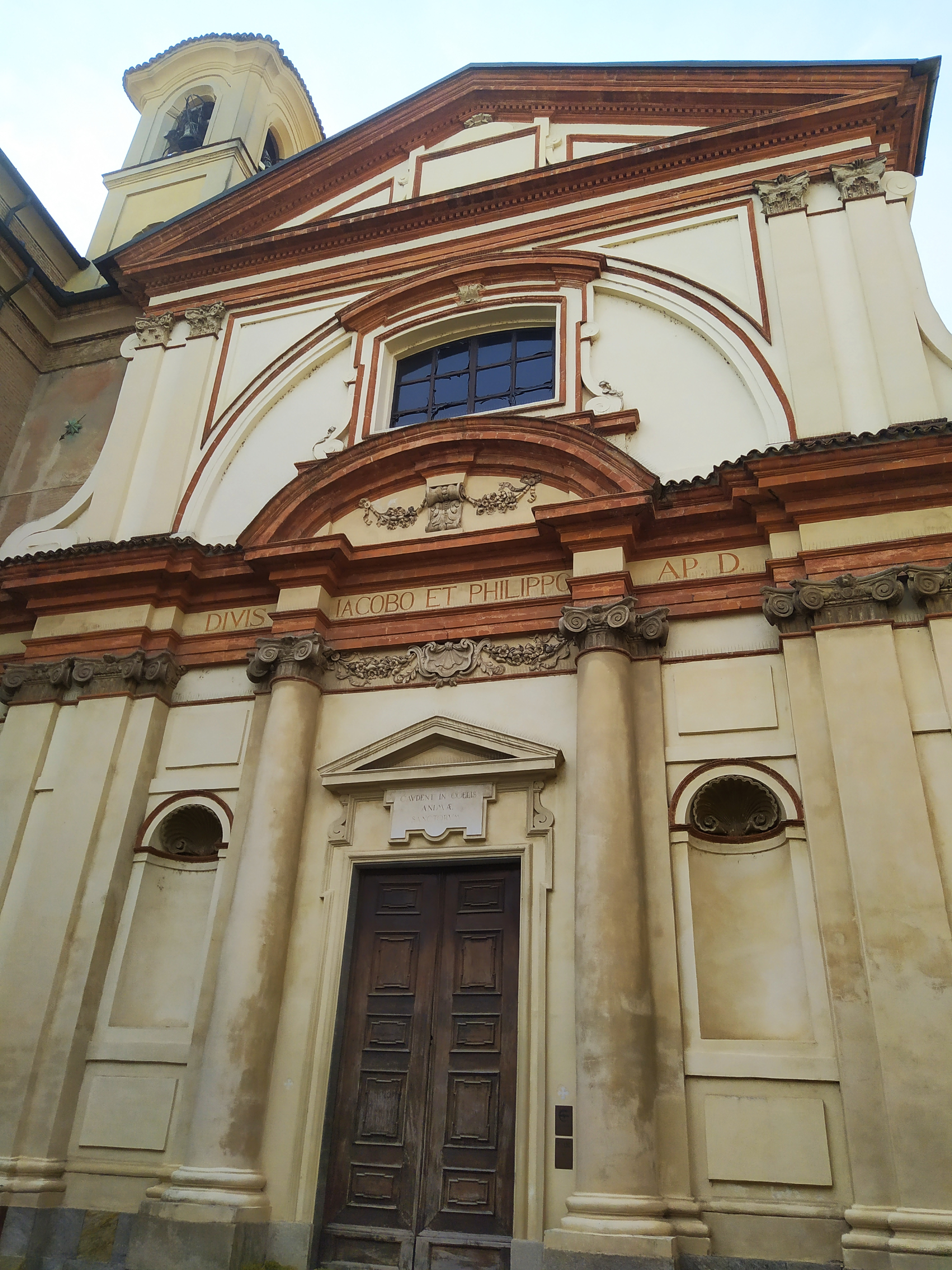
San Giacomo e Filippo Church in Pavia

San Giacomo e Filippo is a Baroque-style Roman Catholic church in the town center of Pavia, Italy.

== History ==
The present church was reconstructed in 1626 at the site of an earlier medieval church documented by 1250. Initially the church belonged to the Regular clerics of San Ciro. In 1680, it was passed to the Lazarist Mission of St Vincent, and then in 1887 to Padri Stimatini. Initially dedicated to St Phillip, by 1576 it was known by its present name.

== Description ==
The main altar has an Assumption and an Annunciation by il Montalto. To the right of the main altar is an Adoration of the Magi by Pietro Micheli, he also painted the St Vincent of Paoli in the second chapel on the left. The first chapel has an altarpiece of Saints Anthony and Francis by E. Acerbi, a relative of Mario Acerbi. The counterfacade has a lunette originally from the church of San Innocenzo (now suppressed), work by Agostino da Vaprio.
