= Francesco Vico =

Italian painter

Francesco Vico (17th century) was an Italian painter of the Baroque period..

He was born in Milan. He painted two canvases for the Milan Hospital, one representing Francesco and Bianca Maria Sforza kneeling before Pope Pius II, who grants them the Bull to build the hospital, and the other the same couple kneeling in front of an altar before the hospital.
