= Johann Christoph Storer =

German Baroque painter (1611–1671)

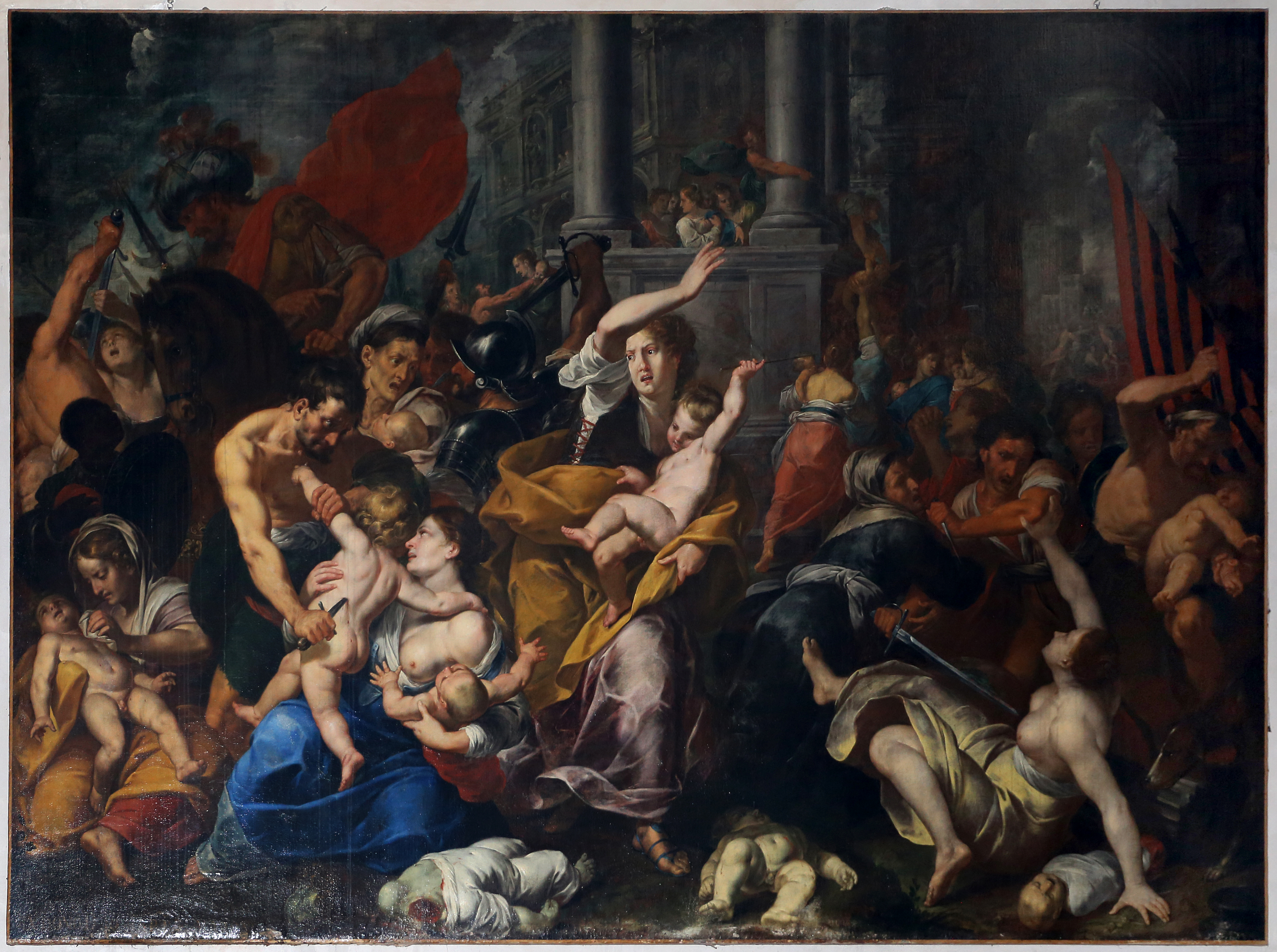
- Massacre of the Innocents, Basilica of Sant'Eustorgio, Milan
- Born: 20 July 1611; Konstanz, Holy Roman Empire
- Died: 15 January 1671 (aged 59); Konstanz, Holy Roman Empire
- Education: Ercole Procaccini the Younger
- Known for: Painting
- Movement: Baroque

Johann Christoph Storer (Konstanz, 20 July 1611 – Konstanz, 15 January 1671) was a German Baroque painter, draughtsman and etcher.

== Biography ==
The apprentice of his father, Bartholomäus Storer (1586–1635), and then in Italy the pupil of Ercole Procaccini the Younger, he acquired 'a steady hand in drawing' and a 'good manner in oils and on wet lime'. He painted frescoes (1640–45) at the Palazzo Terzi in Bergamo and c. 1644 worked on the decorations for the burial of Queen Elisabeth of Spain in Milan Cathedral. In his finest work, ceiling paintings (1653–7) in the San Sisto chapel of San Lorenzo, Milan, his use of colour anticipated the High Baroque. From 1657 he lived in Konstanz; commissions for altarpieces (e.g. the signed Flagellation, Felde, near Friedburg, St. Afra) took him to Augsburg, Munich and other cities and made him indisputably a church painter, although he retained the freely developed decorative style he had assimilated in Northern Italy. His drawings are characterized by light strokes and the 'sudden introduction of diagonal hatching, isolated patches of shading'. Outstanding among them is the square pen drawing of the Meeting of Peter and Paul on the Way to the Place of Execution (Kunstsammlungen & Museen Augsburg). His designs for works in silver demonstrate an affinity with painted decoration, as in busts of St. Peter and St. Paul (designs, 1664; busts, Konstanz Minster).

== Gallery ==
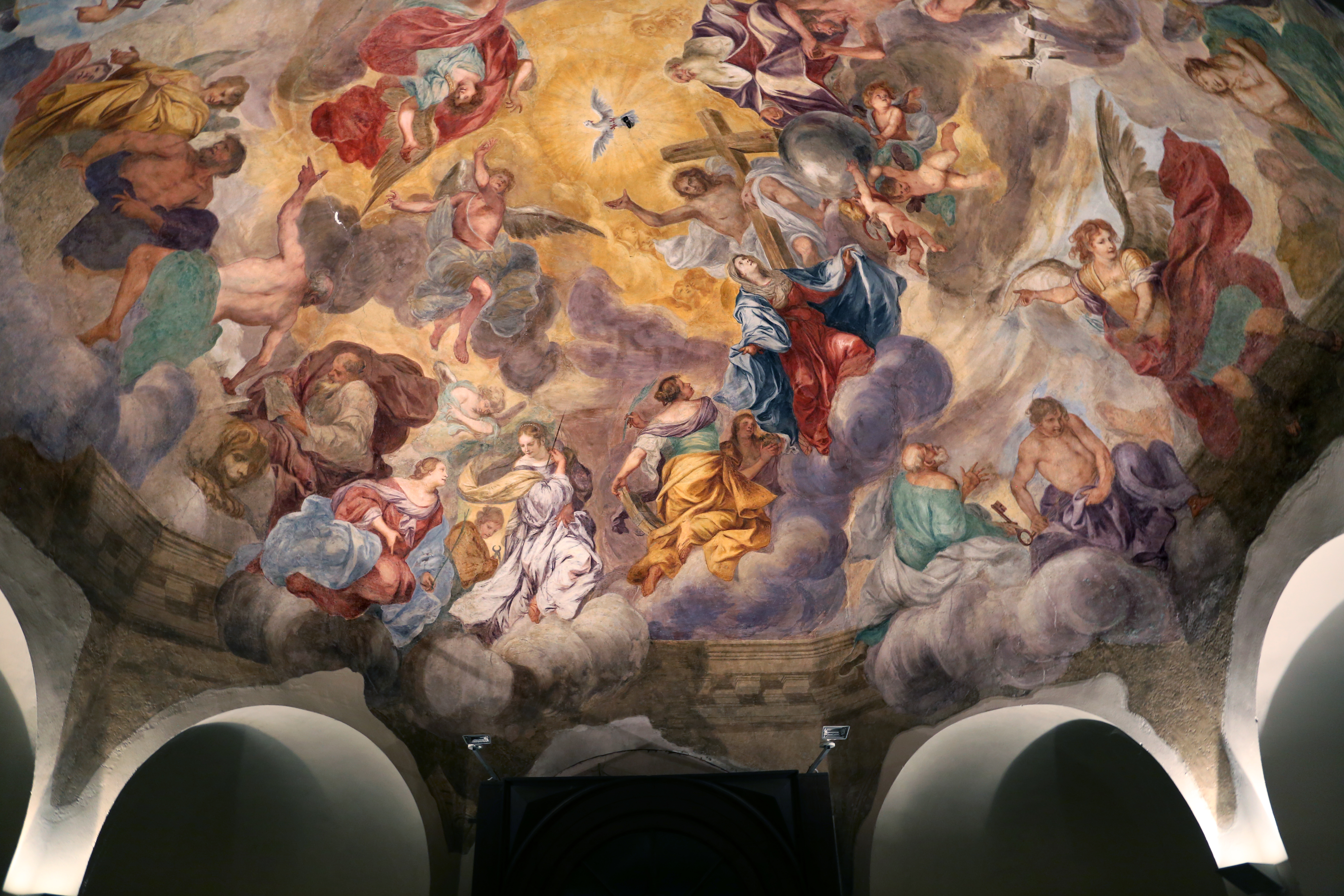
Ceiling paintings (1653–7) in the San Sisto chapel of the Basilica of San Lorenzo, Milan

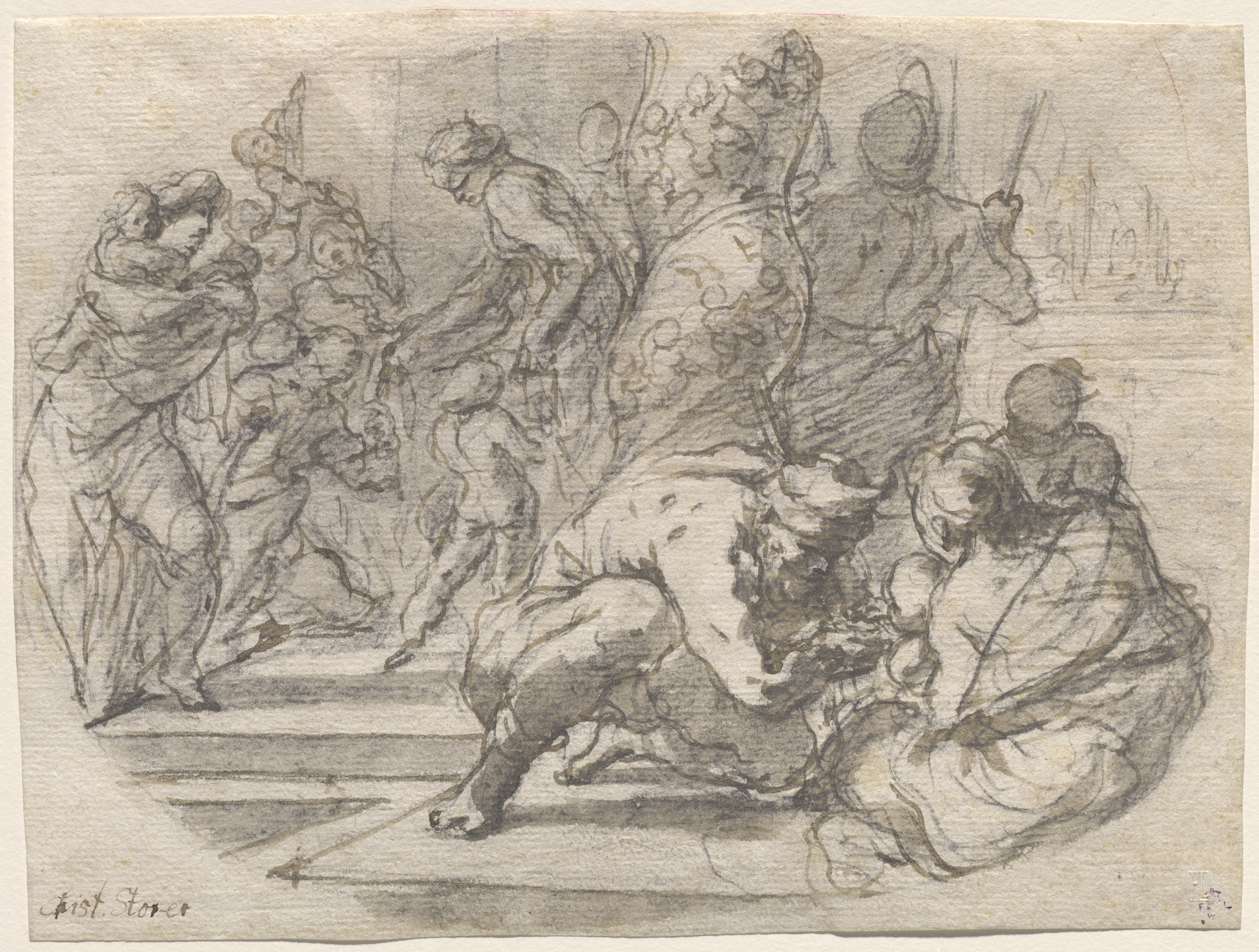
The Generosity of Empress Pulcheria, 1644, National Gallery of Art, Washington, D.C.

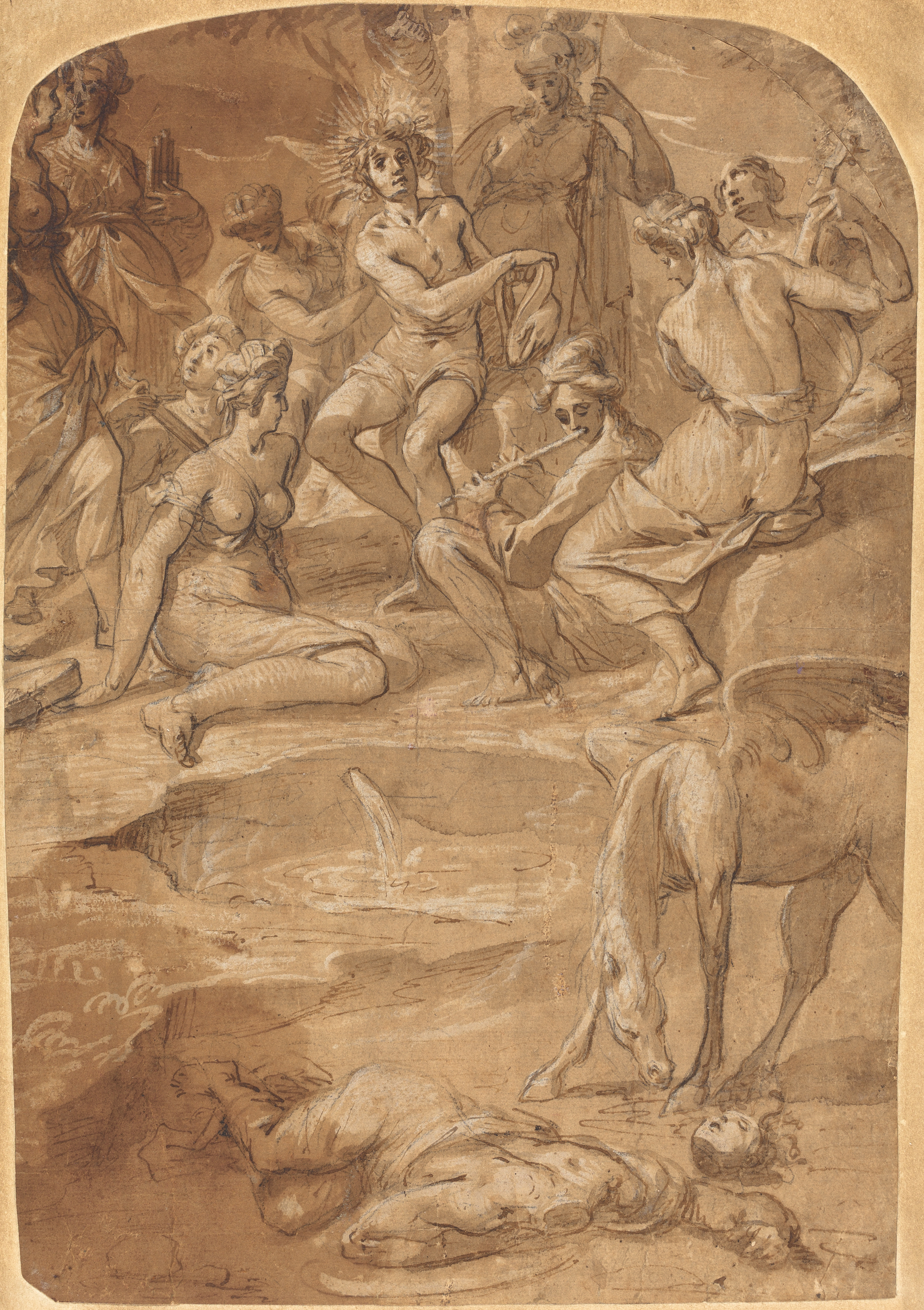
Apollo and the Muses on Mount Parnassus, c. 1650, National Gallery of Art, Washington, D.C.

== Sources ==
- Sandrart, Joachim von (1683). Academia nobilissimae artis pictoriae. Nuremberg.
- Thöne, Friedrich (1938–1939). "Der Maler Johann Christophorus Storer als Zeichner". Münchner Jahrbuch der bildenden Kunst. 13: 212–34.
- Bora, Giulio (1991). "Note sull'attività milanese di Gian Cristoforo Storer". Arte Lombarda. 98/99 (3–4): 29–40. JSTOR 43132261.
- Appuhn-Radtke, Sibylle (2000). Visuelle Medien im Dienst der Gesellschaft Jesu. Johann Christoph Storer (1620–1671) als Maler der katholischen Reform. Regensburg: Schnell & Steiner. ISBN 978-3795412838.
