= Carlo Bacchiocco =

Italian painter

Carlo Bacchiocco was an Italian painter, born in Milan. The volume Scelte Pitture di Brescia by Averoldo mentions several of his pictures in Brescia, particularly in the church of SS. Giacomo e Filippo and Santa Maria degl'Angeli.
