= Leonardo di Bisuccio =

Italian painter

Leonardo di Bisuccio (15th century) was an Italian painter of the Renaissance period, who painted in the style of the school of Milan.

Bisuccio was born in Milan. He is best known for his frescoes of Christ Crowning the virgin in the memorial chapel for Giovanni Carracciolo in San Giovanni a Carbonari in Naples.

== Sources ==
- Bryan, Michael (1886). Robert Edmund Graves (ed.). Dictionary of Painters and Engravers, Biographical and Critical. Vol. I: A-K. London: George Bell and Sons. p. 131.
- Farquhar, Maria (1855). Ralph Nicholson Wornum (ed.). Biographical catalogue of the principal Italian painters. London: Woodfall & Kinder. p. 27.
