= San Giovanni in Conca, Milan =

Demolished church in Milan (Italy)

- Basilica di San Giovanni in Conca
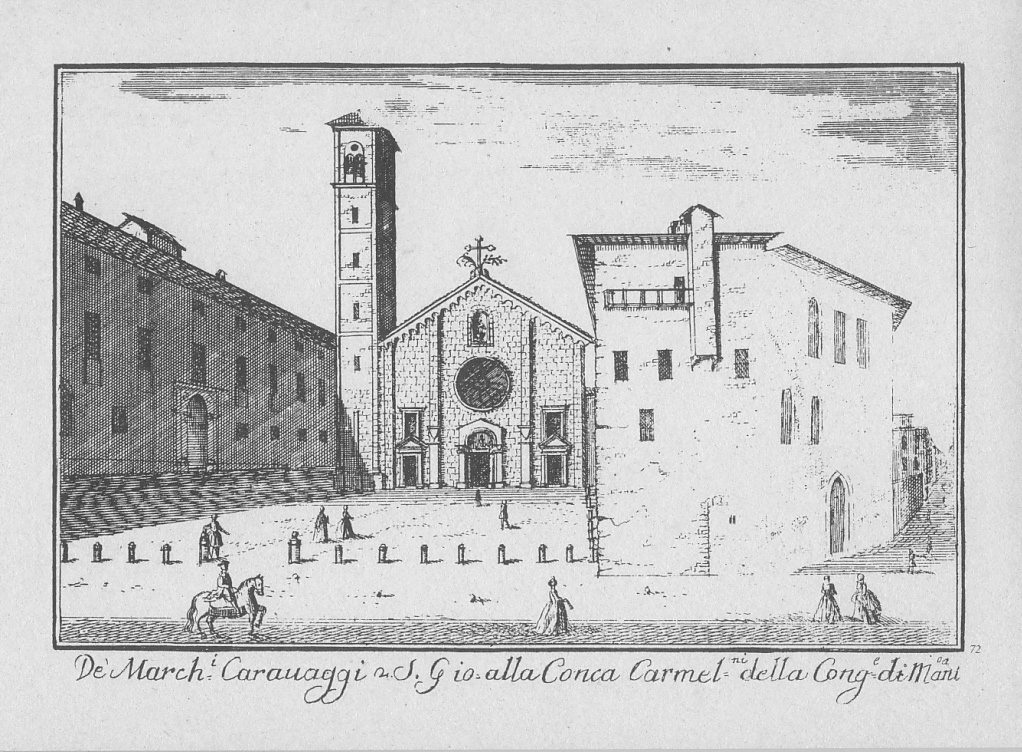
- San Giovanni in Conca (engraving by Marc'Antonio Dal Re)

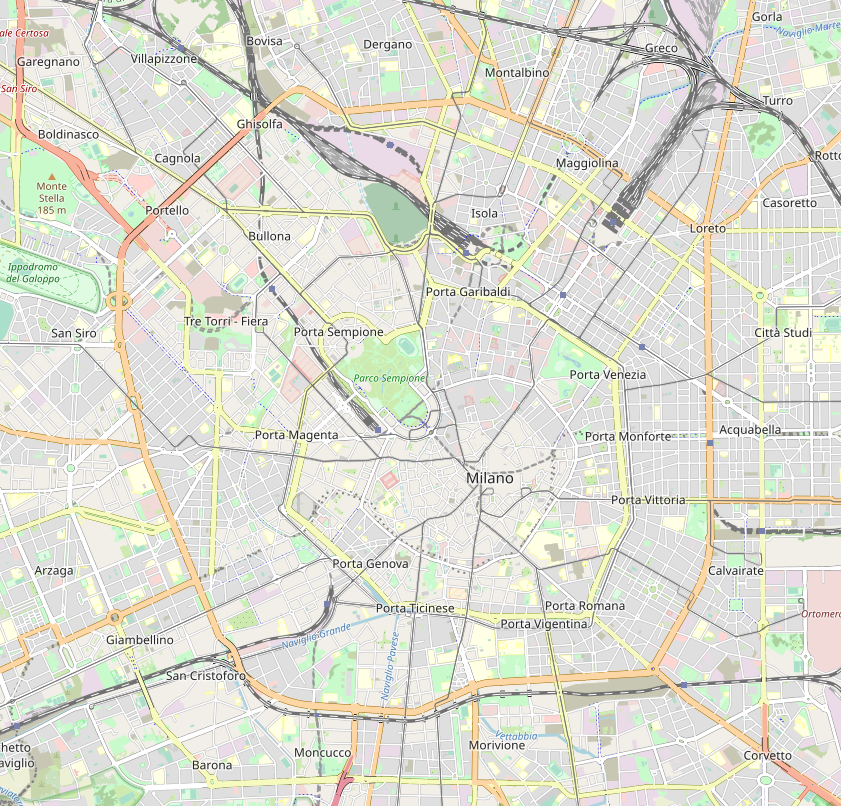
- Location in Milan
- 45°27′39″N 9°11′18″E
- Location: Piazza Missori; 20123 Milan
- Country: Italy
- Denomination: Roman Catholic and Waldensian
- Tradition: Ambrosian Rite (Roman Catholic)
- Religious institute: Carmelites (from 1548 to 1783)

History
- Dedication: John the Evangelist

Architecture
- Functional status: Demolished (crypt and part of the apse preserved)
- Style: Paleochristian and Romanesque
- Demolished: 19th and 20th centuries

San Giovanni in Conca was a church in the center of Milan, northern Italy, dedicated to Saint John the Evangelist. It had a Paleochristian origin and went through a renovation in Romanesque style. In the 13th century, it became part of the private compound of the Visconti house and transformed into the private chapel of Bernabò Visconti and his wife Regina Della Scala, Lord and Lady of Milan. After their deaths, it housed their burial site. In the 19th and 20th centuries, it was downsized and finally demolished. Only the crypt and part of the apse have been preserved and are today visible in Piazza Missori. Fragments of the frescoes decorating the walls and the burial monuments of Bernabò and his wife have been preserved and transferred to the Sforza Castle Civic Museums (Museo d'Arte Antica).

== History ==
=== Origins (5th–6th centuries) ===
The initial church had Paleochristian origins, dating back to the 5th century, with a single nave on a rectangular plan, 17 metres (56 feet) wide and about 35 m (115 ft) long. The early Christian origin was confirmed by the discovery in 1949 of a tomb along the wall of the first church, with frescoes on the external surface that go back to a period between the 5th and 6th centuries. The subsequent renovations do not seem to have changed the original perimeter of the initial church.

=== Romanesque era (12th–13th centuries) ===
In the second half of the 12th century, the church was almost demolished during the wars of Emperor Frederick Barbarossa against Milan and subsequently rebuilt in Romanesque style. The church internally assumed a three-aisled form covered with a gabled roof supported by exposed wooden trusses. The new presbytery and the apse elevated on a crypt supported by ten small columns. The painting of the Annunciation on the triumphal arch, partly preserved until the church's demolition, also belongs to the Romanesque period.

=== Private church of the Visconti house (14th century) ===
The church was transformed and embellished in the 14th century by Bernabò Visconti to convert it into a family mausoleum. He incorporated the church into the compound of the Visconti private buildings. The transept was transformed into an enclosed space, lighted by new windows on the two side walls. The church was decorated with a vast cycle of frescoes, probably painted in 1355–60, representing the stories of Saint John the Evangelist. A second cycle of frescoes, known from 16th-century sources, showed the brothers Bernabò and Galeazzo Visconti fulfilling a vow to the Saints Cosmas and Damian.

In 1363, Bernabò Visconti commissioned an equestrian statue representing him to Bonino da Campione, which he had installed in the apse above the central altar. In 1384, on the death of his wife, Regina Della Scala, Bernabò had her body placed in the church inside a sarcophagus built by the workshop of Bonino da Campione. When Bernabò died in 1385, for his sepulture, Bonino da Campione made a sarcophagus placed under the pre-existing equestrian statue.

=== Early modern era (16th–19th centuries) ===
After the end of the Visconti and Sforza period, in 1548, the church passed to the Carmelites, who administered the local parish. In 1783, the Josephist suppressions led to the deconsecration of the church and its secular use.

In 1814, the remains of Bernabò Visconti were moved to the nearby church of Sant'Alessandro, while the funeral monument was transferred to the archaeological museum of Brera and definitively placed in the Sforza Castle Civic Museums. Only later, in 1892, the same destiny was reserved for Regina Della Scala's remains which were removed and placed next to her husband. Her sarcophagus found a place near that of her husband.

The church, stripped of all its furnishings and works of artistic interest, was reduced to a shelter for cars and carts, then it became a workshop and finally a warehouse. The bell tower served initially as a signal tower in the Chappe telegraph line, created in 1805 to connect Paris and Milan. Later it was used as a meteorological observatory.

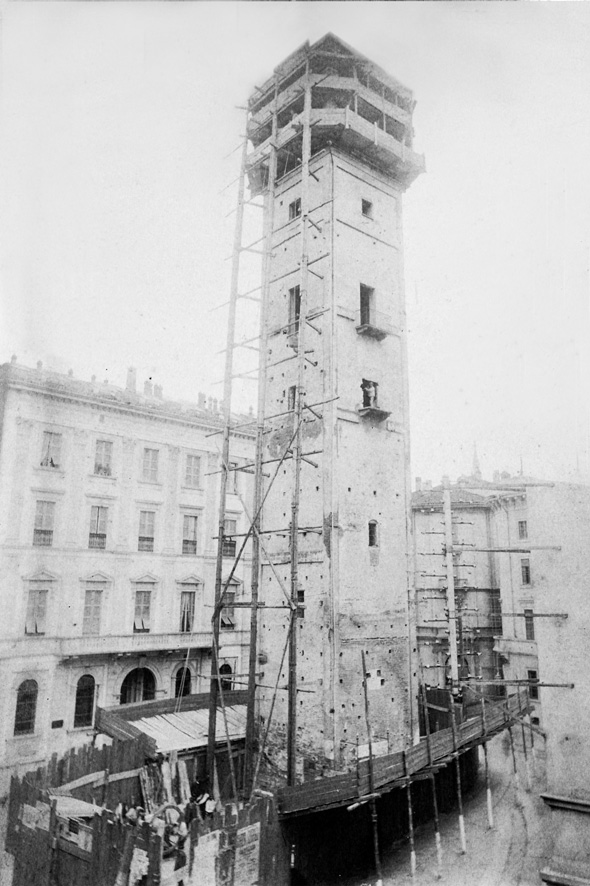
The bell tower in the days of its demolition

After the unification of Italy, the Municipality of Milan wanted to start an urban renewal plan in the city center. In 1877, the new Via Carlo Alberto, today Via Mazzini, required demolishing old houses and the church itself along the route. Despite the opposition of the institutions responsible for cultural heritage conservation, the municipal administration suddenly decided to demolish the front part of the church. The Waldensian Milanese community bought the surviving portion, undertaking the recovery of the ancient façade, which was dismantled and reassembled in the new position, oblique to the previous one. They consecrated the church in 1881.

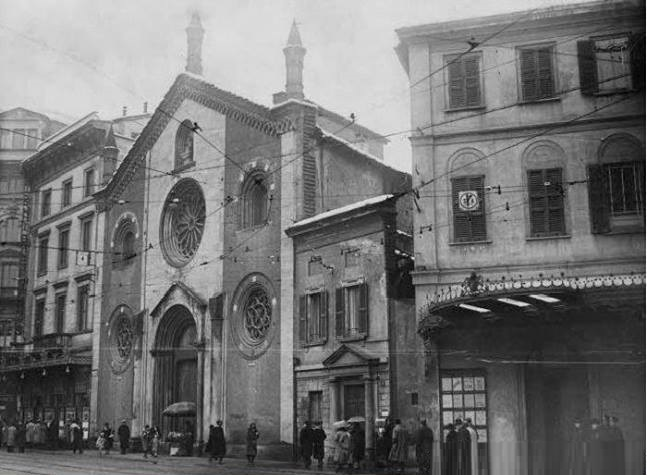
The façade rebuilt after the demolition of the front of the church

=== Final demolition (20th century) ===
The new regulatory plan of 1928–1934 imposed many changes on the city, such as the covering of the canals, also providing for the entire church demolition. The intervention was interrupted during the Second World War. In the post-war period, demolition began. During the works, frescoes appeared on the walls. Detached and transferred to canvas, they were moved to the Sforza Castle Museum. Eventually, the demolition was stopped, making it possible to save the last portion of the apse and the crypt below.

The statue in the niche at the top of the façade was also moved to the Sforza Castle Museum. The figure represents Saint John the Evangelist at the supposed ordeal. The church's name would have derived from the cauldron (Conca) where the saint would have entered.

The façade was removed and reassembled in the new Waldensian church in Milan, located in Via Francesco Sforza. The street adjacent to the church was named Via San Giovanni in Conca after the old church.

== Today ==
The underground crypt, which survived the demolition, can be visited in Piazza Missori under the vestige of the apse The façade is visible from Via Francesco Sforza in the newly built Waldesian church. The Sforza Castle Museum houses the funerary monuments of Bernabò Visconti and his wife Regina Della Scala, the statue of Saint John the Evangelist, and frescos discovered in the church during its demolition. The tombs with the remains of Bernabò Visconti and Regina Della Scala are in the nearby church of Sant'Alessandro near the entrance.

Bernabò Visconti's and Regina Della Scala's funeral monuments
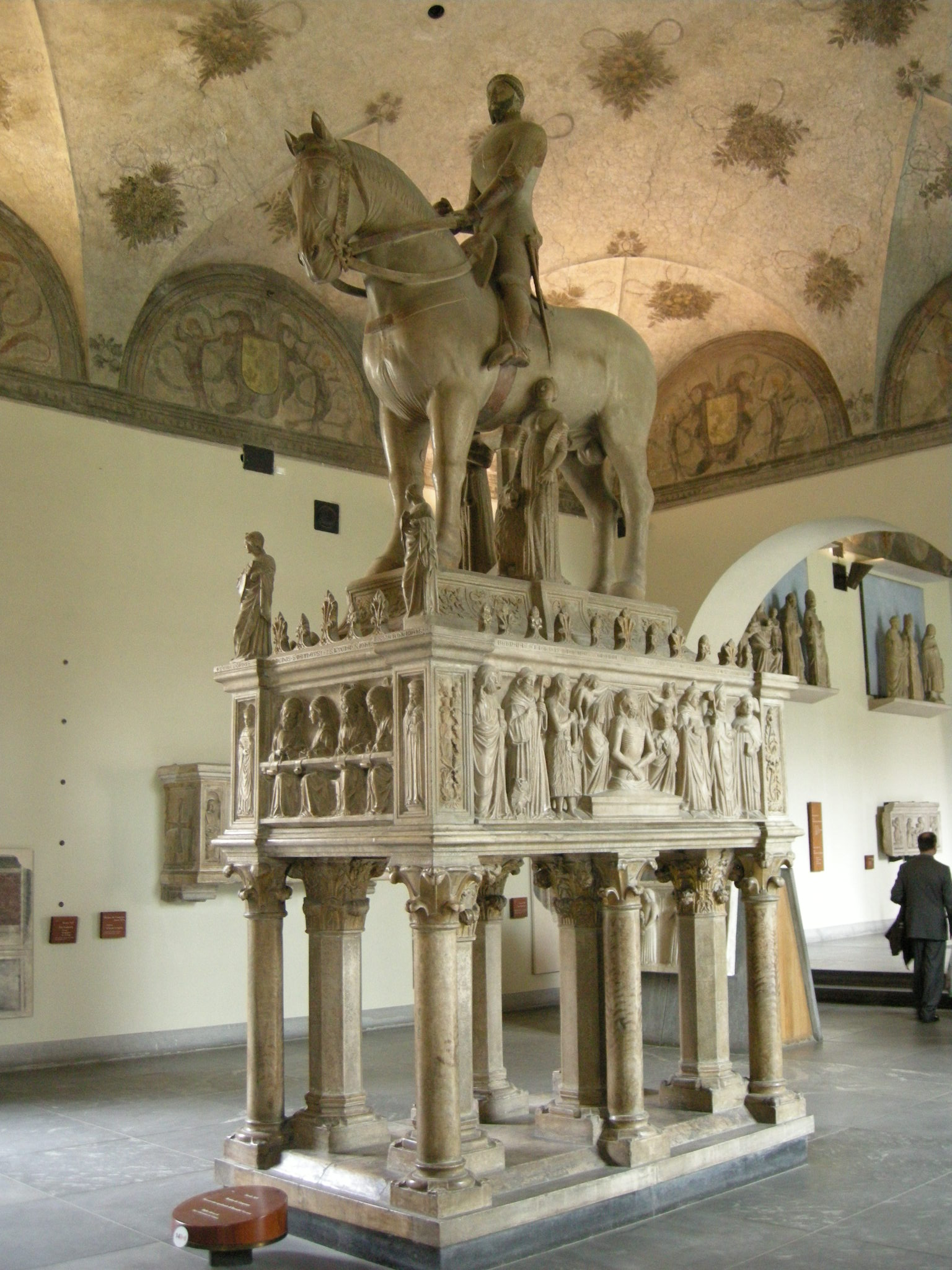
Bernabò Visconti's equestrian statue and sarcophagus

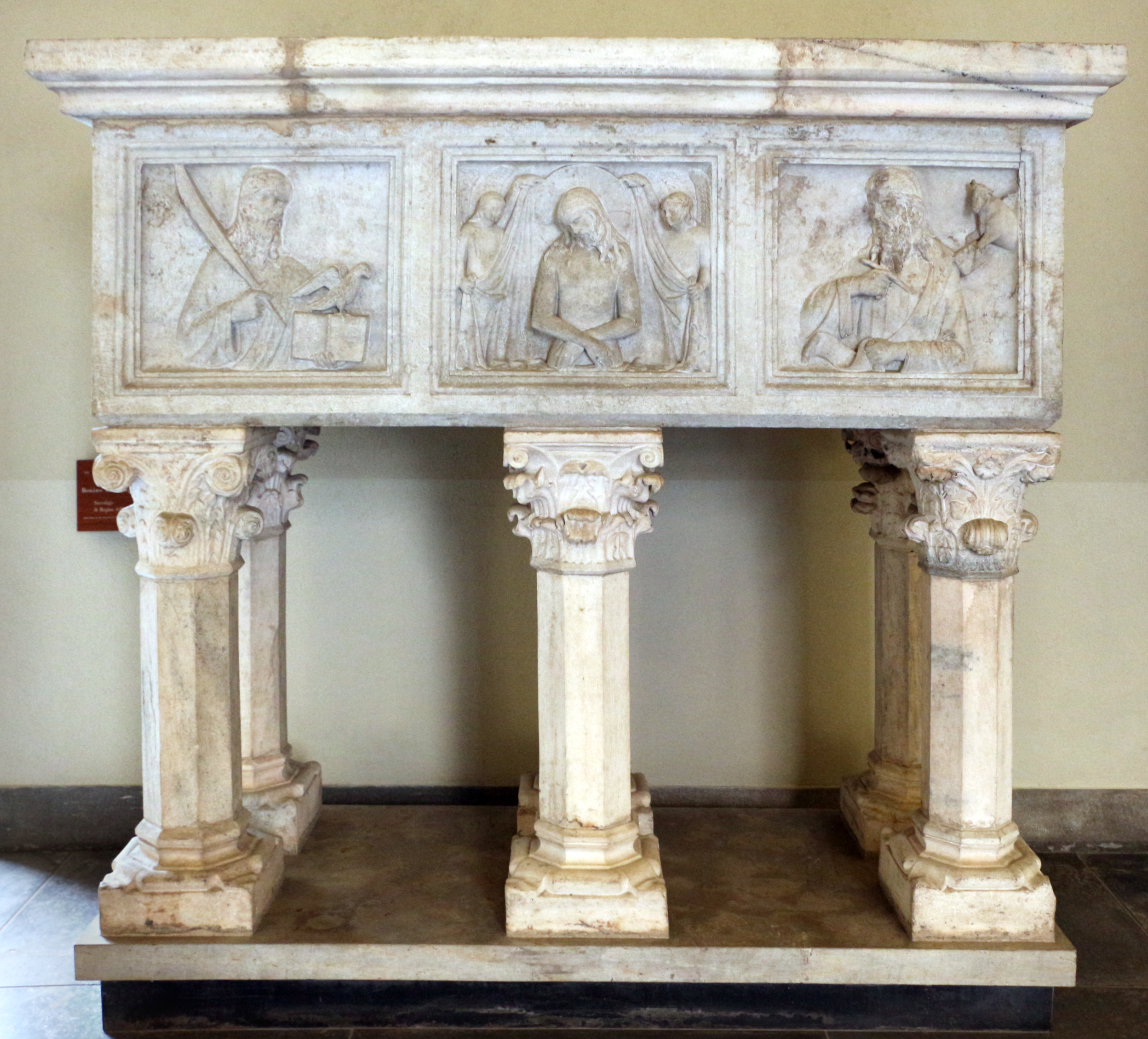
Regina della Scala's sarchophagus

== Sources ==
- Caciagli, Mario (1998). Milano, le chiese scomparse (in Italian). Vol. I. Milano: Civica Biblioteca d’Arte. OCLC 249727470.
- Cantù, Ignazio (1877). Milano diamante (in Italian). Milan, Naples: Francesco Pagnoni.
- Romano, Serena (2011). "Il modello visconteo: il caso di Bernabò". In Quintavalle, Arturo Carlo (ed.). Medioevo: i committenti. Atti del Convegno internazionale di studi. Parma, 21-26 settembre 2010 (in Italian). Milano: Electa. pp. 642–656. ISBN 9788837088750. OCLC 800798480.
- Rapelli, Paola (2011). Symbols of Power in Art. Los Angeles: J. Paul Getty Museum, Getty Publications. ISBN 9781606060667. OCLC 672300144.
- Vergani, Graziano Alfredo (2001). L'arca di Bernabò Visconti al Castello Sforzesco di Milano (in Italian). Milano: Silvana Editoriale. ISBN 9788882153847. OCLC 50948740.
