= Silvio Appiani =

Italian footballer

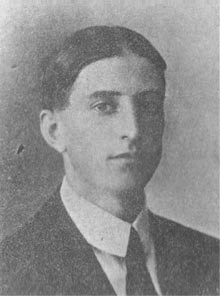

Personal information
- Date of birth: 4 May 1894
- Place of birth: Padua, Italy
- Date of death: 20 October 1915 (aged 21)
- Place of death: Kras, Italy
- Position: Forward

Senior career*
Years	Team	Apps	(Gls)
1913–1915	Padova	16	(18)
- * Club domestic league appearances and goals

Silvio Appiani (5 April 1894 – 20 October 1915) was an Italian football forward.

The Stadio Silvio Appiani in Padua was named after him.

== Career ==
Appiani made his debut on 4 May 1913 with Padova in the Campionato Veneto di Promozione. In the 1913–14 season, he played 2 games: against Petrarca and against Udinese. In 1914, Calcio Padova won the Campionato Veneto-Emiliano di Promozione and went to the Prima Categoria dell'Italia Settentrionale, reaching fourth place behind Vicenza, Hellas Verona and Venezia. Appiani was the driver and gunner of the team and scored 18 goals in 14 games. In 1915, he won the Coppa Veneta.

After enlisting in the army during World War I, Appiani died on 20 October 1915 on Kras at only 21 years old due to an Austrian bombardment.
