= Andrea Appiani the Younger =

Italian painter

Andrea Appiani, "the younger" (1817–1865) who was the great-nephew of the painter of the same name, was born in 1817. He studied in Rome under Minardi and Francesco Hayez, and became a good historical painter. He was employed by the King of Italy, the Emperor of Austria, and other personages of celebrity. Among his works may be mentioned Petrarch and Laura (1852); Laban and Jacob, and La povera Maria (1859). He died in 1865.
