= Niccolò Appiani =

Italian painter

Niccolò Appiani (or Appiano), a Milanese painter, who flourished about the year 1510. It is said that he was a scholar of Leonardo da Vinci, and Cesariani compares him with the greatest masters of the age. Two works in the Brera, the 'Baptism of Christ,' and the 'Adoration of the Magi,' are ascribed to Appiani.
