= Ambrogio Besozzi =

Italian painter (1648–1706)

17th-century portrait of Ambrogio Besozzi (Biblioteca Ambrosiana)

Ambrogio Besozzi or Giovanni Ambrogio Besozzi (1648–1706) was an Italian painter of the Baroque period.

== Life ==
He was born in Milan in 1648 where his first training was with Gioseffo Danedi, il Montalto. He assisted Ciro Ferri in Rome with work in quadratura and decoration. Probably prior to his trip to Rome he entered the Ambrosian Academy of painting, reopened in 1669 under the direction of Antonio Busca. According to Orlandi, he was known in Milan and Turin, but he must have worked also in Parma and in Venice. He painted oil and fresco, and was an expert copyist, an ornate painter and an elegant engraver.

He also painted for churches of Turin and Parma. He etched two plates: Portrait of Correggio and Apotheosis of a Princess in which the portrait was by Giovanni Battista Bonacina, the other part of the plate by Besozzi; after Cesare Fiori.

Besozzi died in Milan on 6 October 1706. He is buried in the church of Santa Maria presso San Satiro in Milan.
