= Andrea Lanzano =

Italian painter (1651–1709)

Andrea Lanzano (1651–1709) was an Italian painter of the late Baroque period.

He was initially trained in his native Milan under Luigi Scaramuccia, then traveled to Rome to work under Carlo Maratta. He became a follower of Giovanni Lanfranco. He was commissioned to help paint ceiling of the entry staircase of the palace of Hans-Adam I, Prince of Liechtenstein in Vienna. He was knighted by the emperor of the Austrian Empire.
