= Giovanni Bellati =

Italian painter

Giovanni Bellati (1750 – early 1800s) was an Italian painter active in the Neoclassic period. He was born in Valsassina. He studied in Milan at the Brera Academy, but then traveled to Rome.
