= Bernardo Racchetti =

Italian painter (1639–1702)

Bernardo Rachetti (1639–1702) was an Italian painter of the Baroque period, active as a painter of imaginary vedute.

He was born in Milan, the nephew and scholar of Giovanni Ghisolfi. He painted architectural views and perspectives (capricci) in the style of his instructor, for whose pictures Racchetti's are not infrequently mistaken. They usually represent seaports embellished with magnificent buildings.
