= Constantino da Vaprio =

Italian painter

Constantino da Vaprio (active 1453 - 1482) was an Italian painter of the Renaissance period.

== Biography ==
He was born to a Giovanni from a family known also as degli Zenoni (or Zenone), originally from Vaprio d'Adda. Sources state Costantino was either born in Milan or Pavia.

In 1453, he is documented as being patronized by the Duke Francesco Sforza. He is documented in 1461 as painting for the Pavia Cathedral. In 1475, he appears to share lodgings with Giacomino Vismara, Bonifacio Bembo, and Zanetto Bugatto in the parish of Santa Maria in Pertica, Pavia. Circa 1477, he was working with Vismara, Bembo and Vincenzo Foppa for a large ancona (no longer extant) to be placed in the chapel of the Castello Visconteo. Few works attributed to Costantino remain: including fragments of frescos from the church of Santa Chiara of Milan, and a Saint Monk in the Civic Museum of Lodi.
