= Coshocton Tribune =

Newspaper in Coshocton, Ohio

- Type: Daily newspaper
- Owner: USA Today Co.
- Editor: Pam James
- General manager: Rick Szabrak
- Founded: 1909; 117 years ago
- Headquarters: 550 Main Street Coshocton, Ohio
- Circulation: 3,800 daily 4,748 Sunday (as of 2013)
- Website: Coshocton Tribune

Coshocton Tribune is a daily newspaper that serves the community of Coshocton, Ohio, United States, and the surrounding Coshocton County.

== History ==
The Coshocton Tribune was founded in 1909 by William J. Bahmer, a former teacher. The paper was independently owned until 1960, when it was sold to Thompson Newspapers. In 2000, it was sold to Gannett.
