= Agustino Da Vaprio =

Italian painter

Agustino or Agostino Da Vaprio was an Italian painter of the Renaissance period. He was living in Pavia in the 15th century, and was one of the artists employed by Ludovico Sforza in Milan, in 1490. He is the author of an altar-piece in San Rimo, Pavia, a Virgin and Child with Saints and donor, dated 1499. A fresco lunette is now in the church of San Giacomo e Filippo, Pavia.
