= Giuseppe Appiani =

Italian painter

Giuseppe Appiani (1740 or 1754–1812) was an Italian painter of the Neoclassic periods. He was born in Vaprio d'Adda, near Milan, where he was mainly active. His parents moved to Monza, where his first mentor was the painter Giovanni Maria Gariboldi. At age 21, he moved to Milan, where he worked in the studios of Giorgi and later Giuliano Traballesi. He was active in the restoration of paintings. Another painter, Giuseppe Appiani (Porto, c. 1700-Triefenstein, c. 1785), was active in Germany.
