= Francesco Biondo =

Italian painter (1735-1805)

Francesco Biondi (1735–1805), or Anton Francesco Biondi, was an Italian Neoclassical painter, who was born and died in Milan. He painted sacred subjects, was a pupil of Andrea Porta, and painted a number of portraits for the Ospedale Maggiore of Milan.
