= Giovanni Agucchi =

Italian engraver

Giovanni Agucchi was an Italian engraver of the 16th century Renaissance period. He was a native of Milan. He is known for an engraving of the cathedral of Milan.
