= Cesare Poggi =

Italian painter

Cesare Poggi (1803–1859) was an Italian painter, active in the Neoclassic style of grand manner history depiction, mainly around his native city of Milan. He was a pupil of Luigi Sabatelli, but after 1824 studied in Venice and Rome. He died at Milan, where he became a member of the Academy of Painters.
