= Andrea Lanzani =

Italian painter

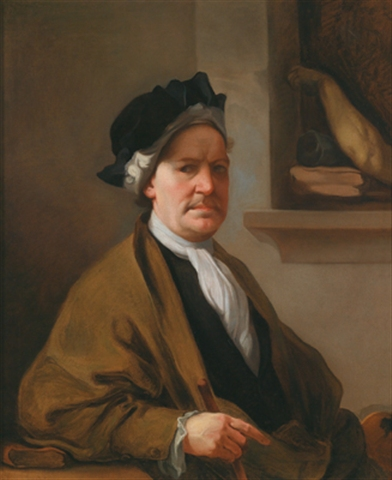
Self-portrait, oil on canvas. 71 x 87 cm.

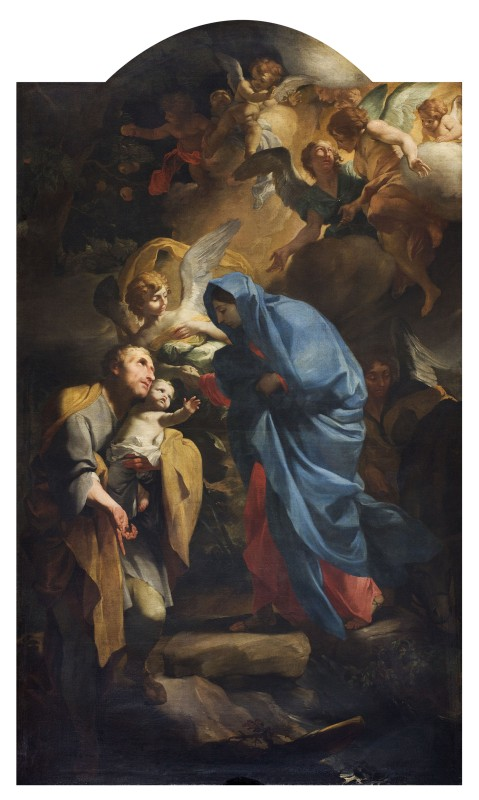
Holy Family, 1675

Andrea Lanzani (c. 1645 – 30 May 1712) was an Italian painter of the Baroque period.

== Biography ==
Born in Milan in 1641, Lanzani initially apprenticed in the workshop of Luigi Scaramuccia, where he met Andrea Pozzo, a marked influence on his early work. An immediate result of his enrolment at the reopened Ambrosian Academy 1669 was a large-scale depiction of the translation of the remains of Saint Calimerus, painted in 1670 and today in the Ambrosian Library. He made his first trip to Rome in 1674 where he studied under Carlo Maratta, but ten years later returned to Milan. He left Milan in 1697 to spend a year in Vienna, where he returned at the beginning of the new century and stayed for eight years. He had the opportunity during the latter period to work at the most illustrious courts of Central Europe for clients such as Prince Eugene of Savoy, Prince Adam von Liechtenstein and Count Kaunitz, as attested by major works such the frescoes in the Castle of Slavkov near Slavkov u Brna in the present day Czech Republic, and two canvases at the Schloss Galerie, Pommersfelden. He returned to Milan in 1708 and died there on 30 May 1712.

His painting of St. Carlo Borromeo is considered among his masterpieces.

== Other projects ==
Media related to Andrea Lanzani jr at Wikimedia Commons

- Faraglia, Rossella (2004). "LANZANI, Andrea". Dizionario Biografico degli Italiani (in Italian). Vol. 63: Labroca–Laterza. Rome: Istituto dell'Enciclopedia Italiana. ISBN 978-88-12-00032-6.
