= Jacob ben Jeremiah Mattithiah ha-Levi =

German translator

Jacob ben Jeremiah Mattithiah ha-Levi (Hebrew: יעקב בן ירמיהו מתתיהו הלוי; fl. 17th century) was a German translator.

He rendered Abraham Jagel's Leḳaḥ Ṭov into Yiddish (Amsterdam, 1675; Wilmersdorf, 1714; Jesnitz, 1719), as well as the Sefer ha-Yashar, under the title Tam ve-Yashar (Frankfurt, 1674). The latter work encompasses Biblical history from the era of Adam to the period of the Judges, with aggadic elaboration. Each paragraph was followed by a concise summary of the content and the moral implications of the respective narrative. Early editions also contained extracts from Abraham Zacuto's Sefer Yuḥasin and from Eleazar Askari's Sefer Ḥaredim.
