= Carpzov family =

Carpzov is the name of a family, many of whose members attained distinction in Saxony in the 17th and 18th centuries as jurists, theologians and statesmen.

== Origins ==
They were said to be descended from a Spanish family named Carpezano, who were driven from their country by religious persecution at the beginning of the 16th century. The family traced its origin to Simon Carpzov, who was burgomaster of Brandenburg in the middle of the 16th century.

== Members ==
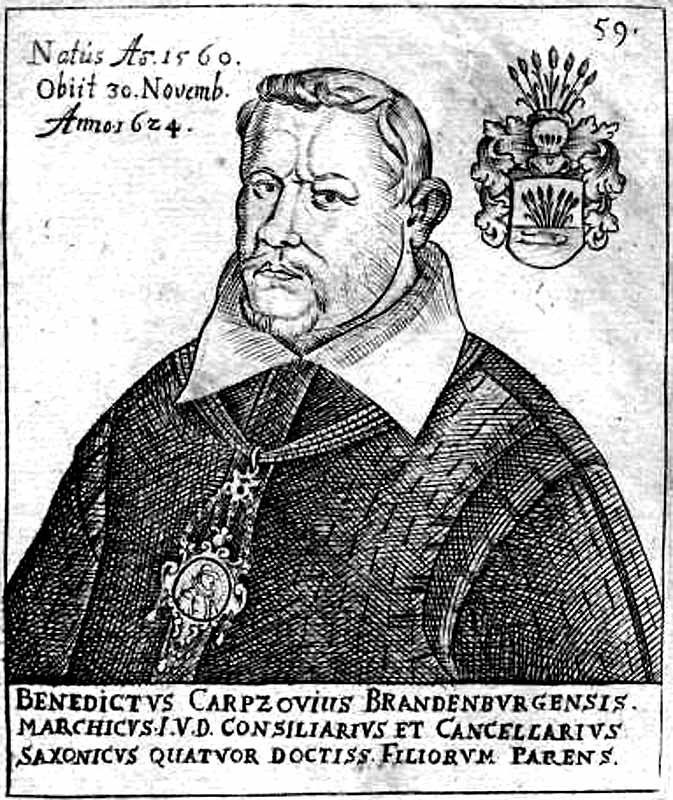
Benedikt Carpzov the elder

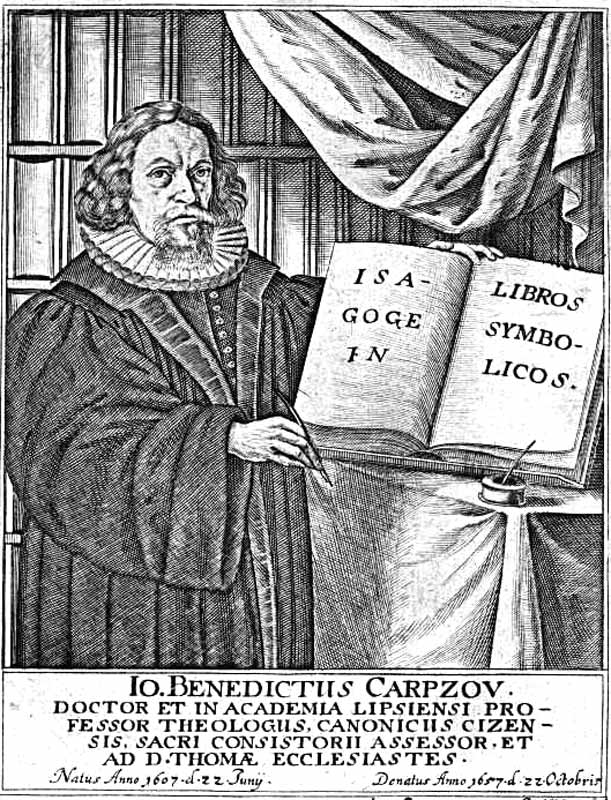
Johann Benedikt Carpzov I

Simon left two sons, Joachim Carpzov (d. 1628), master-general of the ordnance in the service of the Christian IV of Denmark, and Benedikt Carpzov (1565–1626), an eminent jurist who was professor of jurisprudence at Wittenberg, chancellor of the dowager electress Sophie, and again professor. Of Benedikt's five sons, his son Benedikt Jr. (1595–1666) is considered the founder of criminal jurisprudence in Germany, whose Practica nova Rerum Criminalium (Wittenberg, 1635; new ed. by Böhmer, 5 vols., Frankfurt am Main, 1758) and other works exerted great influence on the judiciary in Saxony and other countries; and his son Johann Benedikt (1607-1657) was professor of theology and preacher at Leipzig, and the author of Systema Theologiae (2 vols., Leipzig, 1653) and other works.

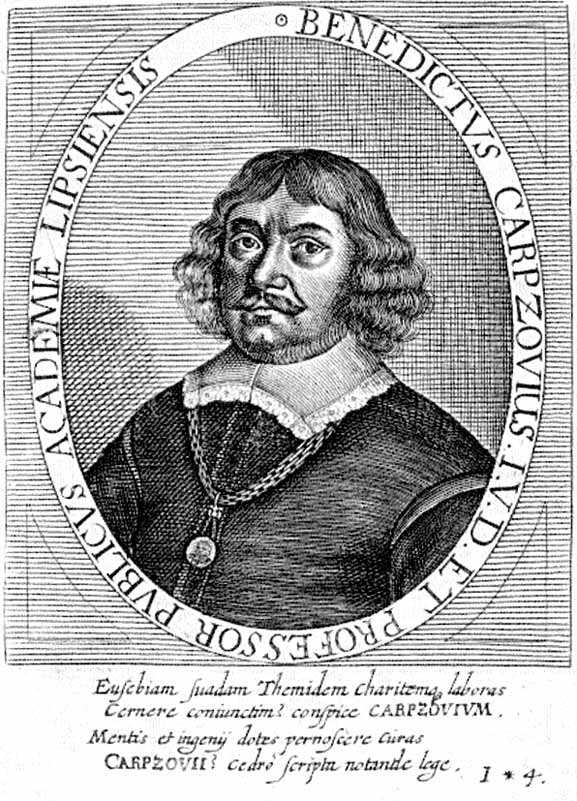
Benedikt Carpzov the younger

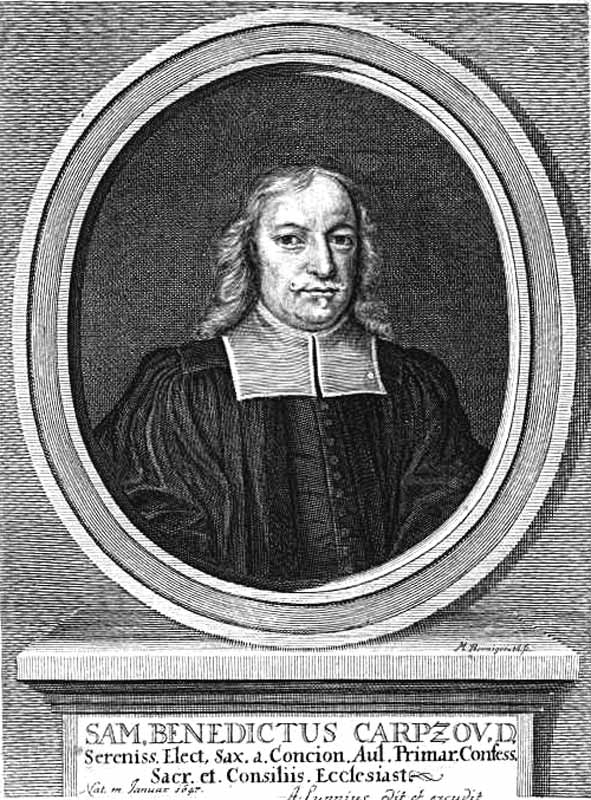
Samuel Benedikt Carpzov

Of Johann Benedikt's children, his son Johann Benedikt (1639-1699) was a Christian theologian and Hebraist, who published De Pontificum Hebraeorum Vestitu and other critical works; his son Friedrich Benedikt (1649-1699) was a collaborator in Mencke's Acta Eruditorum; and his son Samuel Benedikt (1647-1707) was professor of poetry and chief chaplain of the court of Saxony.

Samuel Benedikt's son Johann Gottlob Carpzov (1679-1767) was an eminent theologian and professor of oriental languages. Among the later members of the family, Johann Benedikt Carpzov (1720-1803) was successively professor of philosophy at Leipzig and of poetry and Greek philology at Helmstedt, and ended his life as an abbot after having taught theology. He occupied himself with philological labors, especially with grammatical commentaries on the New Testament.
