= Executive order =

Federal administrative instruction issued by a head of state or government

An executive order is a type of legal instrument issued by the executive branch of a government under authority granted by law. These instruments are in use in the countries of Liberia, Nigeria, the Philippines, and the United States. Hong Kong also has executive orders, and the president of India can issue ordinances.

In the United States, an executive order is a directive by the president of the United States that manages operations of the federal government. Executive orders are only binding on the federal government's executive branch. The legal or constitutional basis for executive orders has multiple sources. Article Two of the United States Constitution gives presidents broad executive and enforcement authority to use their discretion to determine how to enforce the law or to otherwise manage the resources and staff of the federal government's executive branch. The delegation of discretionary power to make such orders is required to be supported by either an expressed or implied congressional law, or the constitution itself. The vast majority of executive orders are proposed by federal agencies before being issued by the president. Like both legislative statutes and the regulations promulgated by government agencies, executive orders in the United States are subject to judicial review and may be overturned if the orders lack support by statute or the Constitution. Presidential executive orders, once issued, remain in force until they are canceled, revoked, adjudicated unlawful, or expire on their terms.

== Liberia ==
In 2014, President Ellen Johnson Sirleaf's Executive Order 65, which restricted mass gatherings in Monrovia during a period of special election, triggered strong backlash and a judicial stay. In 2024, President Joseph Boakai used executive orders to pursue anti-corruption and governance reforms, including an executive order establishing a task force to trace stolen state assets and another order creating a war crimes court.

== Nigeria ==
The Constitution of Nigeria does not define the exact power of executive orders, and their use in the country has been controversial. Initially, they were relatively little used in some parts of Nigeria, such as Lagos State. They became more visible federally under President Muhammadu Buhari's second administration, from 2017. By 2020, other state governors were also relying on them during the COVID-19 pandemic.

== Philippines ==
Executive orders (Filipino: Kautusang tagapagpaganap), according to Book III, Title I, Chapter II, Section 2 of Administrative Code of 1987, refer to the "Acts of the President providing for rules of a general or permanent character in implementation or execution of constitutional or statutory powers." Executive Order No. 292, which instituted the Administrative Code of 1987, is an example of an executive order.

== United States ==
The United States Constitution does not have a provision that explicitly permits the use of executive orders. With the exception of William Henry Harrison, all presidents since George Washington have issued what can be described as executive orders. The first such order was issued by Washington on June 8, 1789, addressed to the heads of the federal departments. The US Department of State instituted a numbering scheme in 1907, starting retroactively with United States Executive Order 1, issued on October 20, 1862, by Abraham Lincoln.

The U.S. Supreme Court has held that all executive orders must be supported by the Constitution. Attempts to block nonconforming orders have been successful at times. In 1935, the Supreme Court overturned five of Franklin Roosevelt's executive orders. The Court invalidated the executive order at issue in Youngstown Sheet & Tube Co. v. Sawyer: Truman had ordered private steel production facilities seized in Executive Order 10340 to support the Korean War effort. Congress has the power to overturn an executive order by passing legislation that invalidates it, and can also refuse to provide funding necessary to carry out certain policy measures contained with the order or legitimize policy mechanisms. In the case of the former, the president retains the power to veto such a decision, which the Congress may override with a two-thirds majority.

Harry S. Truman issued 907 executive orders, with 1,081 orders made by Theodore Roosevelt, 1,203 orders made by Calvin Coolidge, and 1,803 orders made by Woodrow Wilson. Franklin D. Roosevelt has the distinction of making a record 3,721 executive orders. In 2021, Joe Biden issued 42 executive orders in the first 100 days of his presidency, more than any other president since Truman. In 2025, Donald Trump became the president to issue the most executive orders in his first 100 days with 143, surpassing Franklin Roosevelt's 99.

Two extreme examples of an executive order are Franklin Roosevelt's Executive Order 6102 "forbidding the hoarding of gold coin, gold bullion, and gold certificates within the continental United States", and Executive Order 9066, which delegated military authority to remove any or all people in a military zone (used to target Japanese Americans, non-citizen Germans, and non-citizen Italians in certain regions). The order subsequently paved the way for all Japanese-Americans on the West Coast to be incarcerated in ten specially built prison camps for the duration of World War II. George W. Bush issued Executive Order 13233 in 2001, which restricted public access to the papers of former presidents. The order was criticized by the Society of American Archivists and other groups, who say it "violates both the spirit and letter of existing U.S. law on access to presidential papers". Barack Obama subsequently revoked the order in January 2009.

The degree to which the president has the power to use executive orders to set policy for independent federal agencies is disputed. Many orders specifically exempt independent agencies, but some do not. Executive Order 12866 has been a particular matter of controversy; it requires cost-benefit analysis for certain regulatory actions. Executive Order 12954, issued by Bill Clinton in 1995, attempted to prevent the federal government from contracting with organizations that had strike-breakers on the payroll: a federal appeals court ruled that the order conflicted with the National Labor Relations Act and overturned the order.

State executive orders, issued by American state governors, are usually based on existing constitutional or statutory powers of the governor and do not require any action by the state legislature to take effect.

== Hong Kong ==
Article 48(4) of Hong Kong's Basic Law empowers the Chief Executive to make executive orders but does not elaborate on the scope of this power or how it can be exercised, though the concept has been clarified by the courts in the years since 1997. Executive orders in Hong Kong are not legislation or law; they cannot create criminal offences, amend legislation, or impose obligations on members of the public, but they can bind civil servants and can be enforced through disciplinary action.

Executive orders are used sparingly in Hong Kong; the first executive order, the Public Service (Administration) Order 1997 (cited as Executive Order No. 1 of 1997), was issued in 1997 shortly after the Handover to replace the role of the Colonial Regulations in relation to the appointment, dismissal and discipline of public servants, with statutory references to the Colonial Regulations replaced with references to the Public Service (Administration) Order.

Given the status of the Colonial Regulations as imperial instruments made under the royal prerogative, there is some doubt as to whether executive orders are equivalent in scope and authority to the Colonial Regulations. While the Court of First Instance held in The Association of Expatriate Civil Servants of Hong Kong v Chief Executive [1998] 1 HKLRD 615 that executive orders are not law, it did not rule on whether executive orders are equivalent to the Colonial Regulations. If executive orders were to be considered law, it would confer on the Chief Executive a plenary legislative power, a breach of the principle of separation of powers.

A second controversy in relation to executive orders arose in 2005, when Chief Executive Donald Tsang issued the Law Enforcement (Covert Surveillance Procedures) Order to regulate covert surveillance conducted by law enforcement agencies, which had previously been regulated only by internal guidelines and was potentially in breach of the Basic Law Article 30 requirement that surveillance must be conducted "in accordance with legal procedures". While it was settled that executive orders were not law, the government asserted that an executive order would satisfy the "legal procedure" requirement laid down in the Basic Law.

== India ==
The President of India can issue ordinances under Article 123 when Parliament is not in session.

== See also ==
- Decree
- Delegated legislation
- Order in Council
- Ordonnance
