= Giulio Claro =

Italian jurist (1525–1575)

Doctor Giulio Claro
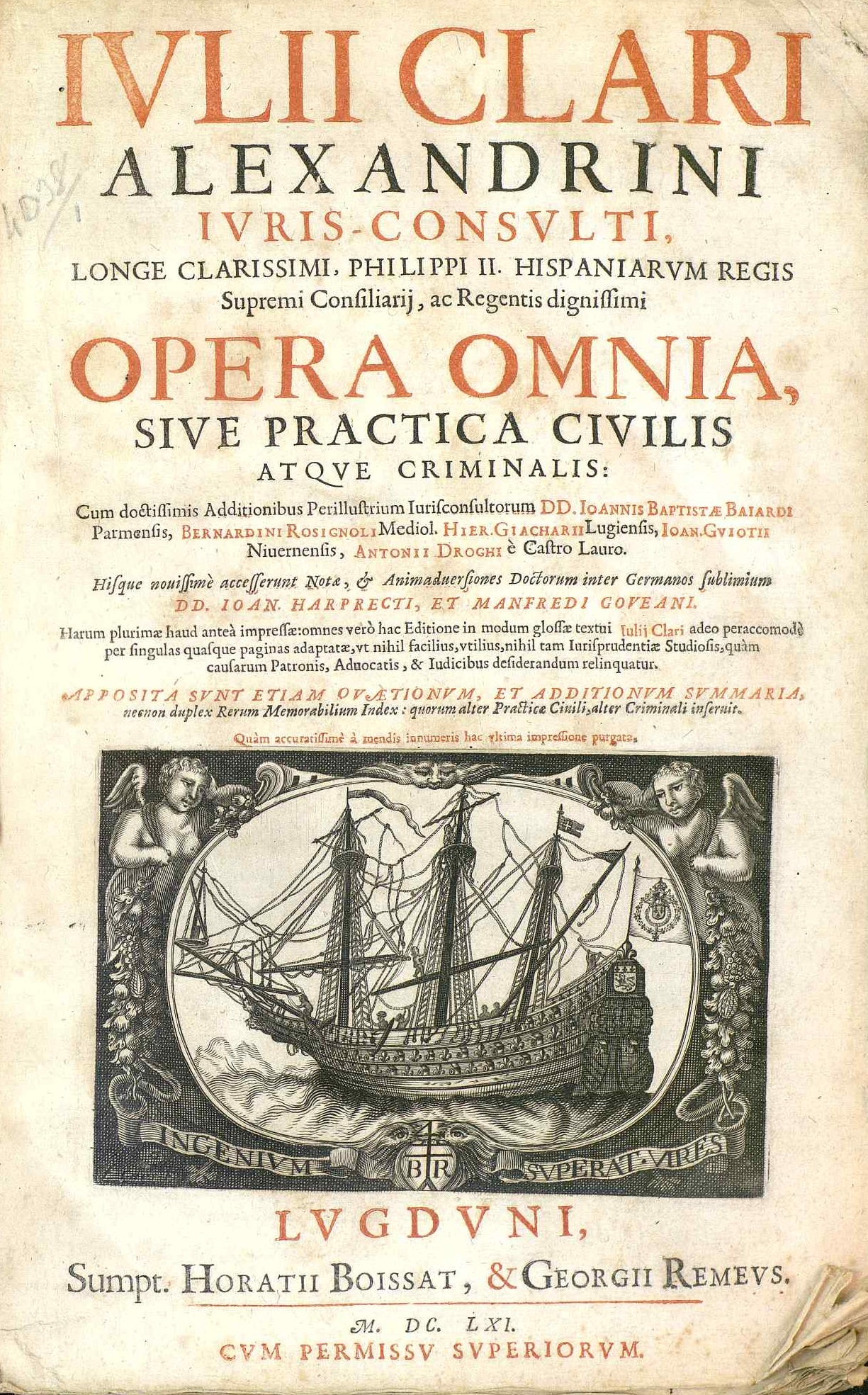
- Sententiae receptae, 1661 edition
- Born: January 6, 1525; Alessandria, Duchy of Milan
- Died: 13 April 1575 (aged 50); Cartagena, Spain
- Occupations: Jurist; Public official
- Parent(s): Giovanni Luigi Claro and Ippolita Claro (née Gambaruti)

Academic background
- Education: University of Pavia; University of Bologna
- Influences: Bartolus; Alciato; Deciani

Academic work
- Discipline: Criminologist, legal theorist, magistrate
- School or tradition: Mos italicus iura docendi
- Influenced: Farinacci, Carpzov, Spee, Beccaria

Giulio Claro or Clarus (Italian: [ˈdʒuːljo ˈklaːro]; 6 January 1525 – 13 April 1575) was an Italian Renaissance jurist and public official.

== Life ==
Giulio Claro was born on January 6, 1525 in Alessandria of a noble family. His father, Giovanni Luigi, was a prominent jurist and a member of the Senate of Milan.

Claro spent his youth between Alessandria and Milan. He studied law at the University of Pavia under Andrea Alciato, and took his doctor's degree in 1550.

After receiving his doctorate, Claro was appointed a Milanese Senator by Philip II in 1536, a royal pretor in Cremona in 1560/61, president of the Milanese Magistrato straordinario delle entrate in 1563 and regent of the Consejo d'Italia in Madrid in 1565.

== Work ==
Claro's work, together with that of Deciani and Farinacci, provided the theoretical foundation for the common criminal law of Europe. That common law held sway until it was attacked by Enlightenment legal critics such as Feuerbach and replaced by national penal codes in the 19th century.

Claro's principal work is the Liber V. Sententiarum, the fifth volume of his legal encyclopedia Sententia receptae. Dedicated to criminal law, it was reprinted as part of the Julii Clari Opera omnia as late as 1737.

== Editions ==
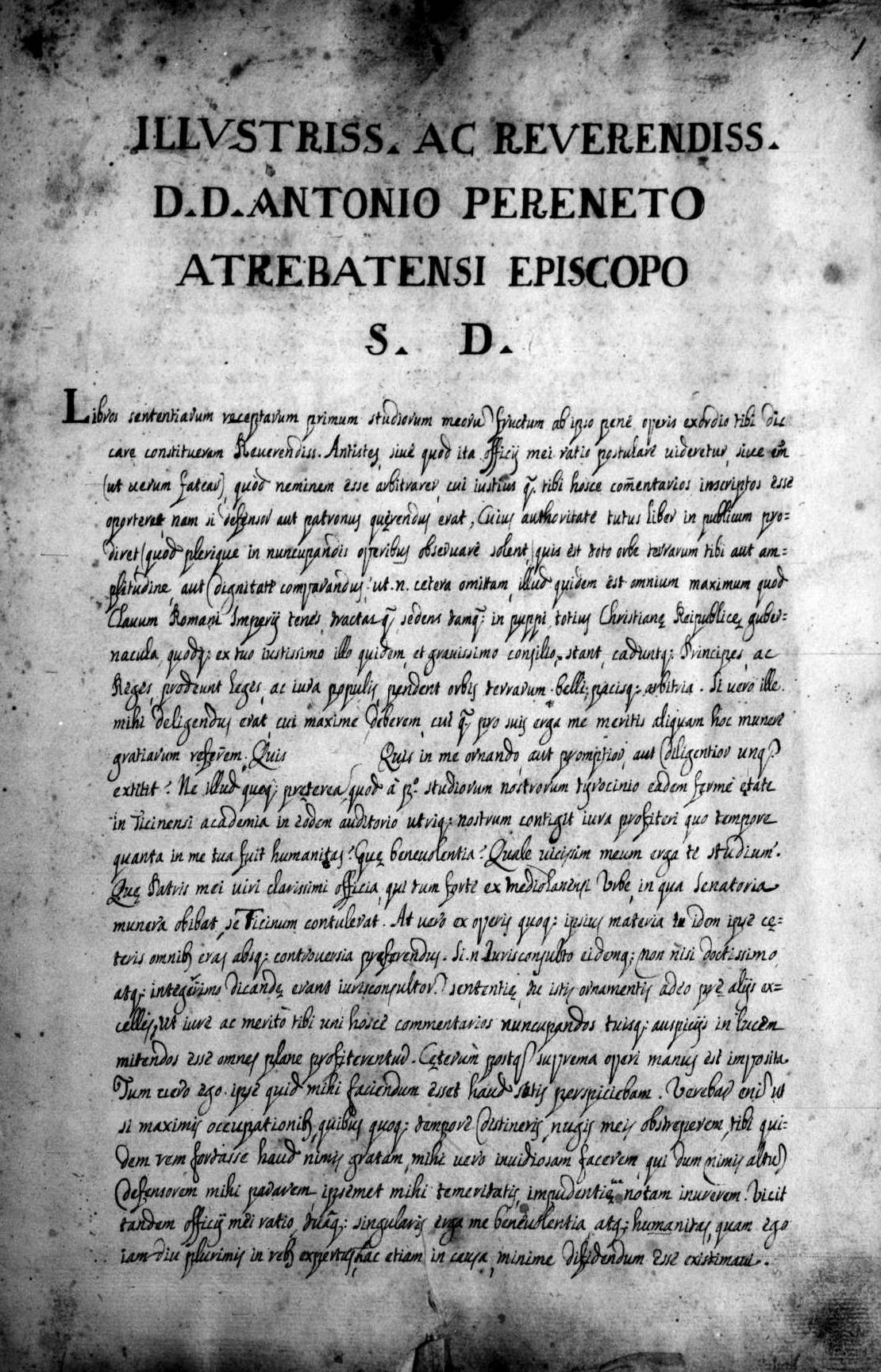
Libri sententiarum, 1555 manuscript. Biblioteca Ambrosiana, Milan.

- Sententiae receptae (in Latin). Lyon: Horace Boissat & George Remeus. 1661.

== Bibliography ==
- Holthöfer, Ernst (2001). "Claro, Giulio". In Michael Stolleis (ed.). Juristen: ein biographisches Lexikon; von der Antike bis zum 20. Jahrhundert (in German) (2nd ed.). München: Beck. p. 134. ISBN 3-406-45957-9.
- Ernst von Moeller (1911). Julius Clarus aus Alessandria: der Kriminalist des 16. Jahrhunderts, der Rat Philipps II., 1525-1575. A. Kurtze.
- Mazzacane, Aldo (1982). "CLARO, Giulio". Dizionario Biografico degli Italiani (in Italian). Vol. 26: Cironi–Collegno. Rome: Istituto dell'Enciclopedia Italiana. ISBN 978-88-12-00032-6.
