= Giulio I Arese =

Milanese nobleman and politician

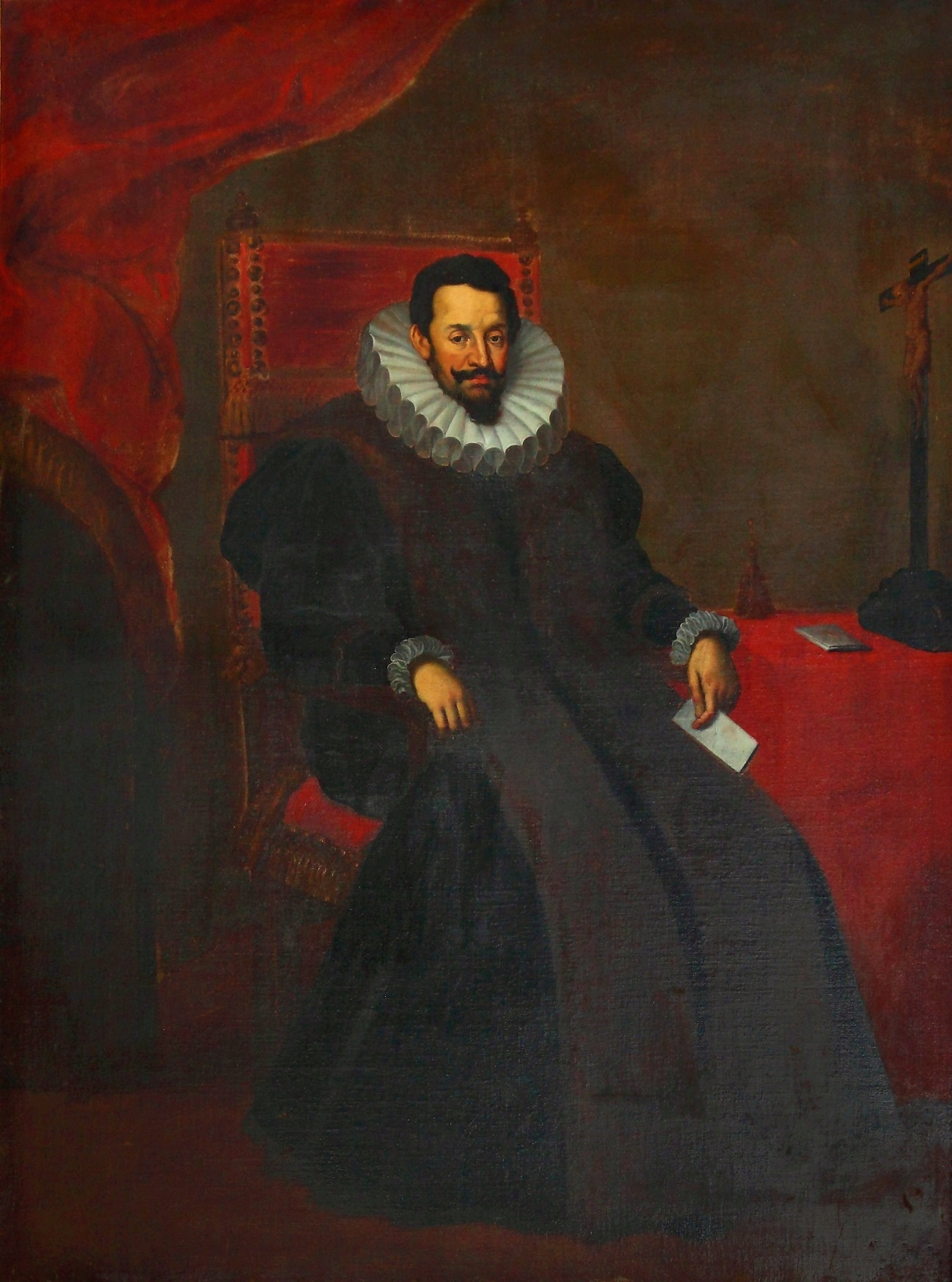
- Portrait of Giulio I Arese, Palazzo Arese Borromeo, Cesano Maderno

President of the Senate of Milan
- In office 31 January 1619 – 29 June 1627
- Preceded by: Giovanni Battista Trotti
- Succeeded by: Ottaviano Picenardi

Personal details
- Born: 1560 Milan, Duchy of Milan
- Died: 5 February 1627 (aged 66–67) Milan, Duchy of Milan
- Resting place: San Vittore al Corpo, Milan
- Spouse: Margherita Legnani
- Children: Bartolomeo III Arese
- Parent(s): Marco Antonio Arese; Ippolita Clari
- Education: University of Pavia
- Occupation: Politician; Jurist

Giulio I Arese (1560 – 5 February 1627) was a Milanese nobleman and politician, elected president of the Senate of Milan in 1619 under Phillip III.

The grandson of jurist Giulio Clari and member of the Arese family, he was a founding member of the Accademia degli Inquieti in Pavia in 1594. He is buried in San Vittore al Corpo, Milan.

== Sources ==
- Raponi, Nicola (1962). "ARESE, Giulio". Dizionario Biografico degli Italiani (in Italian). Vol. 4: Arconati–Bacaredda. Rome: Istituto dell'Enciclopedia Italiana. OCLC 883370.
- Calvi, Felice (1875). Il patriziato milanese secondo nuovi documenti deposti negli archivi pubblici e privati. Milan: A. Mosconi. pp. 149–161.
- Caizzi, Bruno (1958). "Le classi sociali nella vita milanese". Storia di Milano. Vol. XI: Il declino spagnolo. Milan: Fond. Treccani. p. 350.
- Crivelli Visconti, Vittorio Urbano. La nobiltà lombarda. Bologna: Forni. p. 73.
