= Prospero Farinacci =

Italian Renaissance jurist, lawyer and judge

Doctor Prospero Farinacci
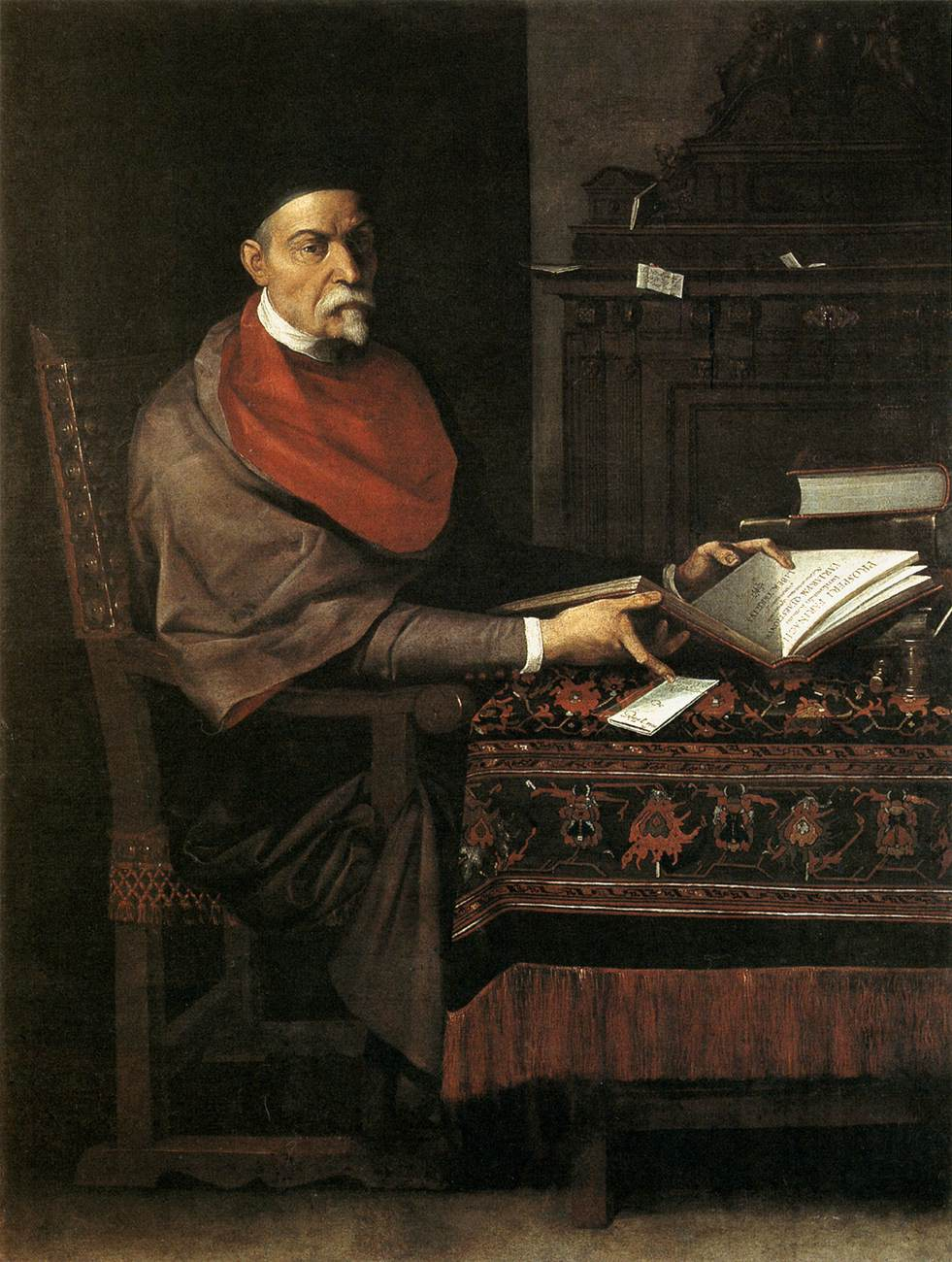
- Giuseppe Cesari called Cavalier D'Arpino, Portrait of Prospero Farinacci, 1607, oil on canvas (Museo nazionale di Castel Sant'Angelo, Rome, Italy)
- Born: November 1, 1544; Rome, Papal States
- Died: 31 December 1618 (aged 74); Rome, Papal States
- Resting place: San Silvestro al Quirinale
- Occupations: Jurist, lawyer, judge
- Known for: Praxis et Theorica Criminalis, one of the most influential works of criminal jurisprudence in Civil law countries until the reforms of Cesare Beccaria (1738–94).
- Children: Ludovico Farinacci
- Parent(s): Marcello Farinacci and Bernardina Farinacci

Academic background
- Education: Sapienza University of Rome; University of Perugia
- Academic advisors: Tobia Nonio; Rinaldo Ridolfi
- Influences: Bartolus de Saxoferrato; Tiberio Deciani; Giulio Claro

Academic work
- Discipline: Criminologist, legal theorist, criminal lawyer, defense attorney
- School or tradition: Mos italicus iura docendi

Prospero Farinacci (1 November 1544 – 31 December 1618) was an Italian Renaissance jurist, lawyer and judge. His Praxis et Theorica Criminalis (Practice and Theory of Criminal Law) was the strongest influence on criminal law in Civil law countries until the Age of Enlightenment. Farinacci defended Beatrice Cenci who was accused of killing her father in the most famous criminal case of the time. As a judge he was known for his harsh sentencing.

== Biography ==
The son of a Capitoline notary, Farinacci was born in Rome, in 1544. He studied law at La Sapienza in Rome, receiving his doctorate in 1567, at the early age of twenty-three. Prospero soon earned himself the reputation as an able advocate. In 1567, he became the general commissioner in the service of the Orsini family of Bracciano. He reached the height of his professional career as the Papal Datario (the officer of the Roman Curia who investigates candidates for papal benefices) under Pope Clement VIII (1592–1605). He went on to become Giureconsulto e Procuratore Fiscale della Camera Apostolica (Consulting Jurist and Tax Attorney for the papal Treasury) under Pope Paul V.

Along with this eminence, he was also a notoriously difficult character with quite a checkered private life. In 1570, he was imprisoned for an unknown crime. In 1582, he was stabbed in the face in a street fight, leaving him with a diagonal scar on the left cheek and a blind left eye. In 1584, he was jailed for the serious crime of bearing arms in public. Whilst he was a staunch prosecutor of sodomites, in 1595, he was himself accused of sodomy with Bernardino Rocchi, a sixteen-year-old page in the Palazzo Altemps, the house of his benefactor. He was excused of the crime by Pope Clement VIII, who famously made a pun on Farinacci's name (which alludes to "flour" in Italian) by claiming that "The flour is good, it's the bag that's bad."

Farinacci was perhaps most famous as the advocate in the scandalous trial for murder, actually patricide, of Beatrice Cenci and her relatives (1599), which ended in their gruesome public beheadings. He played a major role in the defense and although he was not able to save the girl, he did convince the pope to allow the youngest brother, Bernardo, to survive, invoking both the boy's young age and temporary mental infirmity as mitigating factors.

In 1600, Farinacci had a son with a prostitute called Cleria. Ludovico later joined the clergy and in the end, he became his father's sole heir. Prospero's portrait by Giuseppe Cesari can be found in the Museo nazionale di Castel Sant'Angelo.

== Works ==
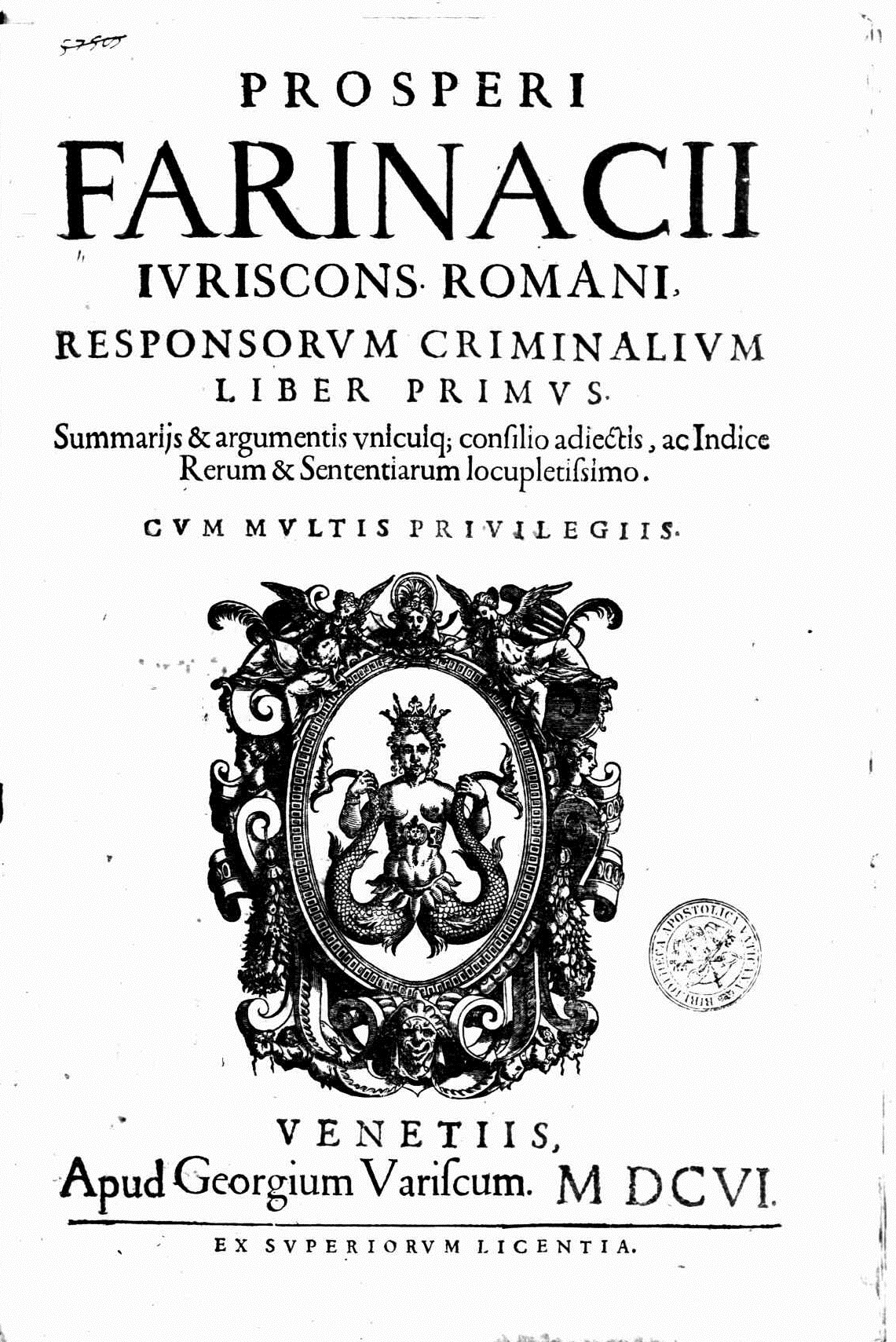
Responsa criminalia, 1606

Prospero Farinacci was best known for his legal decisions and opinions which he published in four massive tomes and many editions. His most important works are:

- Praxis et theorica criminalis, 1594–1614. Farinacci's Praxis et Theorica Criminalis exerted a very considerable influence on Western legal culture and became a fundamental reference point in Civil law countries in the modern era. The Praxis was also well known in customary law countries: Sir George Mackenzie of Rosehaugh, writing in Scotland in 1678, drew extensively on Farinacci. The Praxis is most noteworthy as the definitive work on the jurisprudence of torture. Farinacci devoted considerable attention to the use of torture in criminal trials and in general placed severe restrictions on its use.
- Responsa criminalia (in Latin). Vol. 1. Venice: Giorgio Varisco. 1606.
- Responsa criminalia. Vol. 2. Rome. 1615.
- Responsa criminalia. Vol. 3. Rome. 1620.
