= Johann Gottlob Carpzov =

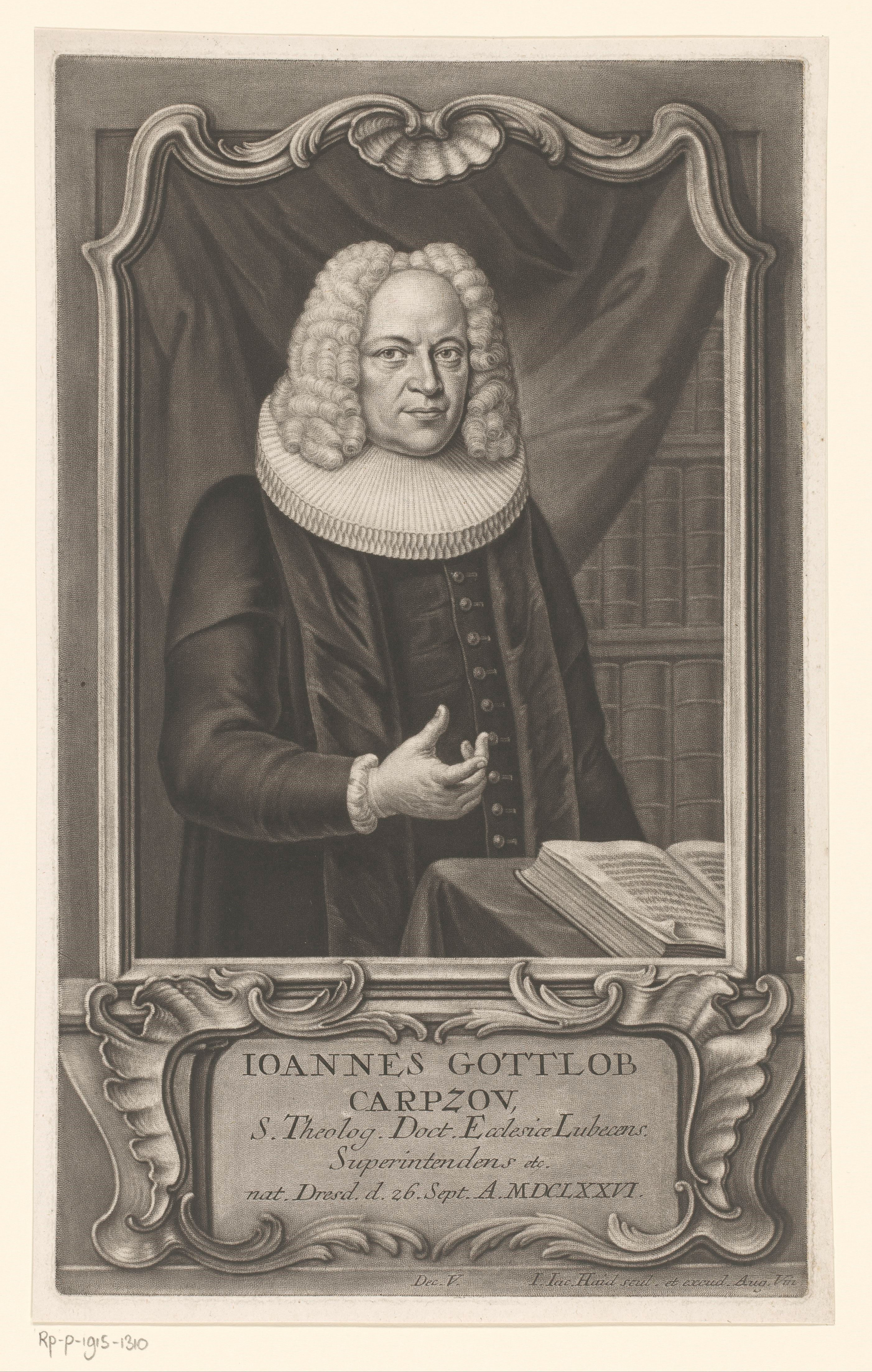
Johann Gottlob Carpzov.

Johann Gottlob Carpzov (26 September 1679, Dresden – 7 April 1767, Lübeck) was a German Christian Old Testament scholar, a nephew of Johann Benedict Carpzov II and a son of Samuel Benedict Carpzov. He was the most famous and most important Biblical scholar of the Carpzov family.

After attending universities at Wittenberg, Leipzig and Altdorf, he was titular professor of Oriental languages at Leipzig from 1719 to 1730, and preacher and theologian until his death. Like his uncle, he was an opponent of the Pietists. His critical works were: Introductio in libros canonicos bibliorum Veteris Testamenti 1721, 4th ed. 1757; Critica Sacra (I. Original text, II. Versions, III. Reply to Whiston), 1728; Apparatus Historico-Criticus Antiquitatum et Codicis Sacri et Gentis Hebrææ, 1748. The Apparatus is in the form of annotations to Thomas Goodwin's Moses and Aaron, and appended to it are dissertations on "The Synagogue Treated with Honor" (a statement of what the Christian Church has retained of ancient Jewish customs), on "The Charity System of the Ancient Jews" (discussion of the question whether צדקה in the Old Testament ever means "alms"), and others.

According to the Jewish Encyclopedia,

Carpzov represents both an advance and a retrogression in Biblical science — an advance in fullness of material and clearness of arrangement (his Introductio is the first work that deserves the name), and a retrogression in critical analysis, for he held fast to the literal inspiration of the Hebrew text of the Old Testament and bitterly opposed the freer positions of Simon, Spinoza, and Clericus. His antiquarian writings are still interesting and useful.
