= August Carpzov =

German jurist (1612–1683)

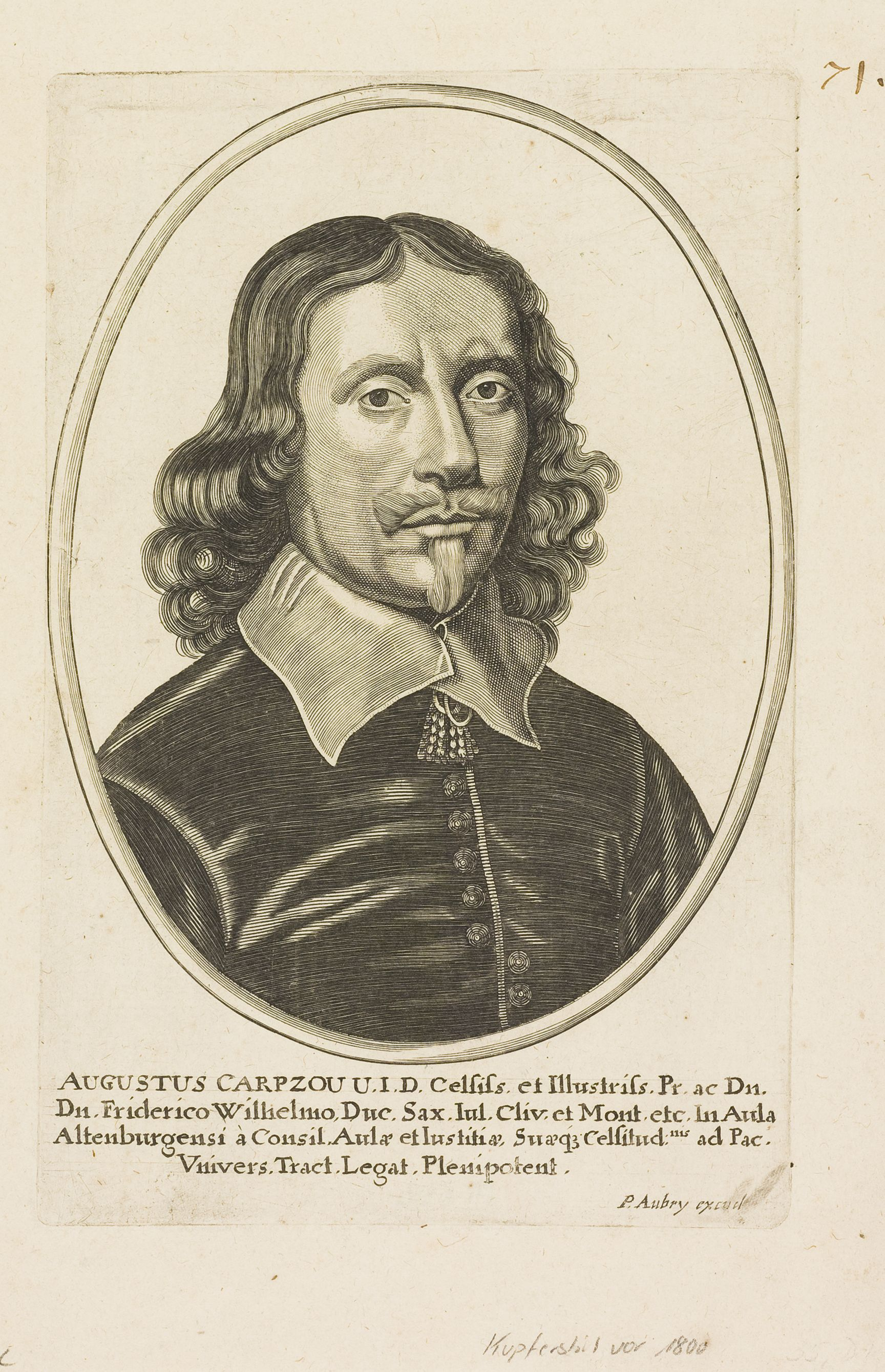
August Carpzov

August Carpzov (4 June 1612 – 19 November 1683) was a German diplomat. He was the fifth son of Benedikt Carpzov the elder.

Born in Colditz, he studied at the universities of Wittenberg, Leipzig and Jena, and in 1637 was appointed advocate of the court of justice (Hofgericht) at Wittenberg. Entering the service of Friedrich Wilhelm II, Duke of Saxe-Altenburg, he took part in the negotiations which led to the Peace of Westphalia in 1648, and was appointed chancellor by the duke in 1649. From 1672 to 1680 he was chief minister of Ernest I and Frederick I, dukes of Saxe-Coburg-Gotha, and died in Coburg on 19 November 1683.

August, who was a man of earnest piety, wrote Der gekreuzigte Jesus (1679) and some treatises on jurisprudence.
