= Law enforcement in Hong Kong =

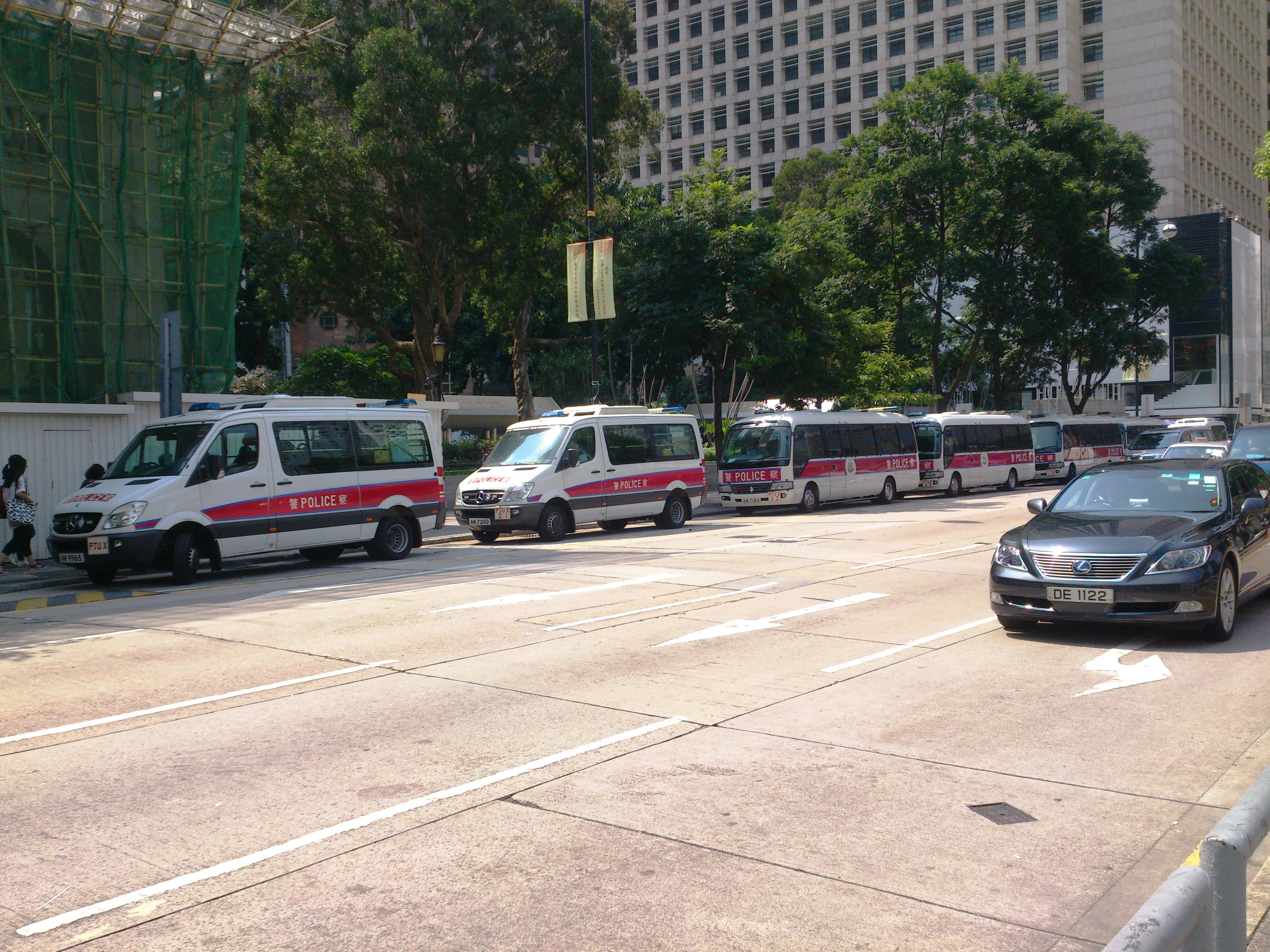
Police vehicles in Hong Kong

The main duties of law enforcement in Hong Kong are taken up by the Hong Kong Police Force. Other major law enforcement agencies (LEAs) include the Customs and Excise Department, the Independent Commission Against Corruption (ICAC), Hong Kong Correctional Services department, the Immigration Department. The Commissioner of the ICAC reports directly to the Chief Executive, and the heads of the other three agencies report to Secretary for Security.

Minor duties such as hawkers' regulation and anti-smoking are nevertheless assumed by officers of other government departments, including the Food and Environmental Hygiene Department, the Leisure and Cultural Services Department and the Housing Department. Compliance with fire safety requirements is overseen by the Fire Services Department.

Hong Kong criminal law is enforced through judgments of the courts.

== History ==
In 1844, the first Police Ordinance in Hong Kong was enacted and Royal Hong Kong Police Force was established. In 1997, following the Handover of Hong Kong, law enforcement fell under overall jurisdiction of China and the Royal Hong Kong Police Force became the Hong Kong Police Force.

The 2019–2020 Hong Kong protests and COVID-19 pandemic garnered global media attention on the role of law enforcement Hong Kong and highlighted issues with public trust of law enforcement.

In January 2024, a new regulation on Arrangement on Reciprocal Recognition and Enforcement of Judgments in Civil and Commercial Matters was enacted by the courts of mainland China and Hong Kong. The regulation establishes a mechanism for the reciprocal recognition and enforcement of all elegal judgments in civil and commercial matters between mainland China and Hong Kong.
