= Ferdinando Pulton =

English legal writer

Ferdinando Pulton (1536–1618) was an English legal writer, the first to attempt a comprehensive book treating criminal law. This was his De pace Regis et regni, first published in 1609.

Pulton belonged to Lincoln's Inn, but he was a Roman Catholic, so that at that time a legal career was denied to him. He was a student at Christ's College, University of Cambridge.

He wrote also a Collection of Sundrie Statutes (1618). This is credited with making the term Star Chamber common in use. Earlier works were his Abstract of all the Penal Statutes (1577) and A kalender, or table, comprehending the effect of all the statutes (1606).

He resided in Bourton, Buckinghamshire.
