= Abraham Yagel =

Italian Jewish catechist, philosopher, and cabalist

Abraham Yagel (Monselice 1553 – 1623) was an Italian Jewish catechist, philosopher, and cabalist. He lived successively at Luzzara, Venice, Ferrara, and Sassuolo.

== Life and identity ==
Giulio Bartolocci, followed by De Rossi, Wolf, and Julius Fürst, erroneously identified Abraham Yagel with the Christian censor Camillo Jagel, declaring that Abraham Jagel embraced Christianity and changed his name to "Camillo Jagel." The untenability of this identification has been proved by later scholars, including Hananiah Coèn.

Coèn's chief argument is that many books dated as early as 1611 bear the signature of "Inquisitor Camillo Jagel," while Abraham Yagel was known in 1615 as a pious Jew, as is shown by the following adventure related by himself. In 1615, he was captured by bandits soon after leaving Luzzara, between Reggio and Guastalla. His traveling companion, Raphael Modena, a rich Jew of Sassuolo, to whose house Yagel acted as family adviser, was captured with him. Yagel was sent back by the bandits to Modena's family for a ransom; the sum being too high, the rabbis and influential Jews of Modena came to his aid, and, supported by the duke and his brother, the cardinal, obtained Modena's liberty.

== Works ==
Many details of Yagel's life are given in his "Ge Ḥizzayon," the first part of which was published by Baruch Mani (Alexandria, 1880). It purports to be the relation of a dream in which he saw his deceased father, to whom he narrated the events of his life. After his father's death he went, an inexperienced youth, to Luzzara, where he became involved in an inheritance trial, and was thrown into prison. It seems that he was imprisoned for a considerable time, for he wrote there one of his important works.

Yagel was the author of the following works: "Leḳaḥ Ṭob," a catechism (Venice, 1587); "Moshia' Ḥosim," a treatise on curing the pest by prayer and fasting (Venice, 1587; this work is extant in manuscript under the title "Oraḥ Ḥayyim"; see Neubauer, "Cat. Bodl. Hebr. MSS." No. 2310, 1); "Eshet Ḥayil," on the virtues of a wife and her duties toward her husband (Venice, 1606); "Bet Ya'ar ha-Lebanon" (see below); "Be'er Sheba'," on the secular sciences; "Peri Megadim," not extant, but mentioned by Yagel in another work.

It is evident that Yagel endeavored to make his "Leḳaḥ Ṭob" conform to the catechisms then used by the Roman clergy; like the latter, he pointed out seven "cardinal sins" (), six other sins that are "hated by God," and four sins that themselves "cry out for vengeance." With the Roman clergy, he treats of the three virtues of faith, hope, and charity, and defines faith in the Christian sense. On the other hand, he deviates much from the Christian catechisms by omitting the Decalogue, lest the heretics say that the Torah is only the Decalogue (comp. Ber. 12a). Isaiah Horowitz, Yagel's contemporary, quotes in his "Shene Luḥot ha-Berit" (section "Gate of Letters," s.v. ) a long passage from the "Leḳaḥ Ṭob," treating of love toward one's neighbor. This work has been translated into Latin by Ludwig Veil (London, 1679), Carpzov (Leipsic, 1687), Odhelius (Frankfort-on-the-Oder, 1691), Hermann van der Hardt (Helmstädt, 1704), and Buxtorf (unpublished). A Judæo-German translation was made by Jacob b. Mattithiah Treves (Amsterdam, 1658), and was followed by three German translations—one by Bock (Leipsic, 1694), one from Van der Hardt's Latin translation (Jesnitz, 1722), and one by Karl Anton (Brunswick, 1756). An English translation from one of the Latin versions, called "The Jews' Catechism, Containing the Thirteen Articles of the Jewish Religion" was printed in London (1721).

"Bet Ya'ar ha-Lebanon," in four parts, discusses Cabala, metaphysics, and natural history. The thirtieth chapter of the second part was published by Reggio in his "Iggerot Yashar" (Vienna, 1834).
