= Criminal law =

Body of law that relates to crimes

Criminal law is the body of law that relates to crime. It proscribes conduct perceived as threatening, harmful, or otherwise endangering to the property, health, safety, and welfare of people, including oneself. Most criminal law is established by statute, which is to say that the laws are enacted by a legislature. Criminal law includes the punishment and rehabilitation of persons who violate such laws.

Criminal law varies according to jurisdiction, and differs from civil law, where emphasis is more on dispute resolutions or victim compensation, rather than on punishment or rehabilitation.

Criminal procedure is a formalized official activity that authenticates the fact of commission of a crime and authorizes punitive or rehabilitative treatment of the offender.

== History ==
The first civilizations generally did not distinguish between civil law and criminal law. The first written codes of law were designed by the Sumerians. Around 2100–2050 BC Ur-Nammu, the Neo-Sumerian king of Ur, enacted written legal code whose text has been discovered: the Code of Ur-Nammu although an earlier code of Urukagina of Lagash (2380–2360 BC) is also known to have existed. Another important early code was the Code of Hammurabi, which formed the core of Babylonian law. Only fragments of the early criminal laws of Ancient Greece have survived, e.g. those of Solon and Draco.

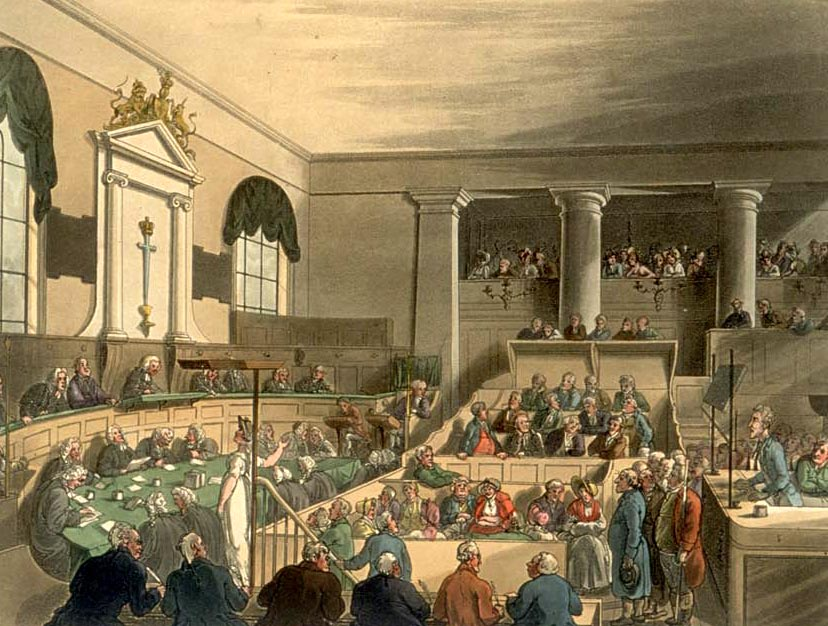
The Old Bailey in London (in 1808) was the venue for more than 100,000 criminal trials between 1674 and 1834, including all death penalty cases.

In Roman law, Gaius's Commentaries on the Twelve Tables also conflated the civil and criminal aspects, treating theft (furtum) as a tort. Assault and violent robbery were analogized to trespass as to property. Breach of such laws created an obligation of law or vinculum juris discharged by payment of monetary compensation or damages. The criminal law of imperial Rome is collected in Books 47–48 of the Digest. After the revival of Roman law in the 12th century, sixth-century Roman classifications and jurisprudence provided the foundations of the distinction between criminal and civil law in European law from then until the present time.

The first signs of the modern distinction between crimes and civil matters emerged during the Norman Invasion of England. The special notion of criminal penalty, at least concerning Europe, arose in Spanish Late Scholasticism (see Alfonso de Castro), when the theological notion of God's penalty (poena aeterna) that was inflicted solely for a guilty mind, became transfused into canon law first and, finally, to secular criminal law. Codifiers and architects of Early Modern criminal law were the German jurist Benedikt Carpzov (1595–1666), professor of law in Leipzig, and two Italians, the Roman judge and lawyer Prospero Farinacci (1544–1618) and the Piedmontese lawyer and statesman Giulio Claro (1525–1575).

The development of the state dispensing justice in a court clearly emerged in the eighteenth century when European countries began maintaining police services. From this point, criminal law formalized the mechanisms for enforcement, which allowed for its development as a discernible entity.

== Objectives of criminal law ==
Criminal law is distinctive for the uniquely serious, potential consequences or sanctions for failure to abide by its rules. Every crime is composed of criminal elements. Capital punishment may be imposed in some jurisdictions for the most serious crimes. Physical or corporal punishment may be imposed such as whipping or caning, although these punishments are prohibited in much of the world. Individuals may be incarcerated in prison or jail in a variety of conditions depending on the jurisdiction. Confinement may be solitary. Length of incarceration may vary from a day to life depending on the crime, criminal history, jurisdiction, court decision, and other factors. Government supervision may be imposed, including house arrest, and convicts may be required to conform to particularized guidelines as part of a parole or probation regimen. Fines also may be imposed, seizing money or property from a person convicted of a crime.

Five objectives are widely accepted for enforcement of the criminal law by punishments: retribution, deterrence, incapacitation, rehabilitation and restoration. Jurisdictions differ on the value to be placed on each.

- Retribution – Criminals ought to be punished in some way. This is the most widely seen goal. Criminals have taken improper advantage, or inflicted unfair detriment, upon others and consequently, the criminal law will put criminals at some unpleasant disadvantage to "balance the scales." People submit to the law to receive the right not to be murdered and if people contravene these laws, they surrender the rights granted to them by the law. Thus, one who murders may be executed himself. A related theory includes the idea of "righting the balance."
- Deterrence – Individual deterrence is aimed toward the specific offender. The aim is to impose a sufficient penalty to discourage the offender from criminal behavior. General deterrence aims at society at large. By imposing a penalty on those who commit offenses, other individuals are discouraged from committing those offenses.
- Incapacitation – The concept of keeping criminals away from society so that the public is protected from their misconduct. This is often achieved through prison sentences today, and sometimes the dissolution of companies.
- Rehabilitation – Aims at transforming an offender into a valuable member of society. Its primary goal is to prevent further offense by convincing the offender that his conduct was wrong.
- Restoration – This is a victim-oriented theory of punishment. The goal is to repair, through state authority, any injury inflicted upon the victim by the offender. For example, an embezzler will be required to repay the amount improperly acquired. Restoration is commonly combined with other main goals of criminal justice and is closely related to concepts in the civil law, i.e., returning the victim to their original position before the injury.

== Selected criminal laws ==
Many laws are enforced by threat of criminal punishment, and the range of the punishment varies with the jurisdiction. The scope of criminal law is too vast to catalog intelligently. Nevertheless, the following are some of the more typical aspects of criminal law.

=== Elements ===
The criminal law generally prohibits undesirable acts. Thus, proof of a crime requires proof of some act. Scholars label this the requirement of an actus reus or guilty act. Due to potentially severe consequences of criminal conviction, judges at common law also sought proof of an intent to do some bad thing, the mens rea or guilty mind. Some crimes – particularly modern regulatory offenses like safety crime – do not require mens rea, and they are known as strict liability offenses (E.g. Under the Road traffic Act 1988 it is a strict liability offence to drive a vehicle with an alcohol concentration above the prescribed limit). As to crimes of which both actus reus and mens rea are requirements, judges have concluded that the elements must be present at precisely the same moment and it is not enough that they occurred sequentially at different times.

=== Actus reus ===
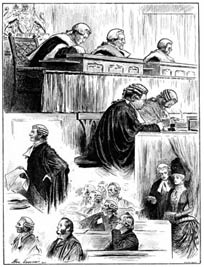
An English court room in 1886, with Lord Chief Justice Coleridge presiding

Actus reus is Latin for "guilty act" and is the physical element of committing a crime. It may be accomplished by an action, by threat of action, or exceptionally, by an omission to act, which is a legal duty to act. For example, the act of A striking B might suffice, or a parent's failure to give food to a young child also may provide the actus reus for a crime.

Where the actus reus is a failure to act, there must be a duty of care. A duty can arise through contract, a voluntary undertaking, a blood relation with whom one lives, and occasionally through one's official position. Duty also can arise from one's own creation of a dangerous situation. On the other hand, it was held in the U.K. that switching off the life support of someone in a persistent vegetative state is an omission to act and not criminal. Since discontinuation of power is not a voluntary act, not grossly negligent, and is in the patient's best interests, no crime takes place. In this case it was held that since a persistent vegetative state patient could not give or withhold consent to medical treatment, it was for the doctors to decide whether treatment was in the patient's best interest. It was reasonable for them to conclude that treatment was not in the patient's best interest, and should therefore be stopped, when there was no prospect of improvement. It has always been illegal to take active steps to cause or accelerate death, although in certain circumstances it was lawful to withhold life sustaining treatment, including feeding, without which the patient would die.

An actus reus may be nullified by an absence of causation. For example, a crime involves harm to a person, the person's action must be the but for cause and proximate cause of the harm. If more than one cause exists (e.g. harm comes at the hands of more than one culprit) the act must have "more than a slight or trifling link" to the harm.

Causation is not broken simply because a victim is particularly vulnerable. This is known as the thin skull rule. However, it may be broken by an intervening act (novus actus interveniens) of a third party, the victim's own conduct, or another unpredictable event. A mistake in medical treatment typically will not sever the chain, unless the mistakes are in themselves "so potent in causing death."

=== Mens rea ===
Mens rea is another Latin phrase, meaning "guilty mind". This is the mental element of a crime. A guilty mind refers to intention to commit some wrongful act or omission of a duty of care leading to an actus reus. Intention under criminal law is separate from a person's motive (although motive does not exist in Scots law).

A lower threshold of mens rea is satisfied with strict liability crimes arising from a failure of duty of care (see safety crime), as well as recklessness, whereby a defendant recognizes an act is dangerous but decides to commit it anyway. It is the mental state of mind of the person at the time the actus reus was committed. For instance, if C tears a gas meter from a wall to get the money inside, and knows this will let flammable gas escape into a neighbour's house, he could be liable for poisoning. Courts often consider whether the actor did recognize the danger, or alternatively ought to have recognized a risk. Of course, a requirement only that one ought to have recognized a danger (though he did not) is tantamount to erasing intent as a requirement. In this way, the importance of mens rea has been reduced in some areas of the criminal law but is obviously still an important part in the criminal system.

Wrongfulness of intent also may vary the seriousness of an offense and possibly reduce the punishment but this is not always the case. A killing committed with specific intent to kill or with conscious recognition that death or serious bodily harm will result, would be murder, whereas a killing effected by reckless acts lacking such a consciousness could be manslaughter. On the other hand, it matters not who is actually harmed through a defendant's actions. The doctrine of transferred malice means, for instance, that if a man intends to strike a person with his belt, but the belt bounces off and hits another, mens rea is transferred from the intended target to the person who actually was struck.[Note: The notion of transferred intent does not exist within Scots' Law. In Scotland, one would not be charged with assault due to transferred intent, but instead assault due to recklessness.

=== Strict liability ===
Strict liability can be described as criminal or civil liability notwithstanding the lack of mens rea or intent by the defendant. Not all crime requires intent, as some crimes have a reduced threshold of culpability or solely rely on the actus reus. For example, it might be sufficient to show that a defendant acted negligently in their duty of care, rather than intentionally or recklessly. In offenses of absolute liability, other than the prohibited act, it may not be necessary to show the act was intentional. Strict liability cases are often viewed as administrative or regulatory offences, rather than crimes of violence, due to the reduced threshold of culpability.

=== Fatal offenses ===
A murder, defined broadly, is an unlawful killing. Unlawful killing is probably the act most frequently targeted by the criminal law. In many jurisdictions, the crime of murder is divided into various gradations of severity, e.g., murder in the first degree, based on intent. Malice is a required element of murder. Manslaughter (Culpable Homicide in Scotland) is a lesser variety of killing committed in the absence of malice, brought about by strict liability, reasonable provocation, or diminished capacity. Involuntary manslaughter, where it is recognized, is a killing that lacks all but the most attenuated guilty intent, recklessness.

Settled insanity is a possible defense.

=== Personal offenses ===
Many criminal codes protect the physical integrity of the body. The crime of battery is traditionally understood as an unlawful touching, although this does not include everyday knocks and jolts to which people silently consent as the result of presence in a crowd. Creating a fear of imminent battery is an assault, and also may give rise to criminal liability. Non-consensual intercourse, or rape, is a particularly egregious form of battery.

=== Property offenses ===
Property often is protected by the criminal law. Trespassing is unlawful entry onto the real property of another. Many criminal codes provide penalties for conversion, embezzlement, and theft, all of which involve deprivations of the value of the property. Robbery is a theft by force. Other property crimes involve destruction or defacing of property like arson which is intentionally or willfully or recklessly burning a building down and vandalism which is deliberate criminal damage and defacement of an object or structure. Fraud in the UK is a breach of the Fraud Act 2006 by false representation, by failure to disclose information or by abuse of position.

=== Participatory offenses ===
Some criminal codes criminalize association with a criminal venture or involvement in criminality that does not actually come to fruition. Some examples are aiding, abetting, conspiracy, and attempt. However, in Scotland, the English concept of Aiding and Abetting is known as Art and Part Liability. See Glanville Williams, Textbook of Criminal Law, (London: Stevens & Sons, 1983); Glanville Williams, Criminal Law the General Part (London: Stevens & Sons, 1961).

=== Mala in se v. mala prohibita ===
While crimes are typically broken into degrees or classes to punish appropriately, all offenses can be divided into 'mala in se' and 'mala prohibita' laws. Both are Latin legal terms, mala in se meaning crimes that are thought to be inherently evil or morally wrong, and thus will be widely regarded as crimes regardless of jurisdiction. Mala in se offenses are felonies, property crimes, immoral acts and corrupt acts by public officials. Mala prohibita, on the other hand, refers to offenses that do not have wrongfulness associated with them. Parking in a restricted area, driving the wrong way down a one-way street, jaywalking or unlicensed fishing are examples of acts that are prohibited by statute, but without which are not considered wrong. Mala prohibita statutes are usually imposed strictly, as the mens rea component is not needed for punishment under those offenses, just the act itself.

== Criminal law jurisdictions ==
Jurisdictions in criminal law refers to the legal authority of the court to enforce laws and prosecute. It determines where the trial can take place, who can be tried, and for what crimes. Criminal Law Jurisdiction involves both national and international sources of law, some types include: 1. Territorial jurisdiction which is a court’s authority to preside over legal proceedings in a geographical area. 2. Extraterritorial jurisdiction where a state may prosecute crimes outside its territory if they affect national security. 3. Universal jurisdiction is the competence of a State to prosecute and punish the alleged perpetrators of certain offences, regardless of their location or the nationality of the perpetrators or victims.

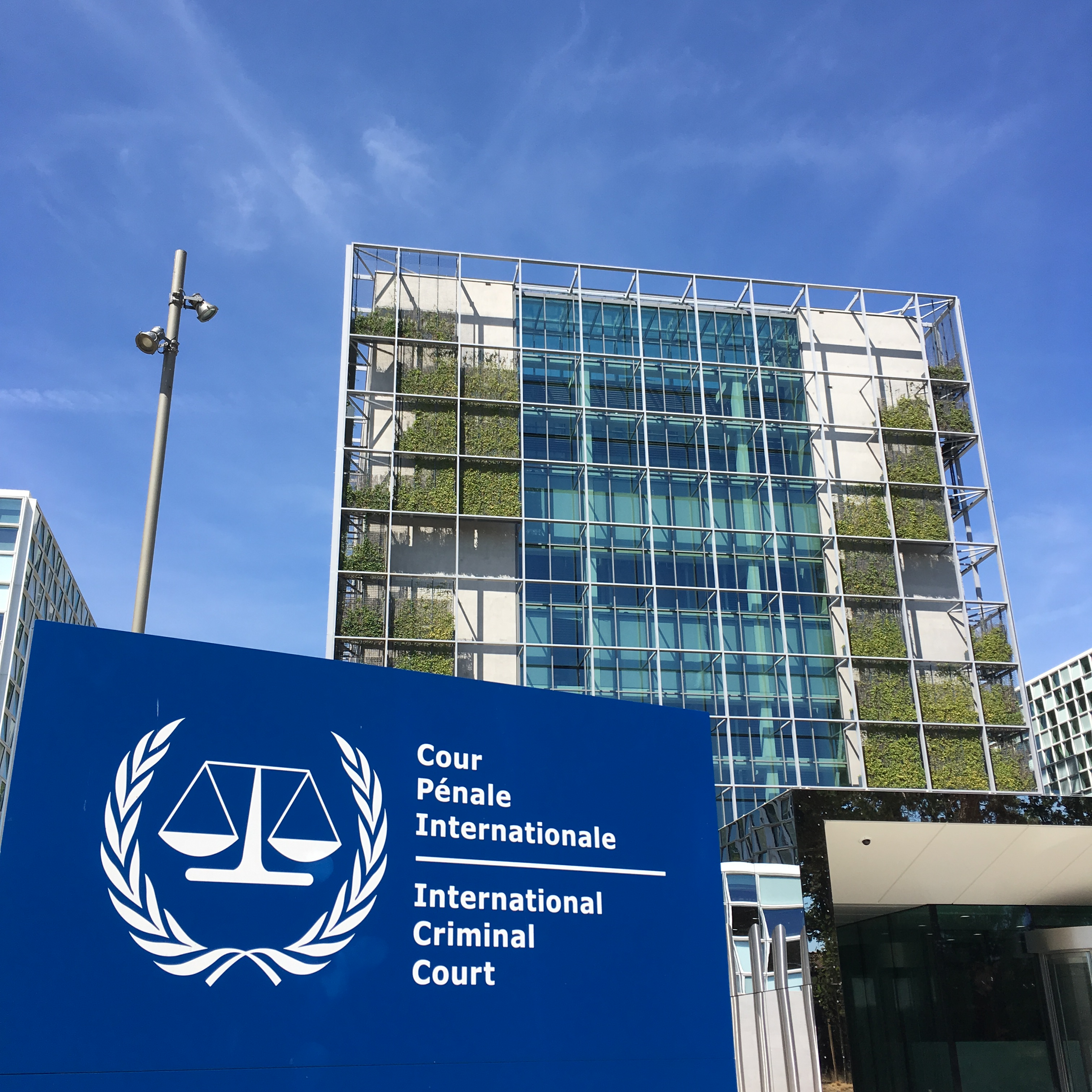
The exterior of the International Criminal Court's headquarters building in the Hague

Public international law deals extensively and increasingly with criminal conduct that is heinous and ghastly enough to affect entire societies and regions. The formative source of modern international criminal law was the Nuremberg trials following the Second World War in which the leaders of Nazism were prosecuted for their part in genocide and atrocities across Europe. The Nuremberg trials marked the beginning of criminal fault for individuals, where individuals acting on behalf of a government can be tried for violations of international law without the benefit of sovereign immunity. In 1998 an International criminal court was established in the Rome Statute.

== See also ==
- Administrative law – Branch of law governing administrative agencies
- Criminology – Field of studies related to crimes
- European Union law
- International law – Norms in international relations
- Legal socialization – Acquisition of attitudes to rule of law
- Martial law – Imposition of direct military control or suspension of civil law by a government
- Public criminology – Academic tendency within criminology

=== International criminal law ===
- Crimes against humanity – Concept in international law
- International criminal law – Body of public international law
- United States and the International Criminal Court – National relationship with the ICC
- Universal jurisdiction – Legal principle

=== National criminal law ===
- Australian criminal law
- Canadian criminal law
- Criminal Code of Russia – Prime source of criminal law in Russia
- Criminal law of Singapore
- Criminal law of the United States
- English criminal law – Legal system of England and Wales relating to crime
- French criminal law
- Hong Kong criminal law
- Bharatiya Nyaya Sanhita, 2023 – Penal code of the Republic of India
- Irish criminal law
- Northern Irish criminal law
- Penal Code of Romania – Romanian criminal code
- Philippine criminal law
- Scottish criminal law
- South African criminal law – Law relating to crime
- Strafgesetzbuch (Switzerland) – Swiss Criminal Code

=== Publications ===
- De pace Regis et regni, by Ferdinando Pulton, published 1609
