= Benedikt Carpzov the elder =

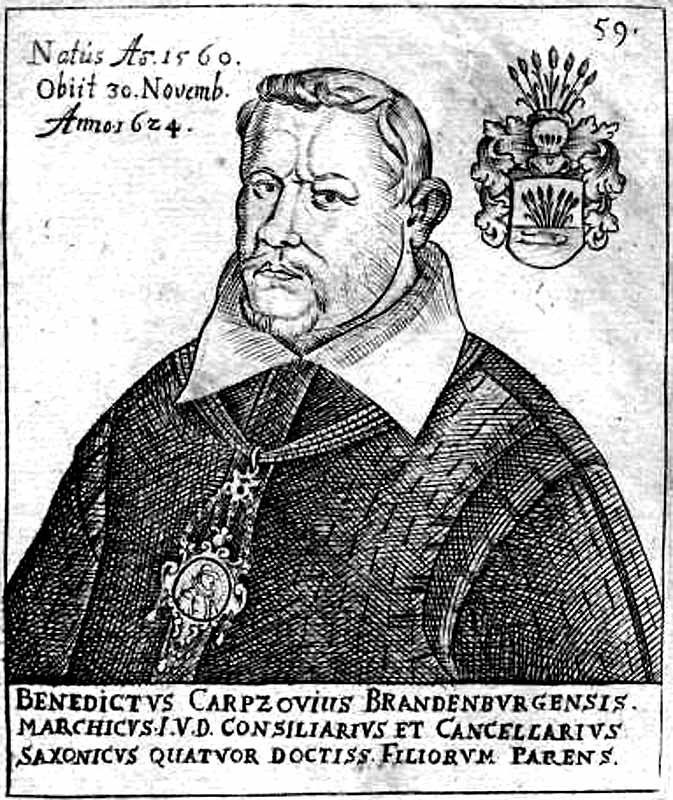
Painting of Benedikt Carpzov

Benedikt Carpzov (Brandenburg, 22 October 1565 – 1624) was a German legal scholar. After studying at Frankfort and Wittenberg, and visiting other German universities, he was made doctor of law at Wittenberg in 1590. He was admitted to the faculty of law in 1592, appointed professor of institutions in 1599, and promoted to the chair Digesti infortiati et novi in 1601. In 1602 he was summoned by Sophia, widow of the elector Christian I of Saxony, to her court at Colditz, as chancellor, and was at the same time appointed councillor of the court of appeal at Dresden. After the death of the electress in 1623 he returned to Wittenberg, and died there on 26 November 1624, leaving five sons. He published a collection of writings entitled Disputationes juridicae.

== Family ==
- Benedikt Carpzov Jr. (1595–1666), his second son, was also a lawyer.
- August Carpzov (1612–1683), his fifth son, was a Saxon diplomat.
