= Tiberio Deciani =

Italian jurist (1509–1582)

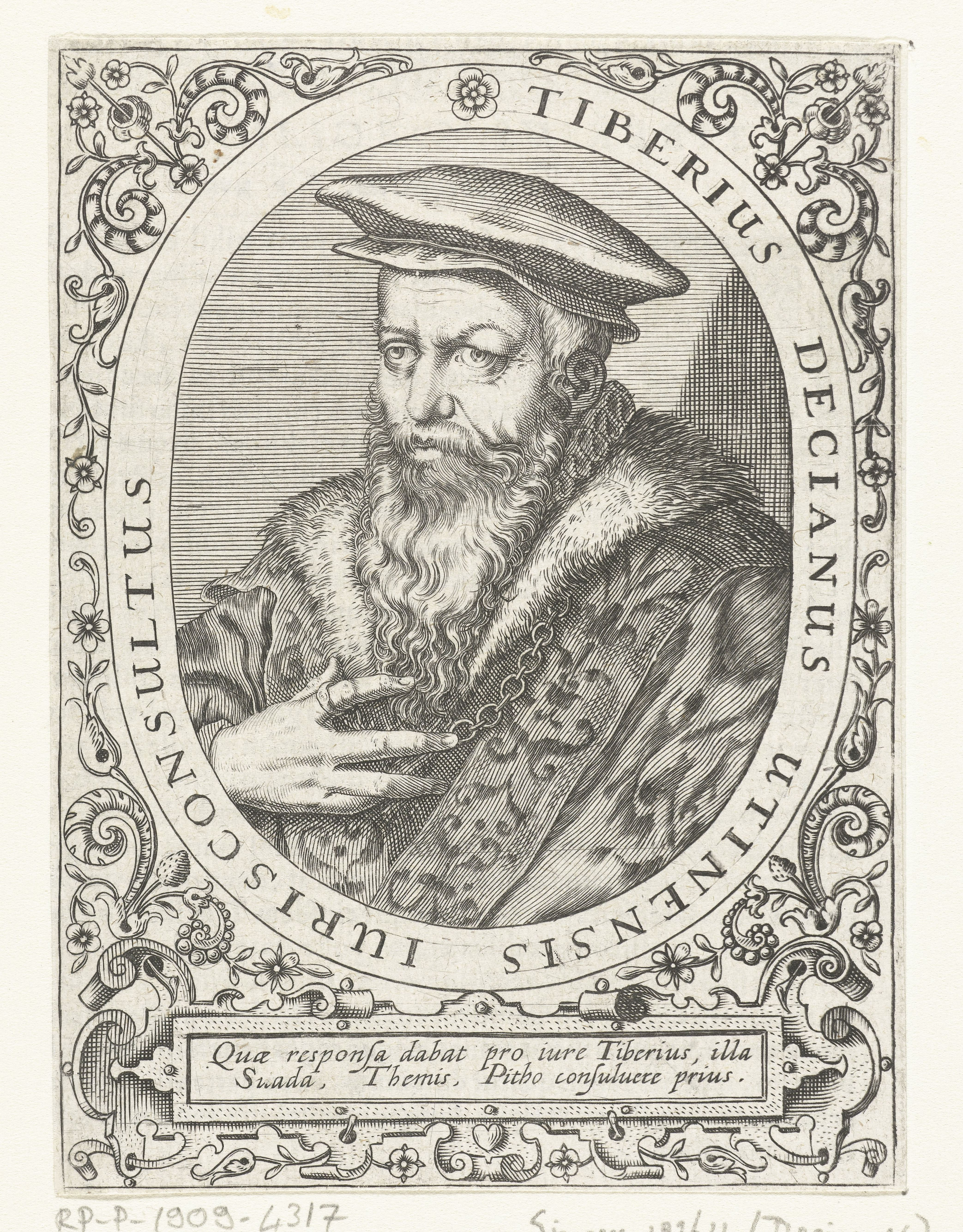
Portrait of Tiberio Deciani engraved by Cornelis Galle the Elder

Tiberio Deciani or Decianus (1509–1582) was an Italian jurist working in the tradition of Renaissance humanism.

Born in Udine, Deciani studied the humaniora and then law in Padua, where he attained a doctorate in 1529. He practiced law in Udine and became a member of the city council. In 1544, he moved his practice to Venice, and in 1547, he began to teach law at Padua.

Deciani's work was innovative in several fields that were at his time sparsely developed because they were outside the scope of the ius commune tradition. His most pioneering work was in criminal law. In his Tractatus criminalis (published posthumously 1590), he was the first author to discuss general principles of criminal law, i.e. matters beyond the treatment of individual crimes and stages of procedure. Notably, it includes the first formulation of the concepts of the objective and subjective constituent elements of a criminal act. These notions are, in the common law tradition, roughly equivalent to the criminal elements.

== Works ==
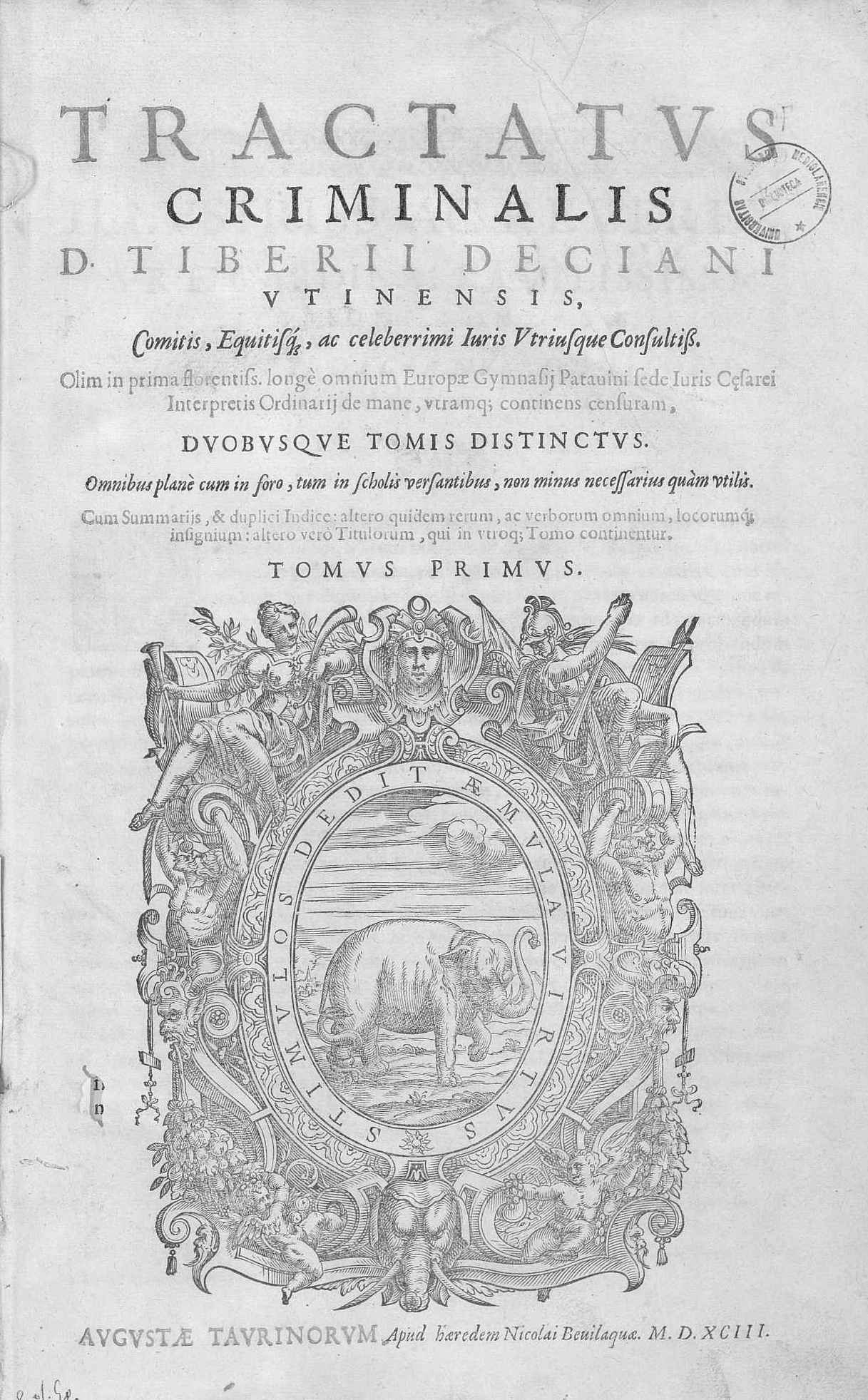
Tractatus criminalis, 1593

- Tractatus criminalis (in Latin). Vol. 1. Turin: eredi Nicolò Bevilacqua. 1593.
- Tractatus criminalis (in Latin). Vol. 2. Turin: eredi Nicolò Bevilacqua. 1593.
- Apologia pro iuris prudentibus (in Latin). Venetiis: apud Hieronymum & Ioannem Zenarios. 1579.
- Responsa (in Latin). Vol. 1. Venetiis: apud Hieronymum & Ioannem Zenarios. 1579.
- Responsa (in Latin). Vol. 2. Venetiis: apud Hieronymum & Ioannem Zenarios. 1579.
- Responsa (in Latin). Vol. 3. Venetiis: apud Hieronymum & Ioannem Zenarios. 1579.
- Responsa (in Latin). Vol. 4. Utinis: Natolinus typographus. 1594.
- Responsa (in Latin). Vol. 2. Utinis: Natolinus typographus. 1594.
