= Johann Benedict Carpzov II =

Johann Benedict Carpzov II (24 April 1639 – 23 March 1699) was a German Christian theologian and Hebraist. He was a member of the scholarly Carpzov family.

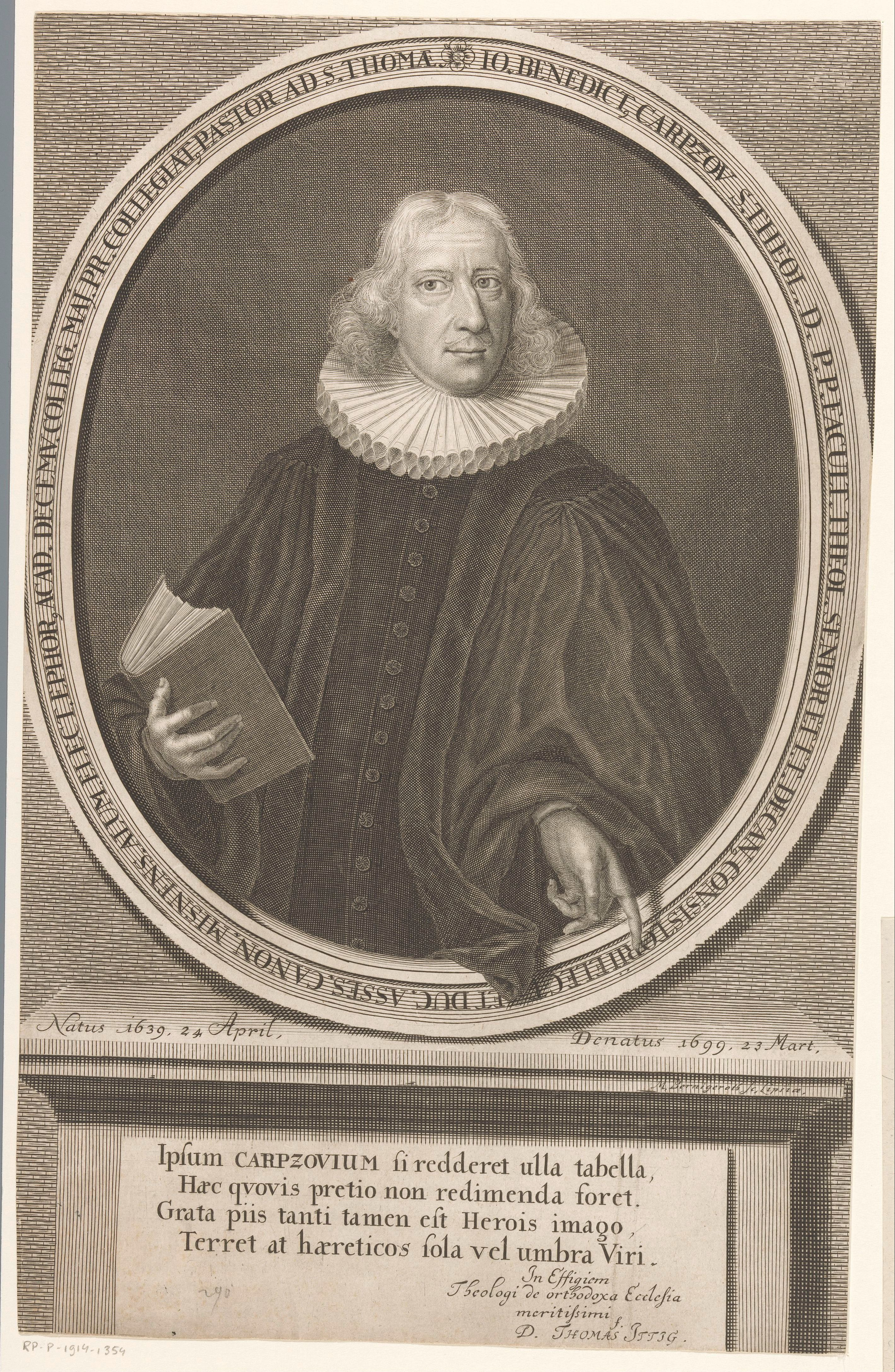
Johann Benedict Carpzov II.

He studied Hebrew under Johannes Buxtorf II, in Basel. He was appointed professor of Oriental languages at Leipzig in 1668, and was pastor of St. Thomas' 1679–99, and professor of theology 1684–99.

He edited in 1674 Wilhelm Schickard's Jus Regium Hebræorum, and, later, the Prophetas minores Commentarius of Johann Tarnow (Tarnovius), John Lightfoot's Horæ Heb. et Talmudicæ, Friedrich Lanckisch's Concordantiae Bibliorum Germanico-Hebraico-Graecae, and in 1687 the Pugio fidei adversus Mauros et Iudaeos of Raimundus Marti. To the last-named work he prefixed his own Introductio in Theologiam Judaicam.

Some dissertations by Carpzov were published (1699) by his brother Samuel Benedict Carpzov; and in 1703 appeared his Collegium Rabbinico-Biblicum in Libellum Ruth.
