= Codification =

Codification may refer to:

- Codification (law), the process of preparing and enacting a legal code
- Codification (linguistics), the process of selecting, developing and prescribing a model for standard language usage
- Accounting Standards Codification, the collection of US Generally Accepted Accounting Principles produced by the Financial Accounting Standards Board
- NATO Codification System, the official program under which equipment components and parts of the military supply systems are uniformly named, described and classified
- Codification of knowledge, a system-oriented method for creation of explicit knowledge
