= Hong Kong criminal law =

The general framework and the body of Hong Kong’s criminal laws were in fact imported from the United Kingdom, specifically English law, when Hong Kong was first become a Crown colony in 1842 under the Treaty of Nanking. Even nowadays, after the handover and years of development and modification, these laws are still very similar to those in the UK.

Just like in Britain, criminal laws in Hong Kong are entailed in different statutory law and common law.

Although an individual can initiate a criminal prosecution, this is very rare due to many reasons: expensive costs involved in legal proceedings, lack of power and information to carry out formal investigation and collect evidence, exclusive right for the Secretary for Justice to get involved or even take over any private criminal prosecution, etc. Therefore, it is the Secretary for Justice who normally initiates a formal criminal prosecution. Before the Secretary initiates a prosecution, the Secretary must first determine (1) if there is enough evidence to provide an adequate basis to prosecute, and (2) whether the prosecution is to benefit the society as a whole. The Secretary, or officials acting upon his behalf, is required to follow a set of rules in a prosecution. The Secretary is then to present the case and any evidence to an impartial court. The defendant of the case is allowed to defense him in the court proceeding. At last, the court determines whether or not the defendant is guilty; accordingly, the court will also give appropriate remedies and orders. Therefore, criminal law can further divide into procedure law, substantive law, and judgement.

== Procedural law ==
During a criminal proceeding, many steps and rules are involved. Each of the steps must be finished and followed in the correct order and the right time. First things first, in order for the Secretary for Justice to institute a criminal proceeding, the Secretary must first lawfully collect evidence and arrest the accused person. Then, the Secretary determines whether to institute a criminal proceeding; if he does so, he should also determine which court he should bring case to for formal hearing.

=== Lawful Search, Seizure, and Arrest ===
See Arrest powers in Hong Kong

=== Laying Charges, Indictable or Summary Case, and Court Choice ===
See Summary Proceedings

=== Pre-trial ===
See Trial First Stage

=== Trial ===
- Voir Dire
- Empanelling jury

Similar to many former British colonies, Hong Kong inherits the practice of trial by jury from the UK. The precise process of empanelling a jury is provided in the Jury Ordinance. In general, a jury is composed of seven jurors. Sometimes, a judge may enlarge a jury to a nine-person jury based on the situation.

- Prosecution's opening, Examination, Cross-examination, Re-examination of witnesses
- Defendant's opening, Examination, Cross-examination, Re-examination of witnesses
- Closing
- Summing-up by judge & Verdict

== Substantive law ==
In 1994, Hong Kong studied the reform and codification of inchoate offences, including "incitement, conspiracy, and contempt".

=== Sexual offences ===
==== Rape ====
Rape is an offence under section 118 of the Crimes Ordinance.

== Bibliography ==
- Wai-kin, Victor Ho (2019). Criminal Law in Hong Kong. Wolyers Kluwer. ISBN 9789403509921.
