= Benedikt Carpzov Jr. =

German lawyer

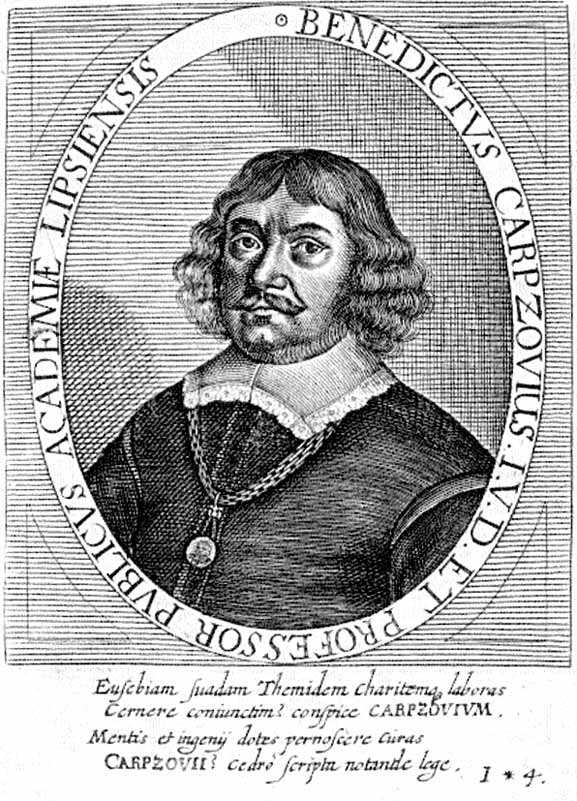
Benedikt Carpzov Junior

Benedikt Carpzov the Younger (27 May 1595, Wittenberg - 30 August 1666, Leipzig) was a German criminal lawyer and a witchcraft theoretician who wrote extensively on witch processes. His 1635 work Practica Rerum Criminalium dealt with the trial of those accused of witchcraft, supporting the use of torture to extract confessions from the accused. Carpzov is considered the founder of the German jurisprudence. He is also known under pen-name Ludovicus de Montesperato.

== Life ==
Benedikt Carpzov the Younger was a descendant of the famous Carpzov family, the son of Benedikt Carpzov the Elder, a renowned lawyer of his time from the Carpzov family. He grew up in Colditz, where he was trained by his father and private tutors. He began his studies of philosophy and jurisprudence at the University of Wittenberg together with his brother Konrad Carpzov in 1610. He eventually focused on law, and continued his studies in 1615 at the University of Leipzig and 1616 at the University of Jena. Upon his return to Wittenberg in 1618, he participated in a dispute under guidance of Wolfgang Hirschbach on December 3 to obtain a licentiate degree, and then received his doctorate in law on February 16, 1619.

In April he left Wittenberg for an educational trip to Italy. There he arrived in Rome via Venice, where he learned Italian, then traveled on to Naples, France, England and the Netherlands. At the latter place he received a letter from his father, who told him that the Elector Johann Georg I of Saxony promised him a position at the Saxon Schöppenstuhl (judicial panel) in Leipzig. On April 25, 1620, he was sworn in as an extraordinary assessor and in 1623 as full assessor. In 1632 he rose to seniority of the institution, worked from 1636 at the Court of Appeals in Leipzig and on 25 June 1639 became Councilor at the Appeal Court.

In August 1644, the Elector appointed him as court and justice councilor in Dresden. But he did not take office because Sigismund Finckelthaus had died. Therefore, on 25 March 1645 he returned with his family to Leipzig and took over a professorship at the Law School of the Leipzig Academy. On February 24, 1648, he took the ordinariate at the Law School and was appointed head of the judicial panel (Schöppenstuhl). Having settled in Leipzig, he was unable to evade a vocation as a Privy Councilor to Dresden in 1653. When he was released in 1661 for reasons of age, he went back to Leipzig and resumed his judicial office at the judicial panel.

He was buried in the Paulinerkirche. His epitaph could be saved before the demolition of the church in 1968 and was restored in 2011.

== Influence ==
He played an important role in establishing an independent German legal system. Based on his own experience, he wrote his works on particular case studies. His most famous work is the Practica nova Imperialis Saxonica rerum criminalium, in which he outlined backgrounds of the criminal law and criminal procedure law. The German criminal law has borrowed so much from this book that for a century it served as a source of law. His last great work, Processus juris in foro Saxonica, has long been a textbook valid in the development of procedural law.

As Carpzov was deeply rooted in the religiosity of his time, his views on criminal justice were under strong influence of the Catholic school of Salamanca, in particular Diego de Covarrubias y Leyva (even though he was a Protestant himself). Following the views of this school, he considered a crime as a rebellion, and ultimately as an insult to God himself. For Carpzov, the offender was not only a lawbreaker who violated a restriction imposed by the authorities, but also a sinner who had rebelled against God. In addition to retribution, the punishment was meant to deter the general public from committing similar offences. Although his views on criminal punishment were quite severe (in the midst of the Thirty Years' War), he paid special attention to the punishment being commensurate with the offence.

=== Witch trials ===
It is often claimed he was involved in sentencing 20,000 people accused of witchcraft to death. This is a myth based on a single note and no actual evidence. In 1635 he published Practica Rerum Criminalium, dealing with the trial of those accused of witchcraft. Carpzov conceded that the use of torture could be abused in certain cases, but that its use was nonetheless necessary, even on those who might appear to be innocent. Carpzov urged that even those who merely believed that they had attended a Witches' Sabbath should be executed, for the belief itself implied the will. Under Carpzov's influence the use of torture to extract confessions from those accused of witchcraft was intensified.

Carpzov was married twice and had multiple children in his first marriage.

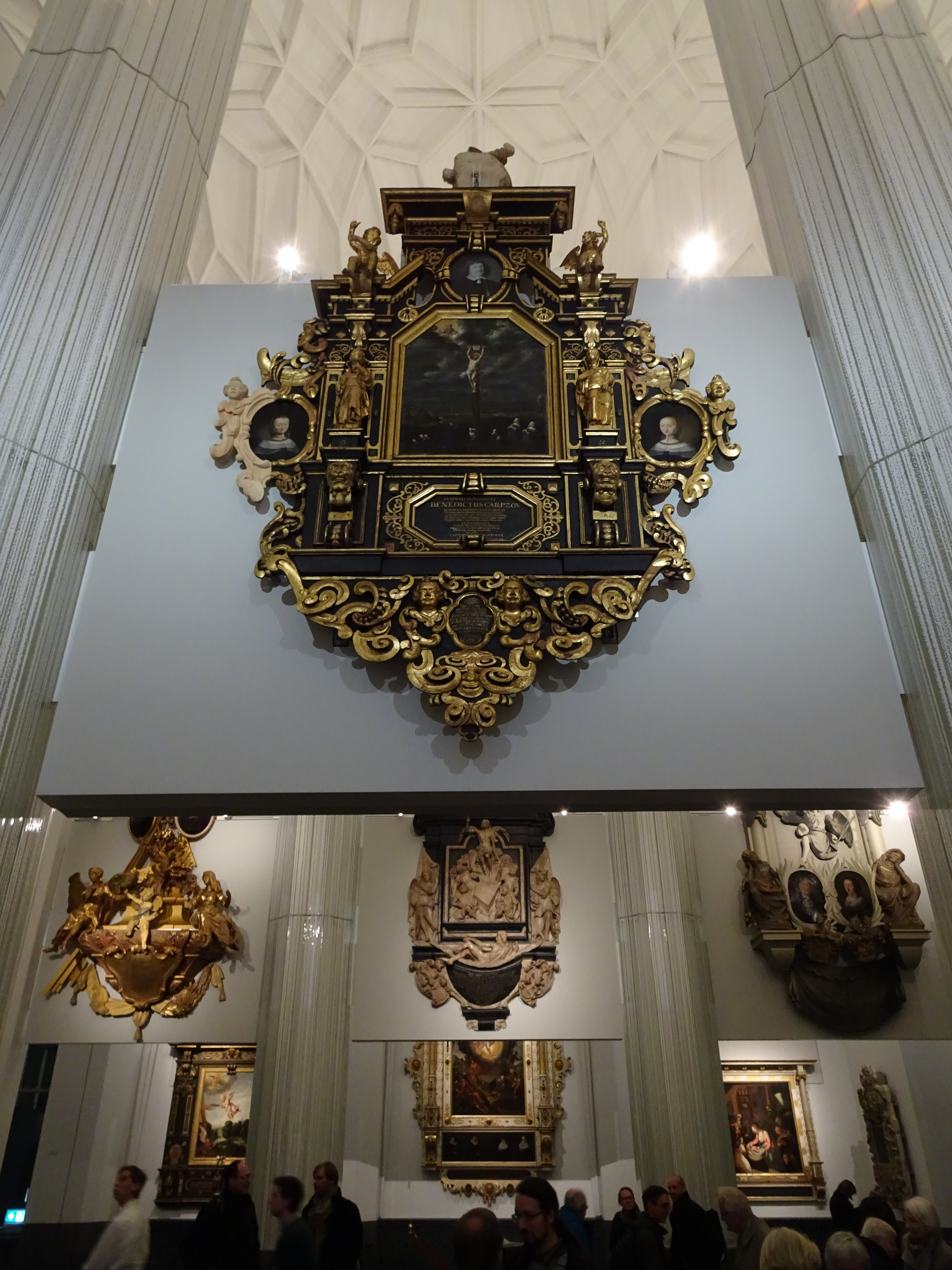
Epitaph in the Paulinerkirche (2017)

== Memory ==
In 2001 a street in Leipzig was named Carpzovstrasse in his memory.

== Works ==
- Practica nova imperialis Saxonica rerum criminalium. Wittenberg 1635, Frankfurt/Main 1752 Nachweis zu Digitalisaten der Ausgabe 1670
- Peinlicher Sächsischer Inquisition und Achts-Prozeß. Leipzig 1638, 1733
- Processus juris in foro Saxonica. Frankfurt/Main 1638, Jena 1657, 1708
- Responsa juris electoralia. Leipzig 1642
- Jurisprudentia ecclesiastica seu consistorialis. Hannover 1649, 1721
- Jurisprudentia forensis Romano-Saxiona. Frankfurt/Main 1638, Leipzig 1721

== Literature ==
- Günter Jerouschek, Wolfgang Schild & Walter Gropp (Hrsg.): Benedict Carpzov. Neue Perspektiven zu einem umstrittenen sächsischen Juristen. Edition diskord, Tübingen 2000, ISBN 3-89295-695-2
- Thomas Robisheaux: Zur Rezeption Benedict Carpzovs im 17. Jahrhundert. In: Herbert Eiden & Rita Voltmer (Hrsg.): Hexenprozesse und Gerichtspraxis. Spee, Trier 2002, ISBN 3-87760-128-6, S. 527–543
- Ulrich Falk: Zur Folter im deutschen Strafprozeß. Das Regelungsmodell von Benedict Carpzov (1595–1666). In: forum historiae iuris. 20. Juni 2001 (PDF)
- Sieghardt von Köckritz: Die Bedeutung des Willens für den Verbrechensbegriff Carpzovs in der Practica nova imperialis Saxonica rerum criminalium. Diss. 1956
- Bernhard Heitsch: Beweis und Verurteilung im Inquisitionsprozeß Benedict Carpzovs. Juristische Dissertation. Göttingen 1964
- Winfried Trusen: Benedict Carpzov und die Hexenverfolgungen. In: Ellen Schlüchter & Klaus Laubenthal (Hrsg.): Recht und Kriminalität. Festschrift für Friedrich-Wilhelm Krause zum 70. Geburtstag. Heymann, Köln [u. a.] 1990, ISBN 3-452-21890-2, S. 19–35
- Rudolf Hoke: Die Souveränitätslehre des Benedict Carpzov. In: Herbert Haller, Christian Kopetzki, Richard Novak, Stanley L. Paulson, Bernhard Raschauer, Georg Ress & Ewald Wiederin (Hrsg.): Staat und Recht. Festschrift für Günther Winkler. Springer, Wien/New York 1997, ISBN 3-211-83024-3
- Tim Schaetze: Benedikt Carpzov als Dogmatiker des Privatrechts. Shaker, Aachen 1999, ISBN 3-8265-5879-0
- Christian von Bar & Peter Dopffel: Deutsches internationales Privatrecht im 16. und 17. Jahrhundert. Mohr, Tübingen 1995, ISBN 3-16-146448-6, S. 300–410
- Fritz Roth: Restlose Auswertung von Leichenpredigten und Personalschriften für genealogische und kulturhistorische Zwecke. Band 4, R 3329
- Johann Friedrich Jugler: Beiträge zur juristischen Biographie. Johann Samuel Heinsius, Leipzig 1773 (GoogleBooks)
