= Tanzio da Varallo =

Italian painter

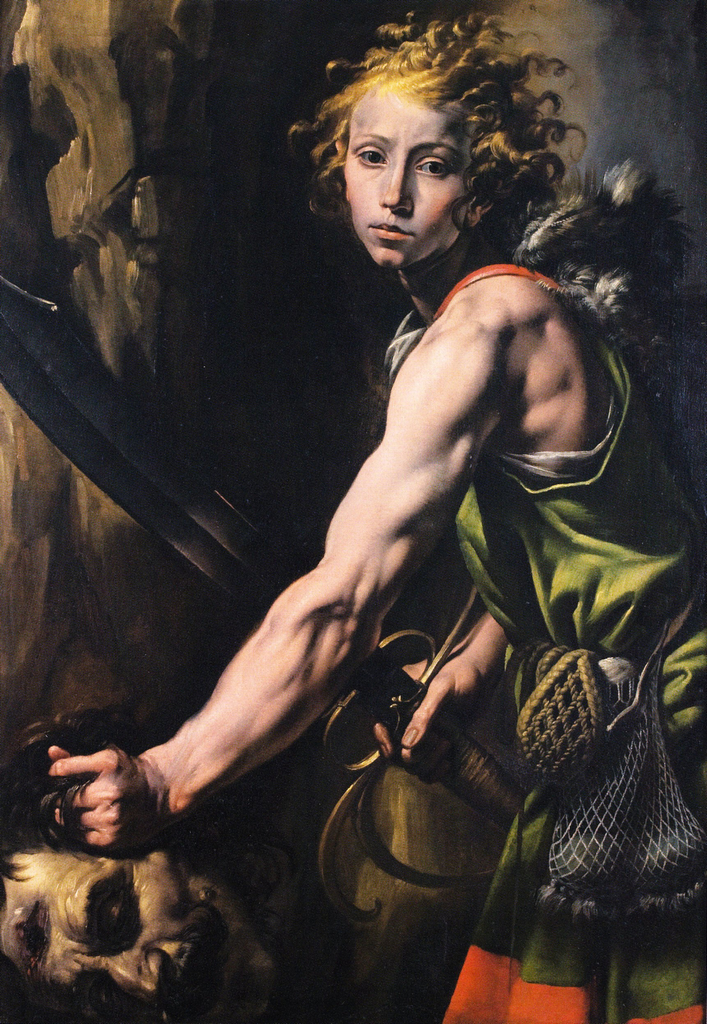
- Tanzio da Varallo, David and Goliath, c. 1625 (Pinacoteca civica, Varallo)
- Born: c. 1575/1580; Alagna Valsesia, Duchy of Milan
- Died: c. 1632/1633; Varallo, Duchy of Milan
- Known for: Painting
- Movement: Mannerism; Baroque

Antonio d'Enrico, called Tanzio da Varallo, or simply il Tanzio (c. 1575/1580 – c. 1632/1633) was an Italian painter of the late-Mannerist or early Baroque period. With Giovanni Battista Crespi, Giulio Cesare Procaccini and Pier Francesco Mazzucchelli, he was one of the principal Lombard painters of the early 17th century.

== Biography ==
=== Early life, to 1625 ===
Tanzio was born in Giacomolo hamlet, in Alagna Valsesia. His family had lived at Varallo since 1586, and he had two brothers who were also artists: the fresco painter Melchiorre d’Enrico, with whom he may have trained, and the sculptor and architect Giovanni d’Enrico (c. 1560–1644). On 12 February 1600 a safe conduct was issued to Melchiorre and Tanzio to leave Valsesia to visit Rome for the Holy Year. Tanzio’s first biographer, Cotta, wrote that the artist studied ‘in the Academies of Rome’ and that in 1627 ‘he left works, both of figures and landscapes, in Naples, in several places in Apulia, in Venice and in Vienna’. Though previously viewed with suspicion, recent discoveries have given some credence to this latter idea. Certainly early works of his have been discovered in what was then Apulia (now the Abruzzo): two altarpieces, the Circumcision (c. 1610; Fara San Martino, parish church) and the Miracle of the Quenched Fire (c. 1612; Pescocostanzo, Collegiata), and fragments of another that are now in the church of Santa Restituta in Naples. These show an early indebtedness to Caravaggio, and to the severity of Spanish Caravaggism. The Circumcision has clear iconographical similarities with a work of the same title by Orazio Gentileschi (c. 1605; Ancona, Chiesa del Gesù), suggesting that Tanzio was familiar with the work that Gentileschi did in the Marche c. 1616. The Miracle of the Quenched Fire, distinguished by the robust naturalism of the portrait of the patron, with an intensely spiritual St. Francis and radiantly beautiful angels, reverts to the more emotional style of the contemporary Milanese painters, Giulio Cesare Procaccini and Giovanni Battista Crespi, and was possibly painted after a brief return to the north. The fragments in Santa Restituta, Naples, suggest the influence of Orazio Borgianni and Antiveduto Grammatica.

It is not known exactly when Tanzio returned to Piedmont, but in 1611 an ‘Antonio, son of Giovanni d’Enrico’ is mentioned at Varallo. It is probable that the full-length portrait of Giovan Battista Caccia (priv. col.) attributed to Tanzio was painted in the Valsesia before 1613. The altarpiece in Domodossola Cathedral, St. Charles Borromeo Administering the Sacrament to Plague Victims, was Tanzio’s first major commission on his return. It must have been done before 27 August 1616, when it was mentioned in an account of an episcopal visit. The picture retains the archaizing quality of the Abruzzo altarpieces, but reveals a more intense naturalism in the powerful portrait heads of the bystanders and the almost trompe-l'œil effect of the butterfly in the foreground. This highly individual style of Caravaggism was not found elsewhere in Piedmont. Yet he also responded to Lombard Late Mannerism and to the art of Gaudenzio Ferrari. His brother Giovanni, who worked at the sacromonte of Varallo, where he created many terracotta statues in a Lombard populist style, also influenced his development. Probably from the same period as the Domodossala altarpiece are the Portrait of a Man and Portrait of a Woman (both Milan, Pinacoteca di Brera), St. Anthony (Varallo, Pinacoteca) and the St. Agatha (Milan, priv. col.).

Between 1616 and 1617, with his brother Giovanni, he decorated Chapel XXVII at the Sacro Monte di Varallo with frescoes and sculptures illustrating the theme of Christ before Pilate. Tanzio developed the popular realist style of his predecessor at Varallo, Gaudenzio Ferrari, creating vivid and immediate figures that move away from the more scenographic style of Morazzone’s frescoes in Chapels XXXIII and XXXVI and are in keeping with Giovanni’s statues. The background perspective view based on the ruined Torre delle Milizie in Rome recalls Tanzio’s period there. In 1618–20 the brothers again collaborated on the decoration of Chapel XXXIV with Pilate Washing his Hands. The vibrant chromatic tones of all these frescoes suggest the possible influence of Venetian art, perhaps of Paolo Veronese’s secular frescoes. There are many preparatory sketches for the sacromonte frescoes (Varallo, Pinacoteca), including a Flying Angel for the vault of Chapel XXVII. It is likely that his two pictures of David with the Head of Goliath (Varallo, Pinacoteca, nos 57 and 58) may be dated to this period. One of these (no. 58) recalls the young men in Christ before Pilate. The more celebrated work (no. 57) – a languid David holding up Goliath’s head in one hand and supporting his sword over his shoulder with the other – was probably slightly later.

=== After 1625 ===
For Santa Cristina, Borgomanero, Tanzio painted the Virgin of the Rosary with St. Dominic and St. Catherine of Alexandria, which was in situ by 1626. There followed a group of more painterly works that include the Visitation (1627; Vagna, San Brizio) and St. Mark and St. Peter (Turin, Galleria Sabauda), the latter’s intensely moving atmosphere suggesting the deepening influence of Milanese painters, especially Cerano and Daniele Crespi. The most powerful of these works is the dramatic St. Charles Borromeo Carrying the Holy Nail in Procession (shortly after 1628; Cellio, parish church), dominated by the cadaverous figure of the saint, exhausted by asceticism. The fresco Christ before Herod, in Chapel XXVIII of the Sacro Monte, was completed by 1628.

In 1627–9 he decorated, in both fresco and oil, the chapel of the Guardian Angel in San Gaudenzio, Novara with scenes illustrating angelic intervention. This chapel is opposite the chapel of the Pia Mortis Sodalitas, frescoed by Morazzone in 1620, and the theatricality of Tanzio’s huge Battle of Sennacherib suggests Morazzone’s influence. This is Tanzio’s most dramatic and emotional work, its foreground crowded with distorted, brutally realistic figures, lit by violent slashes of light and shadowed by the vast expanse of darkness above. A bozzetto for it survives (Novara, Musei Civici). The effects of light are close to those in the Trinity Adored by Saints (after 1628; Varallo, Pinacoteca). To the same years may be dated the Portrait of a Woman (priv. col.) in a style similar to that of Daniele Crespi. In his late works, such as St. John the Baptist in the Desert (c. 1630; Tulsa, OK, Philbrook Art Center), Tanzio drew close to the art of Giulio Cesare Procaccini. Yet St. Sebastian Cared for by Angels (Washington, D.C., National Gallery of Art), a work with Gentileschi’s grace, yet cooler and more objective, stresses the analytical precision and mature response to Caravaggio’s naturalism that separates his art from that of his Lombard contemporaries. The altarpiece depicting the Virgin and Child with St. Dominic and St. Francis (Lumellogno, parish church) is certainly after 1627. The Virgin and Child with St. Charles Borromeo and St. Francis of Assisi (after 1628; Varallo, Pinacoteca) comes from the oratory of San Carlo at Sabbia and is an important example of the celebration of Charles Borromeo that inspired Lombard painters in the first 30 years of the 17th century.

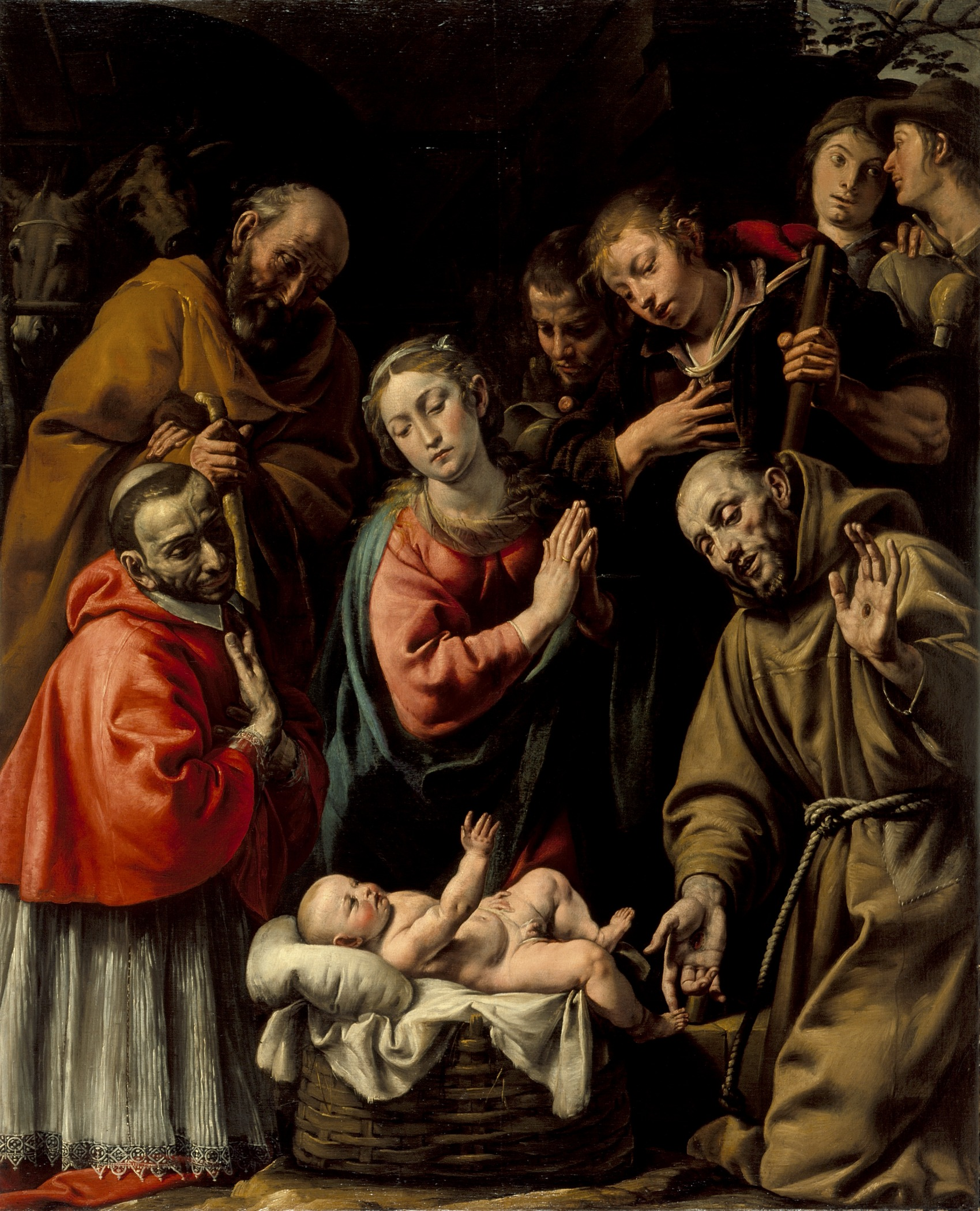
Nativity Adored by St. Francis and St. Charles Borromeo, Los Angeles County Museum of Art

The Nativity Adored by St. Francis and St. Charles Borromeo (Los Angeles County Museum of Art) is close in style to this work. Plague struck Lombardy in 1630. The small altarpiece St. Roch Interceding on behalf of the People of Camasco (1631; Camasco, parish church) is a votive offering for the recently ceased outbreak. The village priest and his congregation touchingly appeal to the plague saint, St. Roch, who, accompanied by his dog with a loaf of bread in its mouth, intercedes on their behalf. St. Roch’s long fingers, fervent and expressive, are characteristic of Tanzio’s style. A highly finished drawing in red chalk (Venice, Gallerie dell'Accademia) is a study for this work. The four canvases of St. John the Evangelist, St. Catherine, St. Appollonia and St. Theodulus (all Verbania-Pallanza, Museo del Paesaggio) show a similar monumental figure style.

Around 1630, and in the years immediately following, Tanzio painted frescoes in two Milanese churches: Christ in Glory among the Angels in Sant’Antonio and the Annunciation to the Shepherds, the Nativity and Angels in Glory in Santa Maria della Pace. These frescoes are less brilliant and nervous in execution, and less rich in colour, than those at the Sacro Monte. The intimate Rest on the Flight into Egypt (Houston Museum of Fine Arts) is from the same period and shows a similar interest in the traditions of northern landscape deriving from the works of Adam Elsheimer and Rubens. The landscape is of primary interest in the St. Benedict among the Thorns (Busto Arsizio, Varese, Candiani priv. col.), a composition that has similarities with the dated lunette frescoes of scenes from the Life of St. Francis (1634; Borgosesia, parish church).

Tanzio’s latest works, such as the Martyrdom of the Franciscan Saints (Milan, Pinacoteca di Brera) and the portrait of the Blessed Giovanni Ravelli (Varallo, Pinacoteca), are marked by less taut drawing, denser pictorial fabric and muted colours. Tanzio died in Varallo around 1632. His brother Melchiorre was also a painter, studied in Milan, and painted a Last Judgement for the parish of Riva.

== Works ==
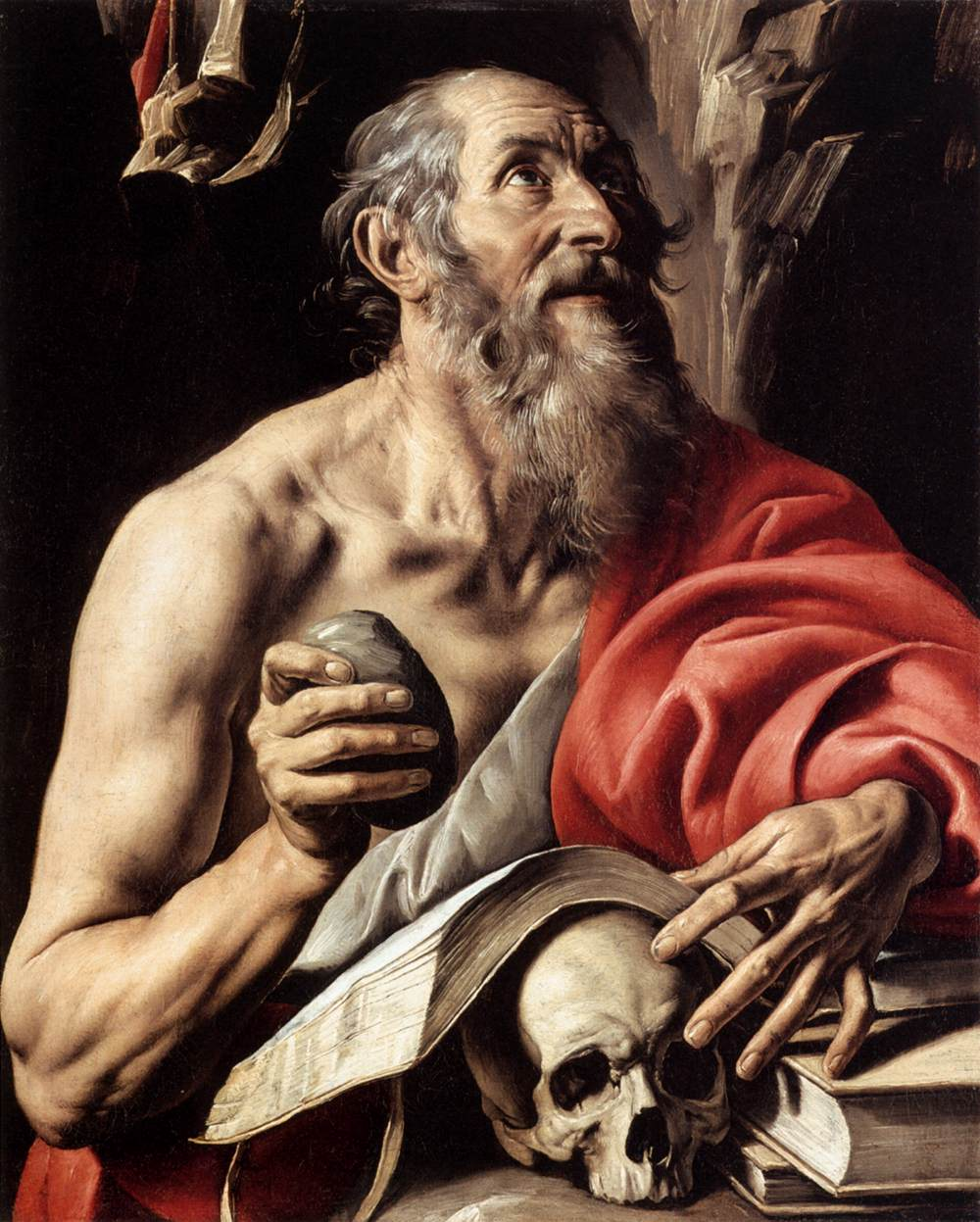
St. Jerome, 1624–1626, Nelson-Atkins Museum of Art, Kansas City, Missouri

- Madonna col Bambino, San Francesco e donatore, oil on canvas, c. 1610, Colledimezzo (CH), parish church of San Giovanni Evangelista.
- Circumcision, oil on canvas, c. 1610, Fara San Martino (CH), church of San Remigio.
- Pentecost (5 fragments), oil on canvas, Naples, previously in church of Santa Restituta, now in the Museo di Capodimonte.
- Madonna dell'incendio sedato, oil on canvas, 1614, Pescocostanzo (AQ), collegiate church of Santa Maria in Colle.
- San Carlo attends those afflicted with plague, oil on canvas, 1615–16, Domodossola (VB), collegiate church of Santi Gervasio e Protasio.
- Sant'Antonio da Padova, oil on canvas, Varallo Sesia, Pinacoteca Civica.
- San Sebastiano curato da Sant'Irene e un angelo, oil on canvas, National Gallery of Art, Washington, Samuel H. Kress Collection.
- Christ taken to court of Pilate for first time, fresco, 1617–18, Varallo Sesia, Sacro Monte, Cappella XXVII.
- Pilate washes his hands, fresco, 1619–20, Varallo Sesia, Sacro Monte, Cappella XXXIV.
- San Giovanni Evangelista, Santa Caterina d’Alessandria, San Teodoro e Santa Apollonia, oil on canvas, 1618, Verbania – Pallanza, Museo del Paesaggio.
- Davide con la testa di Golia, oil on canvas, Varallo Sesia, Pinacoteca Civica.
- Gentiluomo, oil on canvas, Milan, Pinacoteca di Brera.
- Gentildonna, oil on canvas, Milan, Pinacoteca di Brera.
- Testa di gentiluomo, oil on copper, Gallarate, Museo Gallaratese di Studi Patri.
- San Gerolamo, oil on canvas, Kansas City, The Nelson-Atkins Museum of Art.
- Adorazione dei pastori, 1605–1610, Palais des beaux-arts de Lille.
- La Vergine col Bambino adorata dai santi Domenico e Francesco, oil on canvas, Lumellogno (NO), church of Santi Ippolito e Cassiano.
- Due angeli che reggono la corona della Vergine, oil on canvas, Varallo Sesia, Pinacoteca.
- Jacob and Rachel, oil on canvas, Turin, Galleria Sabauda.
- Visitation, oil on canvas, Vagna, frazione of Domodossola, church of San Brizio.
- Gentiluomo, oil on canvas, c.1625, Cleveland (Ohio), The Cleveland Museum of Art.
- Adoration of shepherds with San Carlo Borromeo, oil on canvas, Turin, Museo Civico di Arte Antica.
- Adoration dei pastori con San Francesco e San Carlo Borromeo, oil on canvas, Los Angeles, Los Angeles Country Museum of Art.
- La fuga in Egitto, oil on canvas, Houston, The Museum of Fine Arts, Samuel H. Kress Collection.
- San Giovanni Battista nel deserto, oil on canvas, Tulsa, Oklahoma, Philbrook Museum of Art.
- Gesù davanti ad Erode, fresco, 1628, Varallo Sesia, Sacro Monte, 1628, Cappella XXVIII.
- San Carlo porta in processione il Sacro Chiodo, oil on canvas, c. 1629, Cellio (VC), parish church of San Lorenzo.
- Santi in adorazione della Trinità, Fontaneto d’Agogna (NO), oil on canvas, parish church of Beata Vergine Assunta.
- I Santi Pietro e Marco, oil on canvas, Turin, Galleria Sabauda.
- Crucifixion, oil on canvas, Gerenzano, parish church of Santi Pietro e Paolo.
- Decorazione della cappella dell'Angelo Custode, fresco, and Sennacherib sconfitto dall'Angelo, oil on canvas, 1617–19, Novara, Basilica di San Gaudenzio.
- Sennacherib sconfitto dall'Angelo, oil on canvas, c. 1618, Novara, Museo Civico.
- Annuncio dei pastori, Adorazione dei pastori, Gloria angelica, 1631–32, fresco, Milan, Santa Maria della Pace.
- Il Redentore in gloria, I profeti Daniele e Isaia, Angeli musicanti, fresco, 1631–32, Milan, church of Sant’Antonio Abate.
- St Roch, oil on canvas, Varallo Sesia, Pinacoteca (previously in the parish church of Camasco, frazione of Varallo Sesia).
- La Madonna col Bambino e i santi Carlo e Francesco, oil on canvas, Varallo Sesia, Pinacoteca.
- Martyrdom of Franciscans in Nagasaki, oil on canvas, Milan, Pinacoteca di Brera.
- Beato Giovanni Tavelli da Tossignano, oil on canvas, Varallo Sesia, Pinacoteca.
- Decorazione a fresco della cappella Gibellini, Borgosesia (VC), collegiate church of Santi Pietro e Paolo.

== Gallery ==
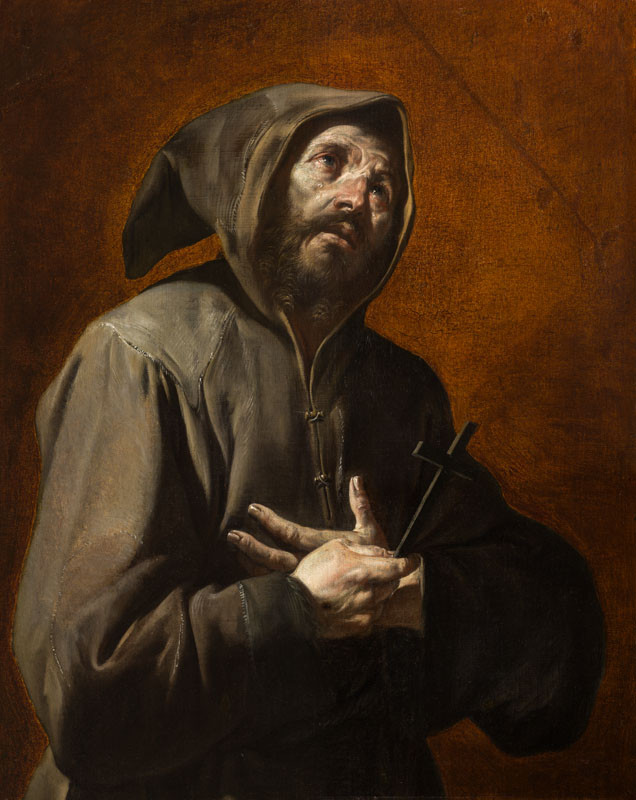
St. Francis of Assisi, National Gallery Prague

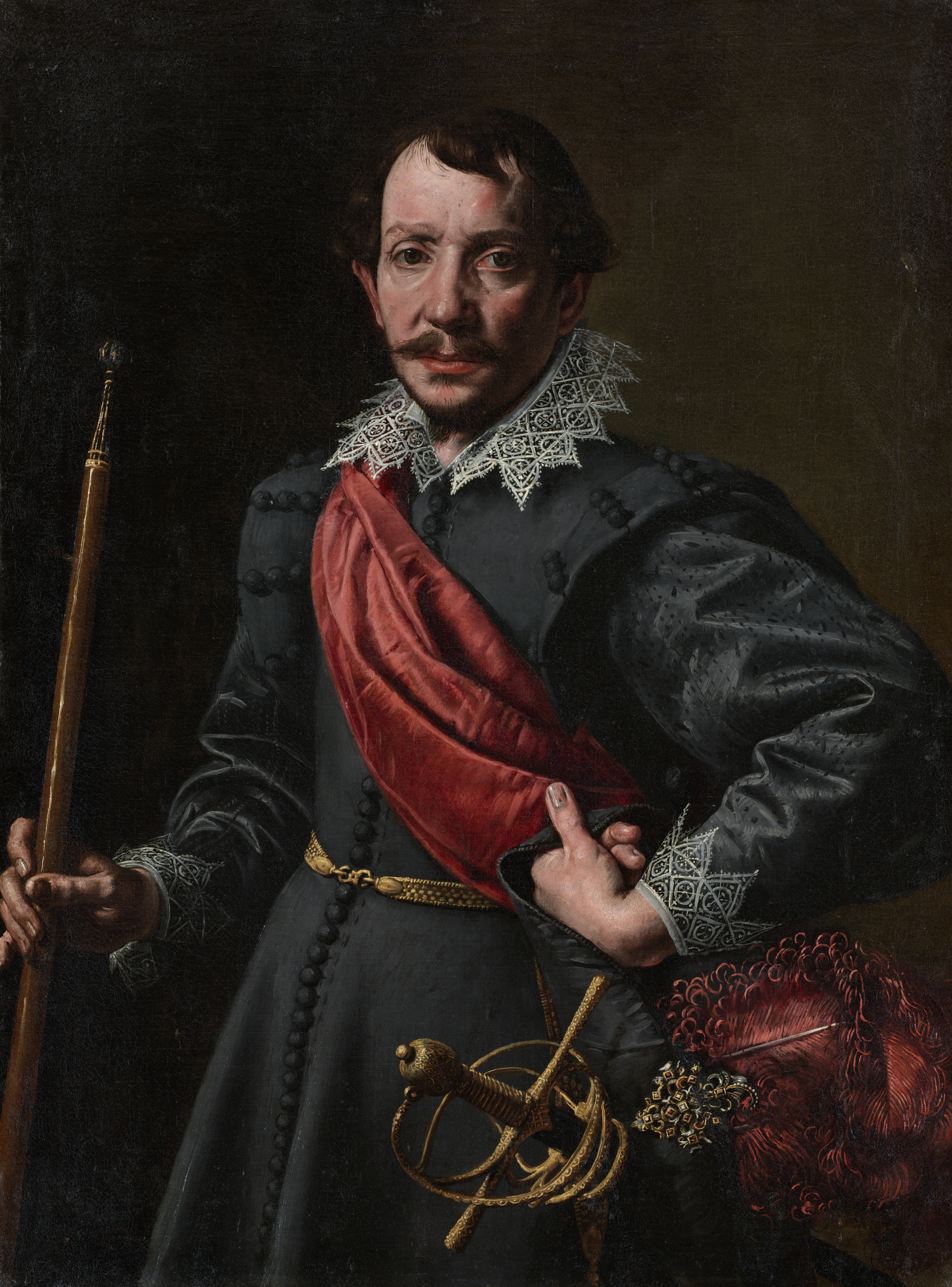
Portrait of a Man, 1615, Cleveland Museum of Art

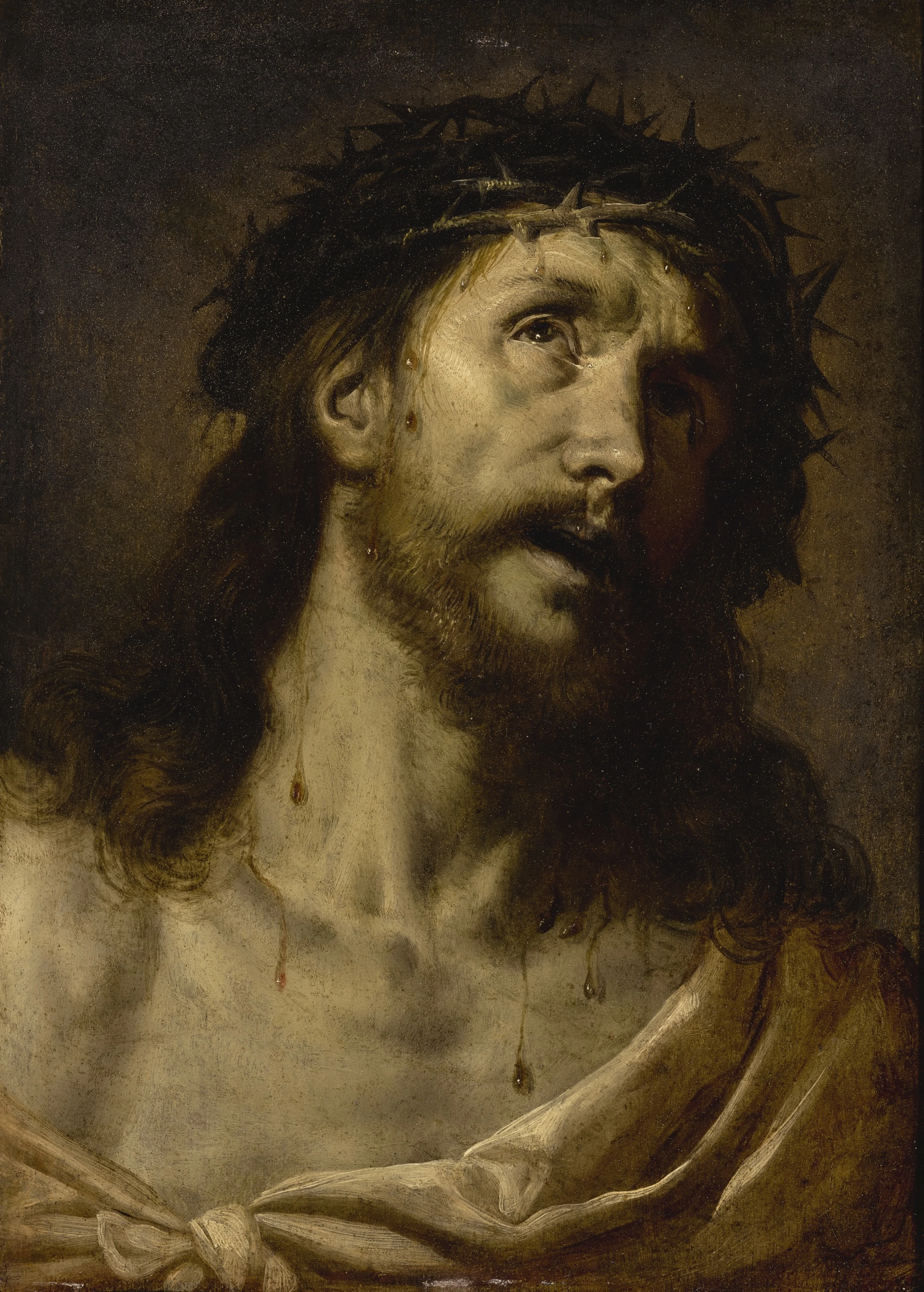
Ecce Homo, priv. col.

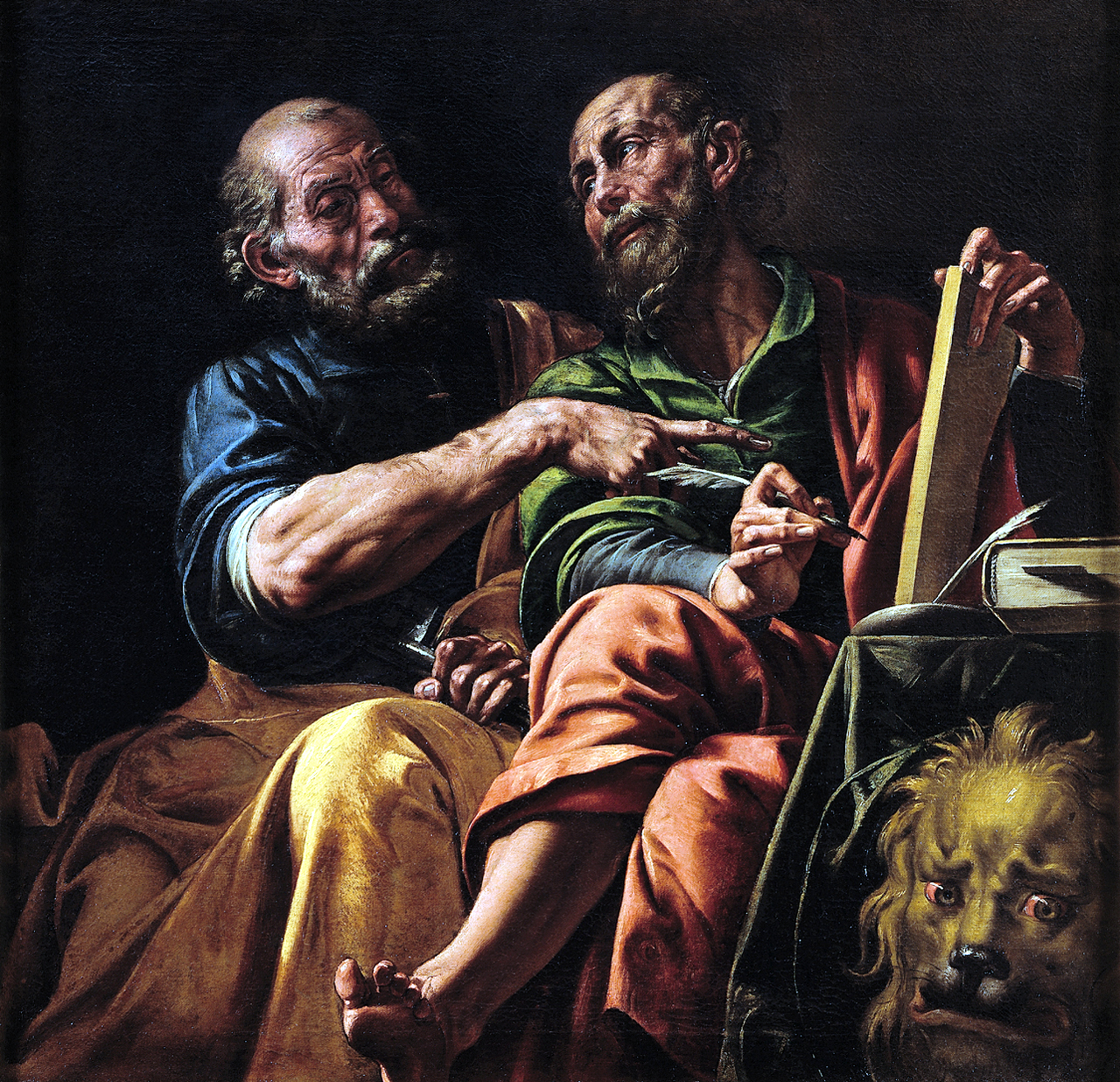
St. Peter and St. Mark, Galleria Sabauda, Turin

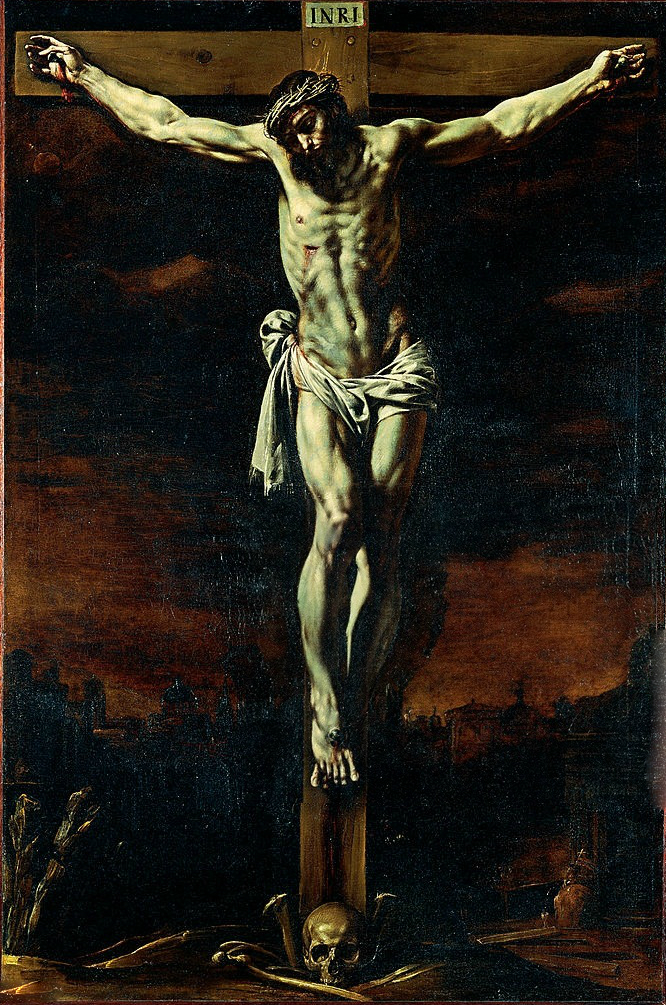
Crucifixion, Diocesan Museum of Milan

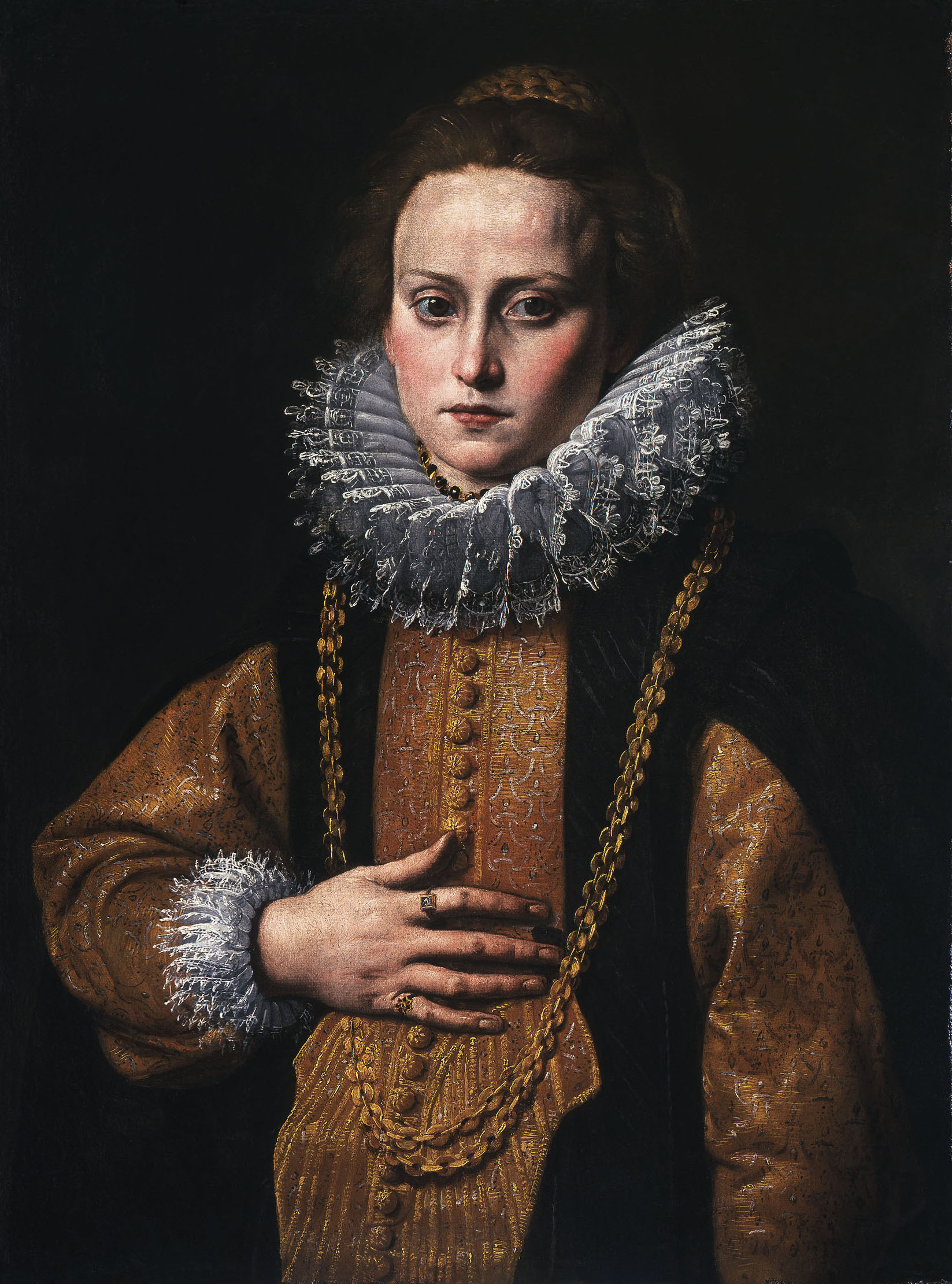
Portrait of a Lady, c. 1617-1618, Pinacoteca di Brera, Milan

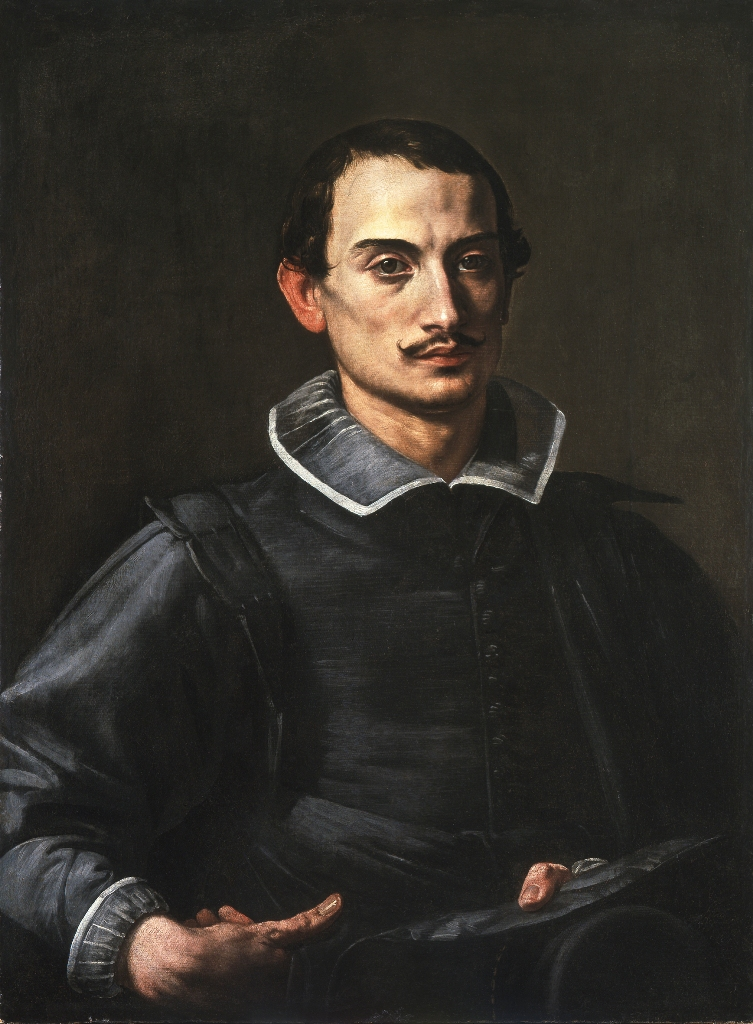
Portrait of a Gentleman, c. 1613-1616, Pinacoteca di Brera, Milan

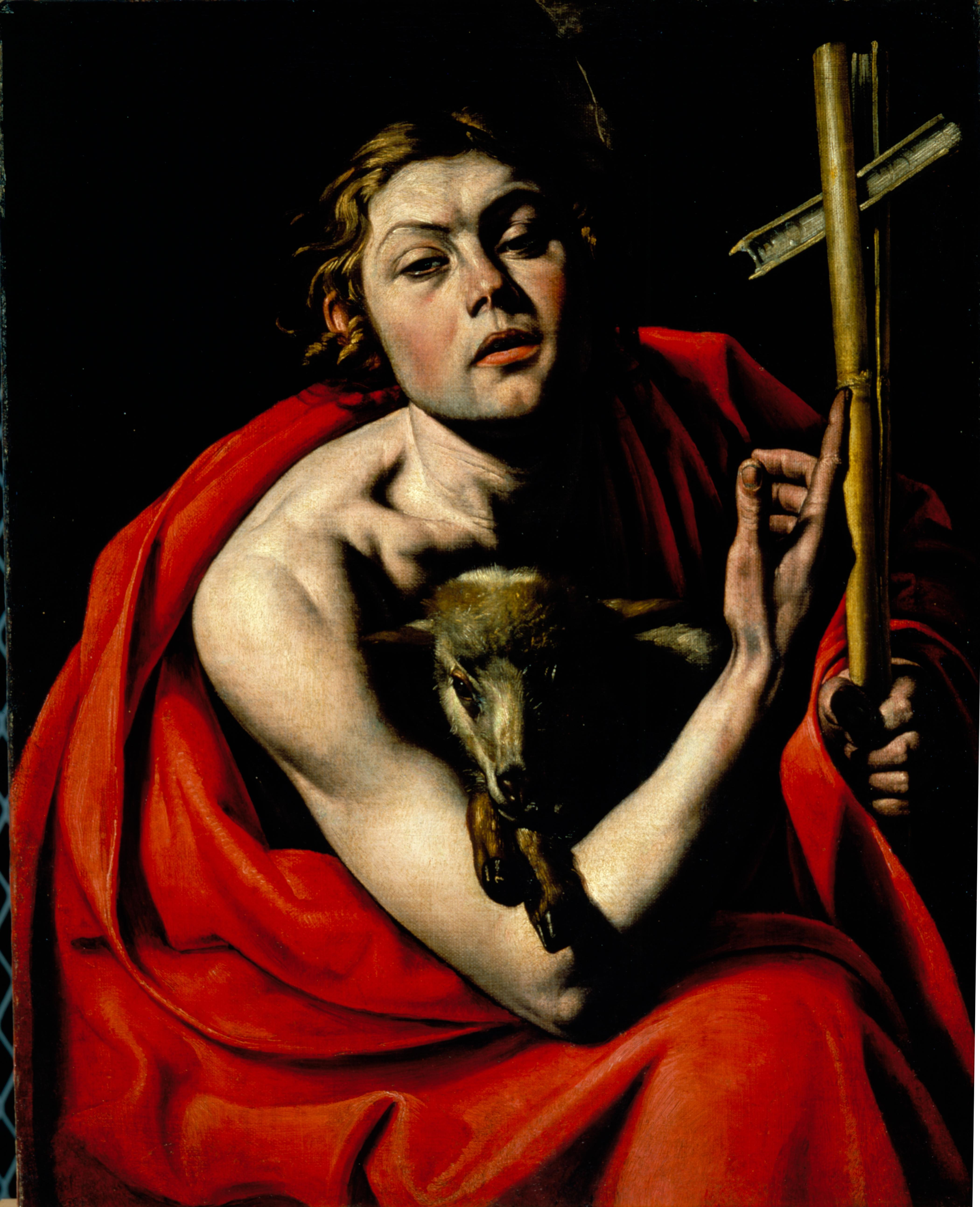
St John the Baptist, Allen Memorial Art Museum, Oberlin, Ohio

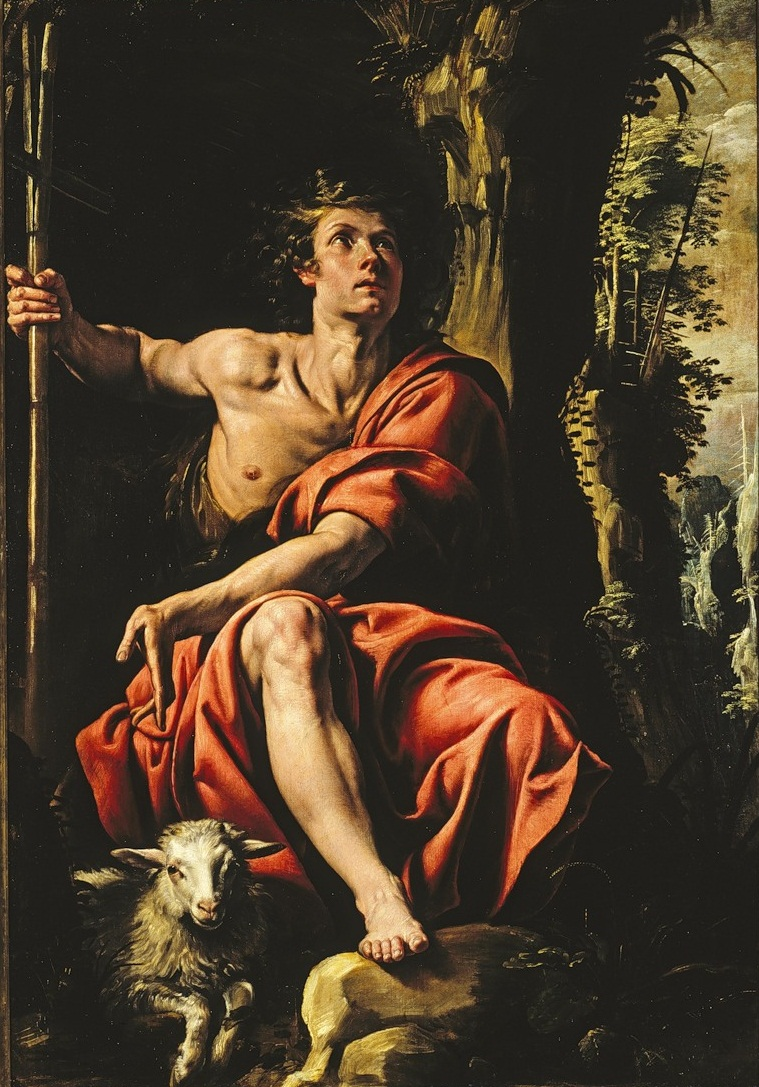
St John the Baptist in the Desert, c. 1627-1629, Philbrook Museum of Art, Tulsa

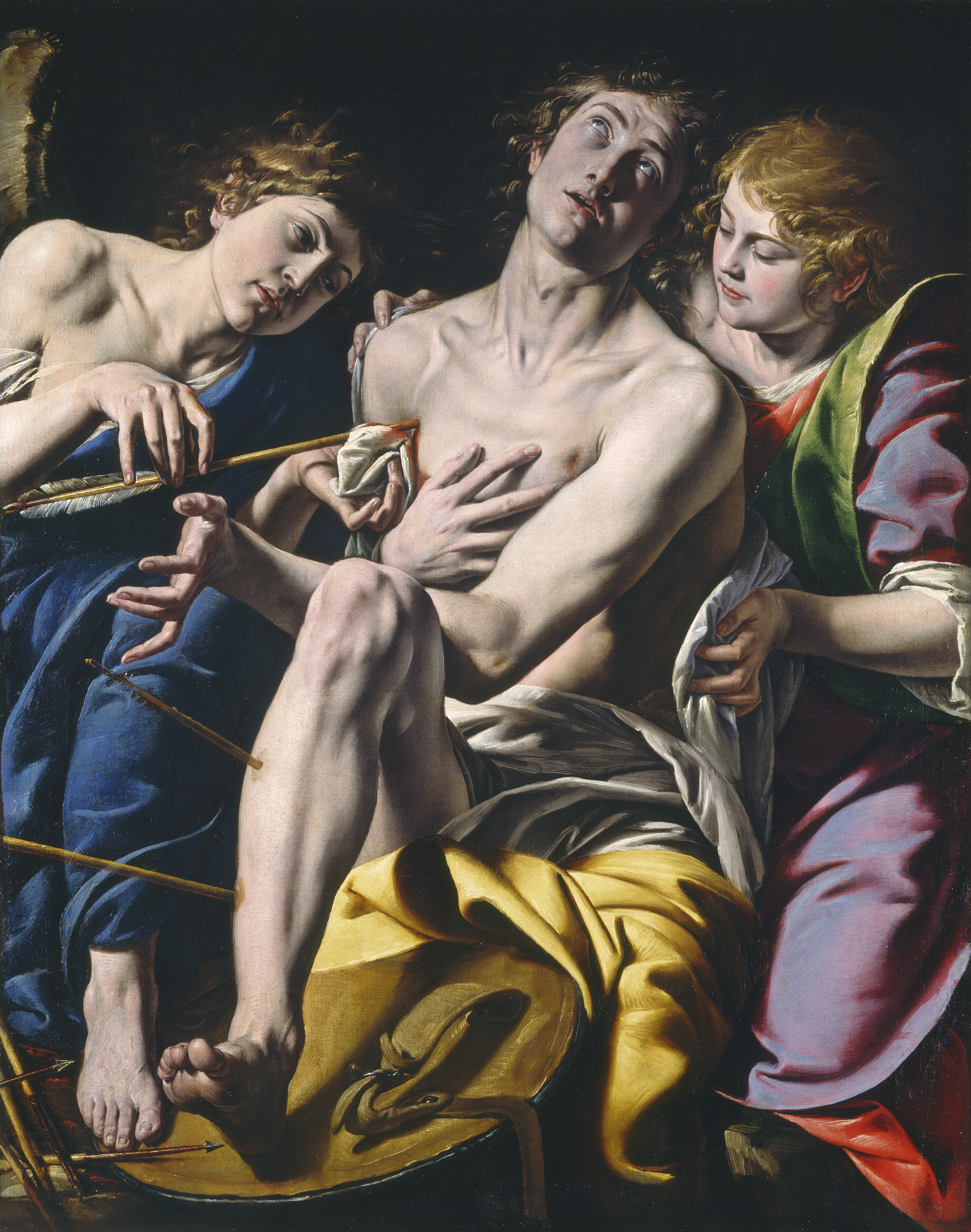
Saint Sebastian Tended by Saint Irene, c. 1620-1630, National Gallery of Art, Washington, D.C.

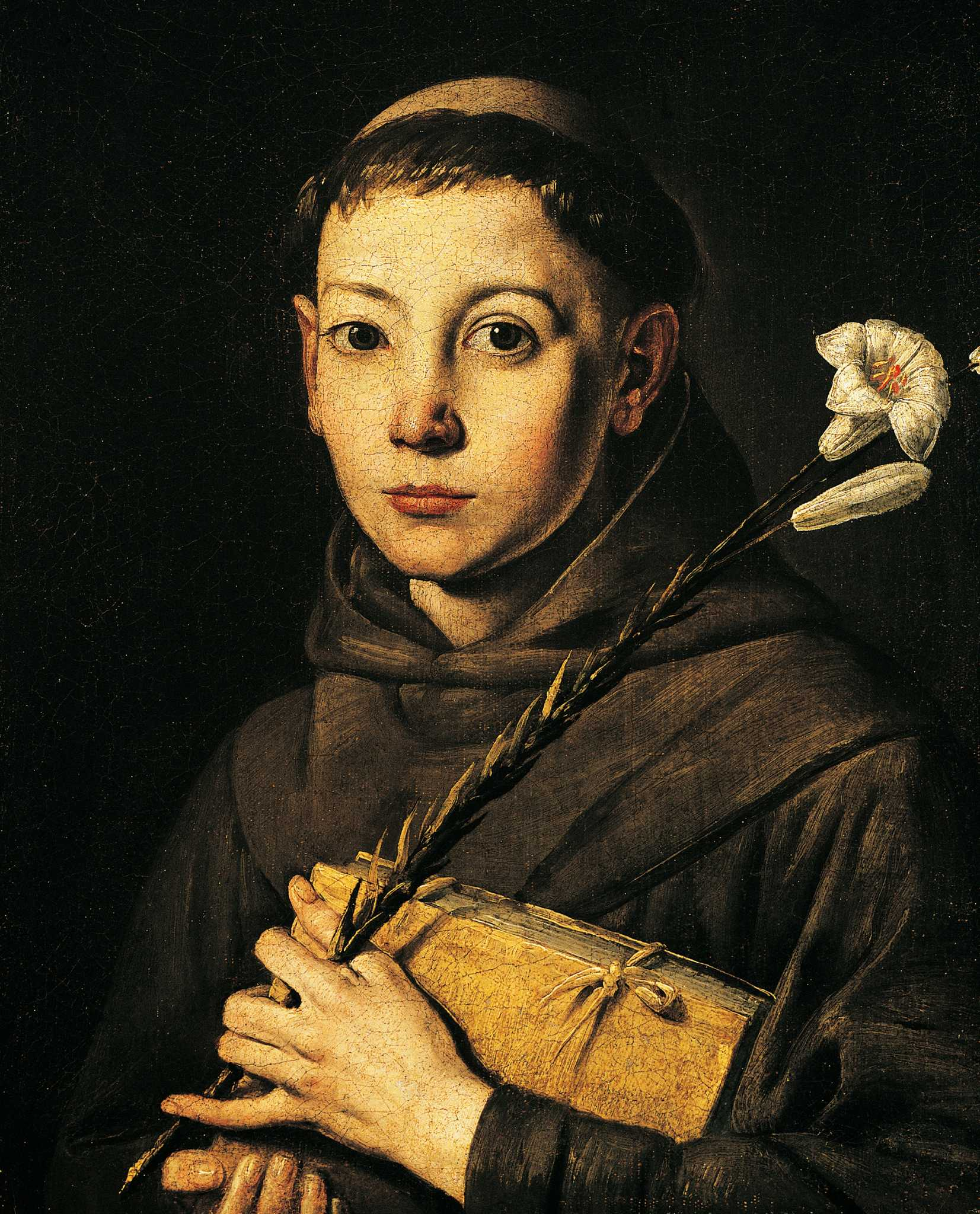
St. Antony of Padua, c. 1617-1618, Pinacoteca Civica, Varallo

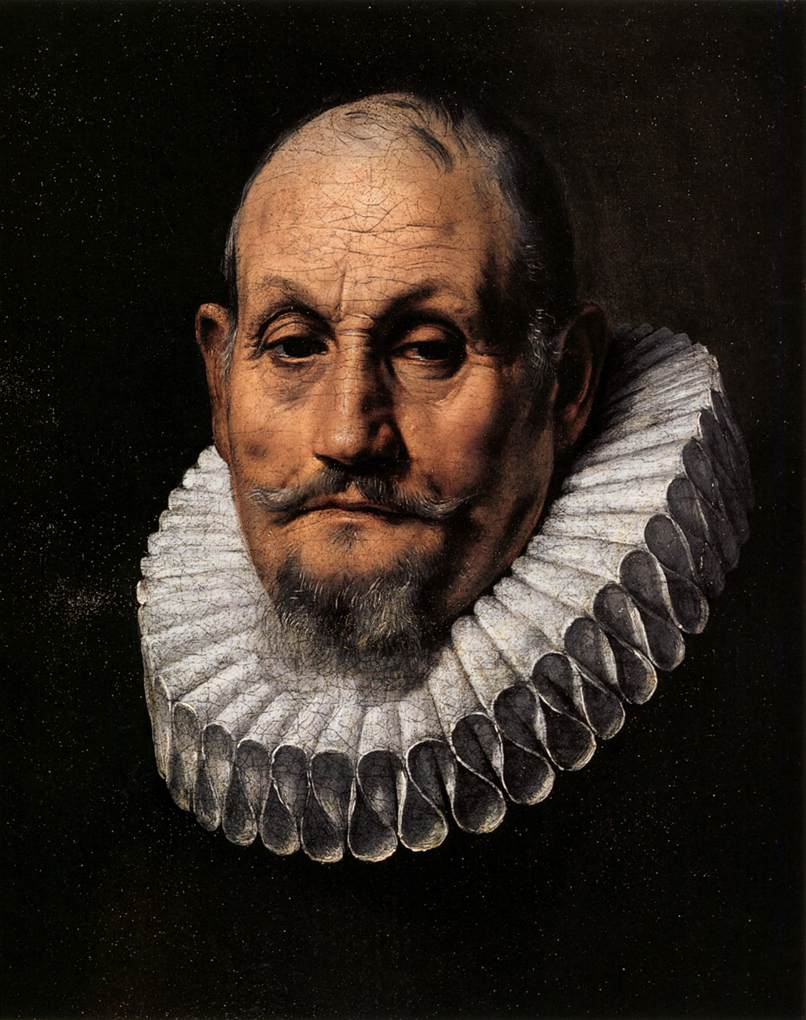
Portrait of a Gentleman, c. 1620, priv. col.

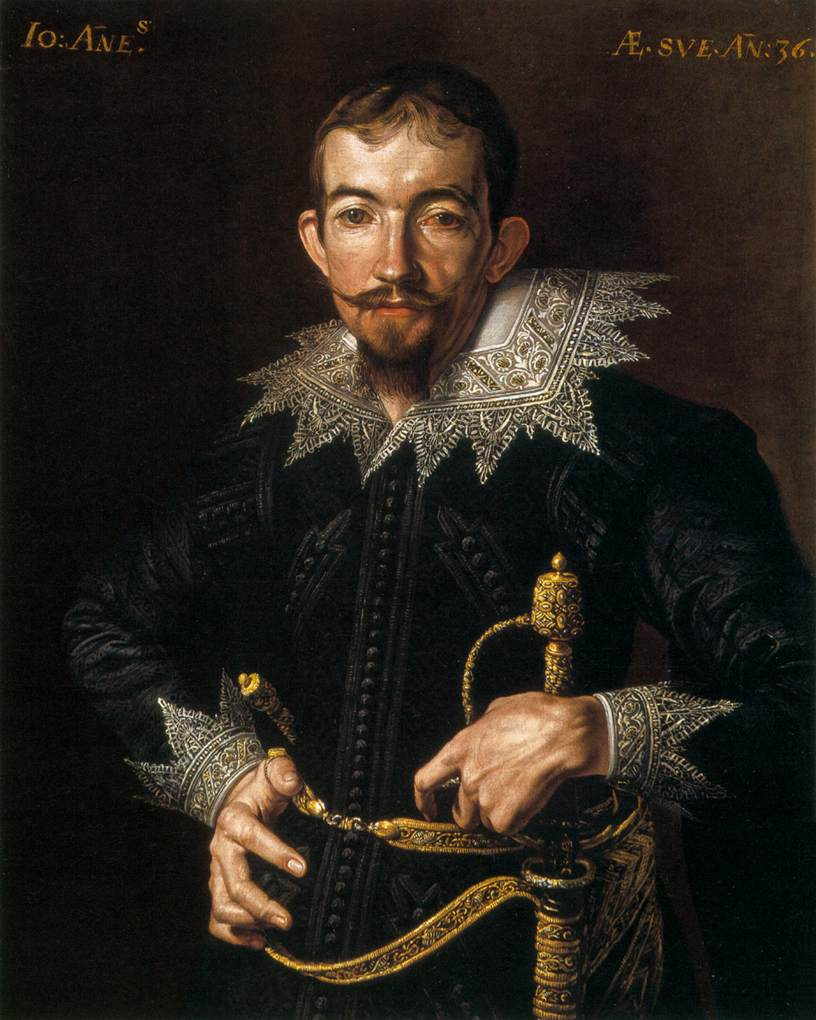
Portrait of a Gentleman with a Sword, c. 1615, priv. col.

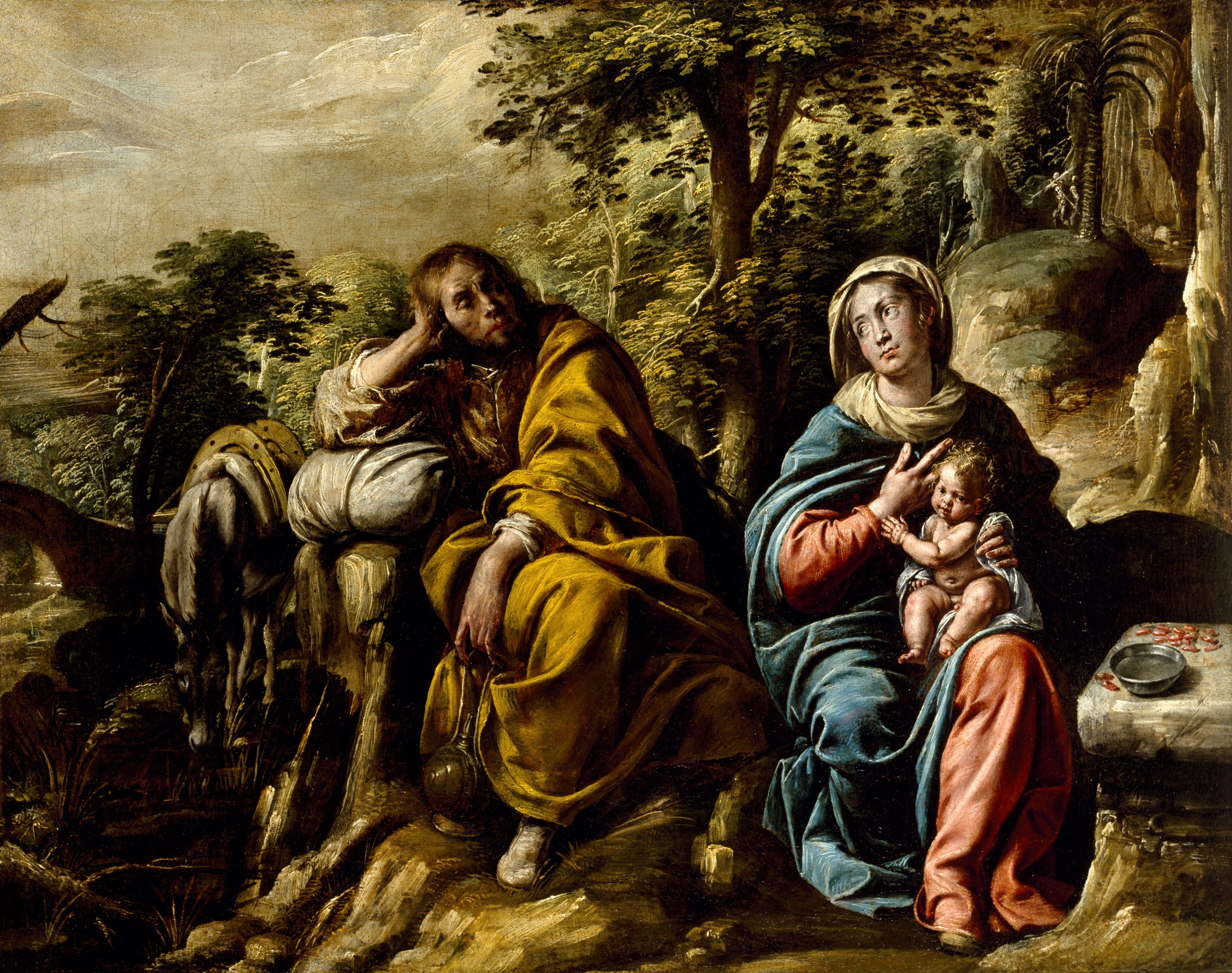
The Rest on the Flight into Egypt, c. 1615, Museum of Fine Arts, Houston

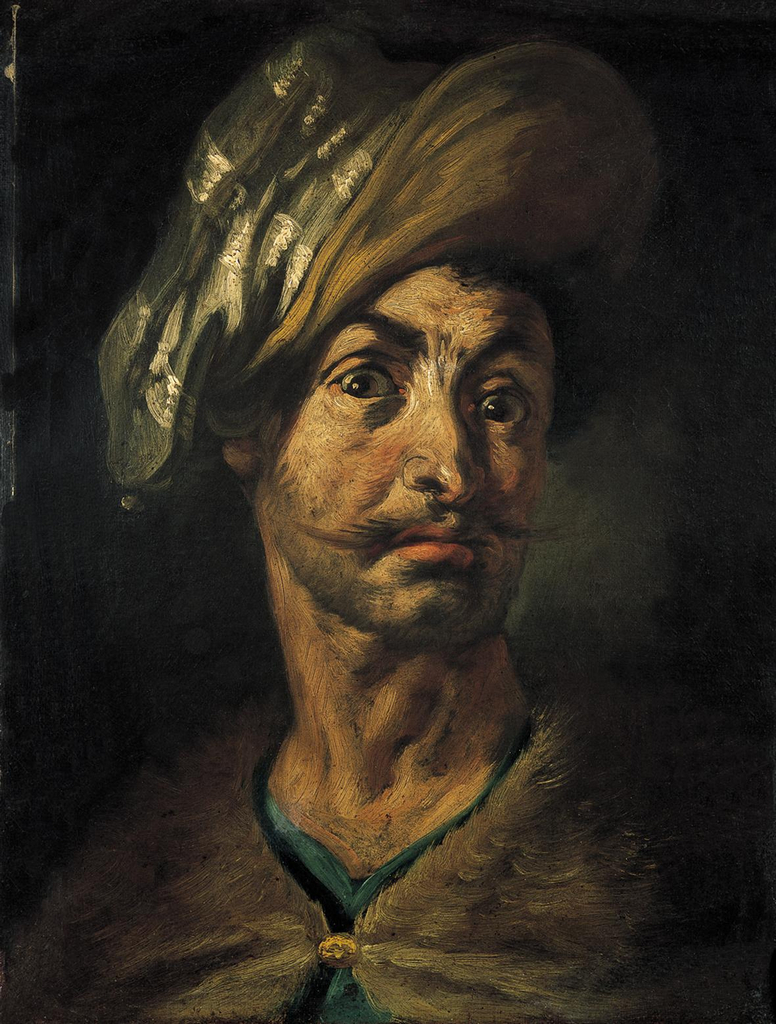
Man with turban, 1608–1610, priv. col.

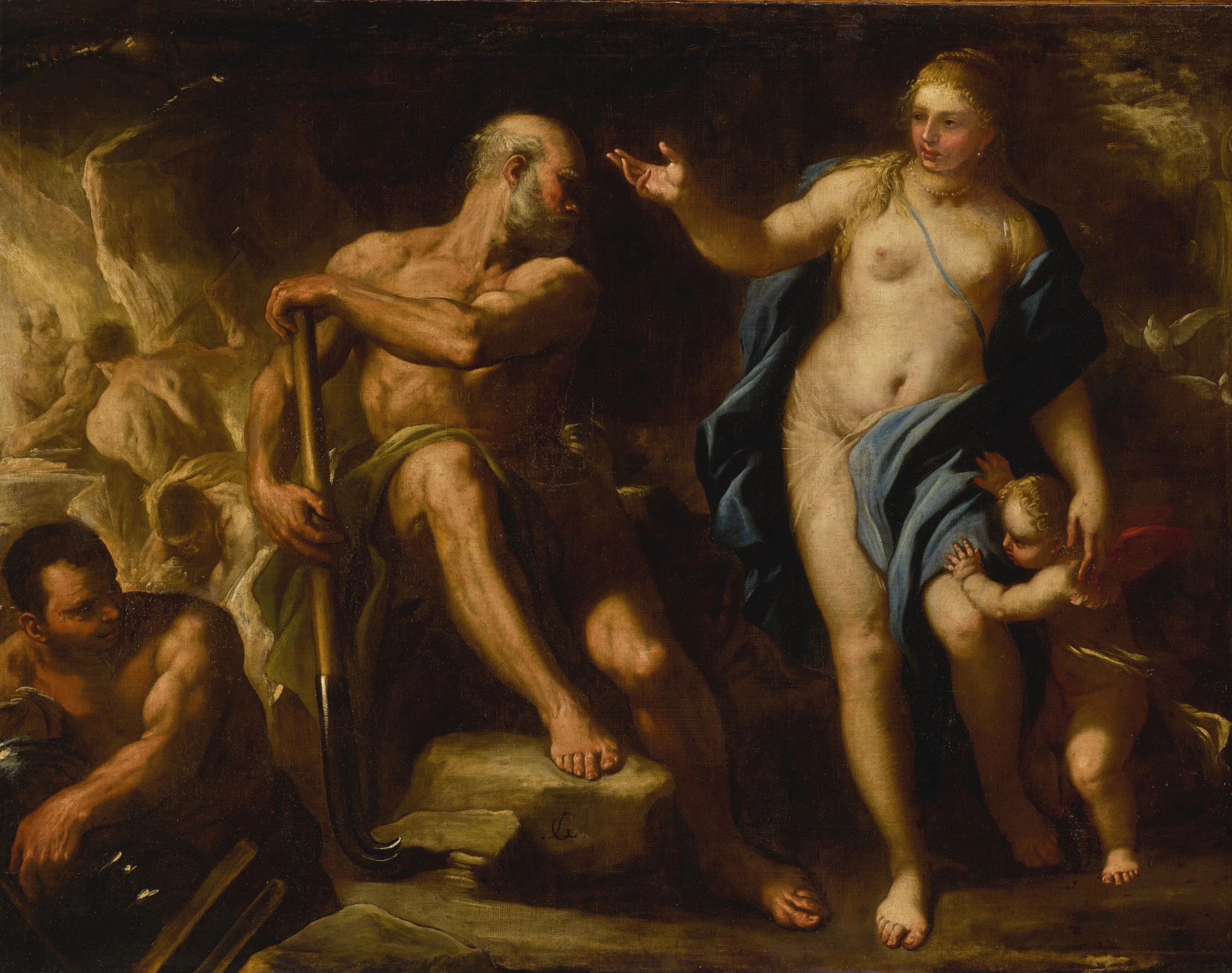
Venus at Vulcan's Forge, priv. col.

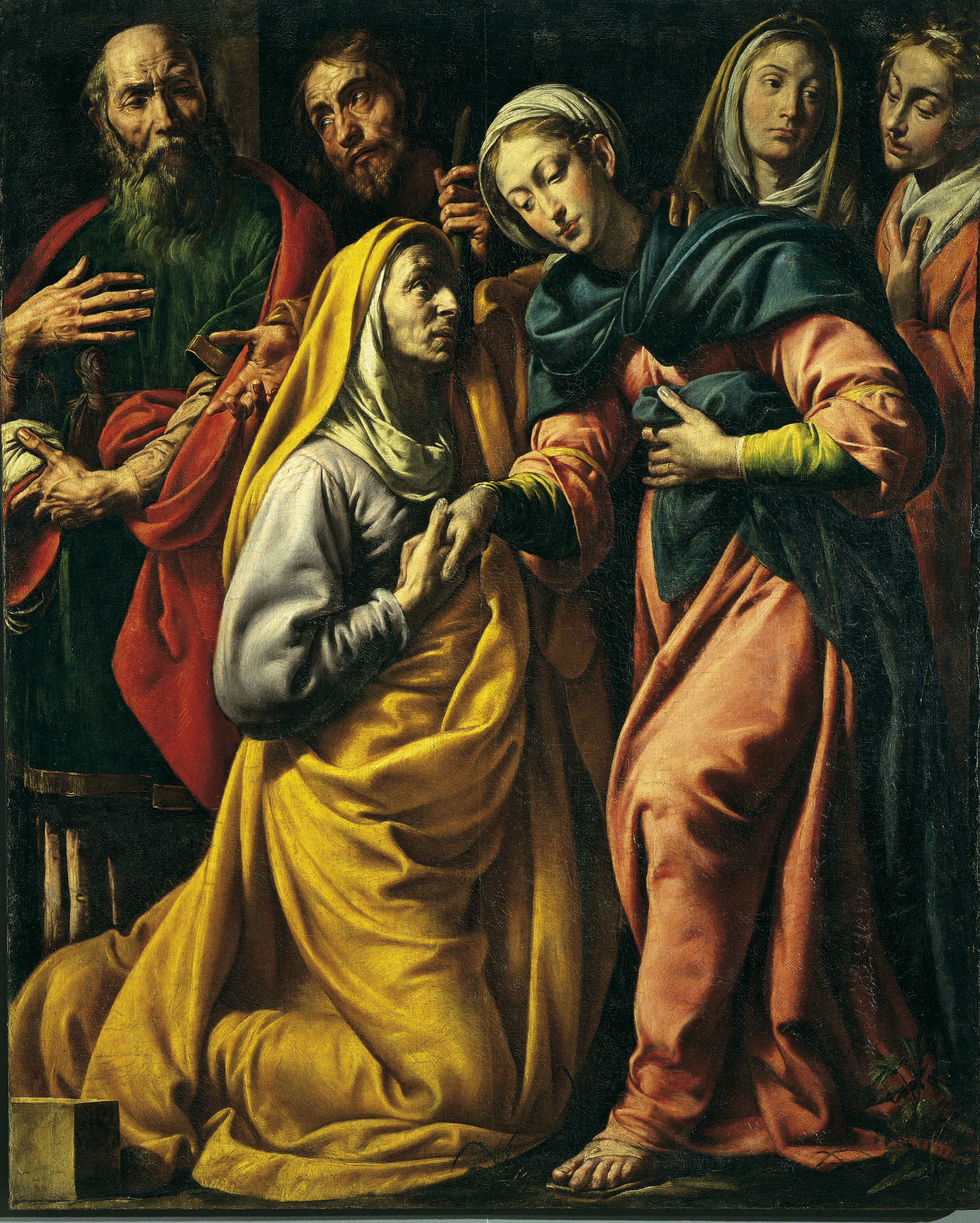
Visitation c. 1627, parish church, Vagna

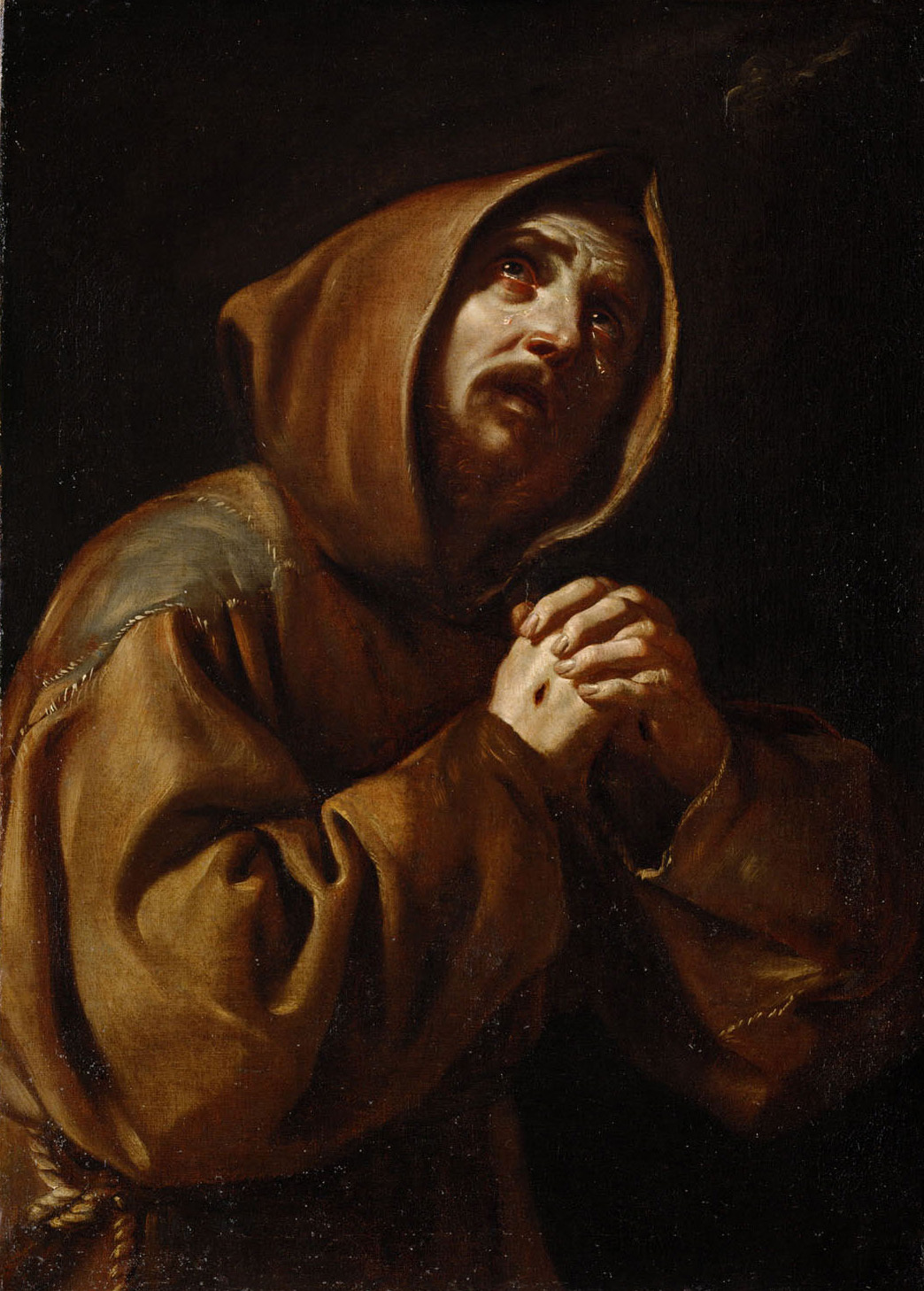
St. Francis, Kunsthistorisches Museum, c. 1630, Vienna

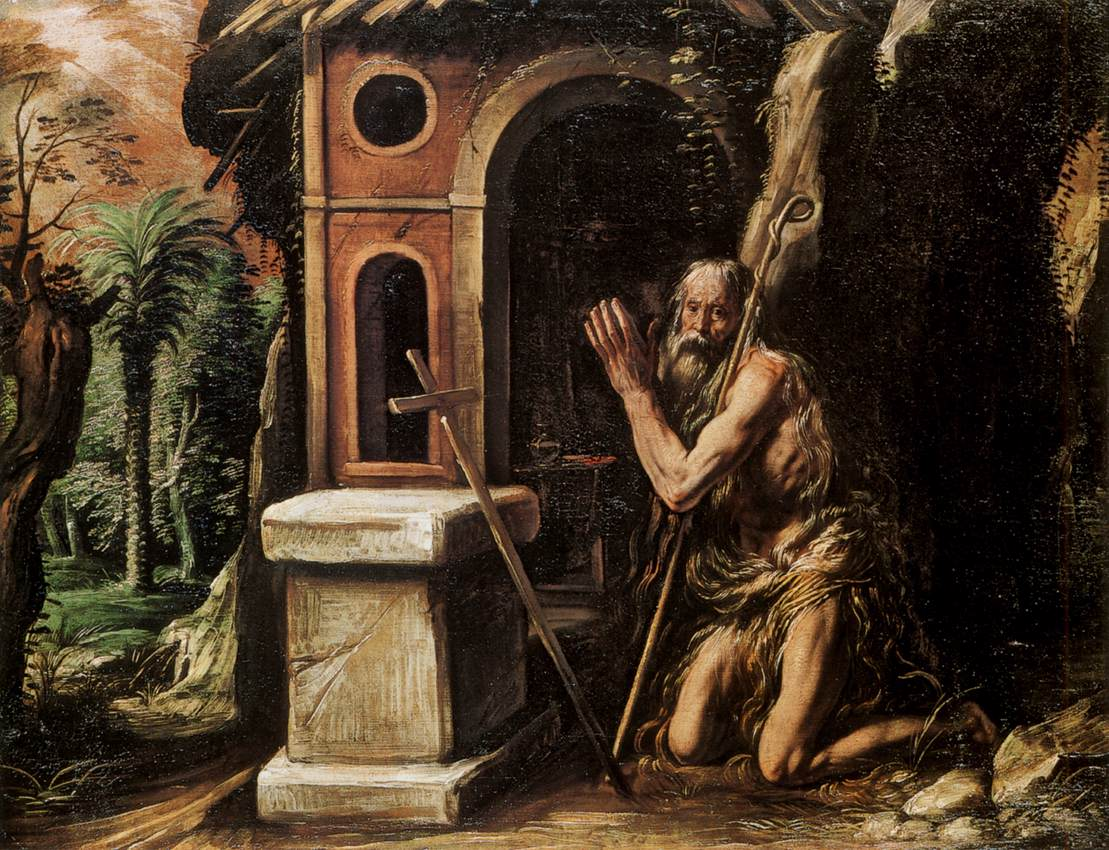
St. Onuphrius, c. 1632, priv. col.

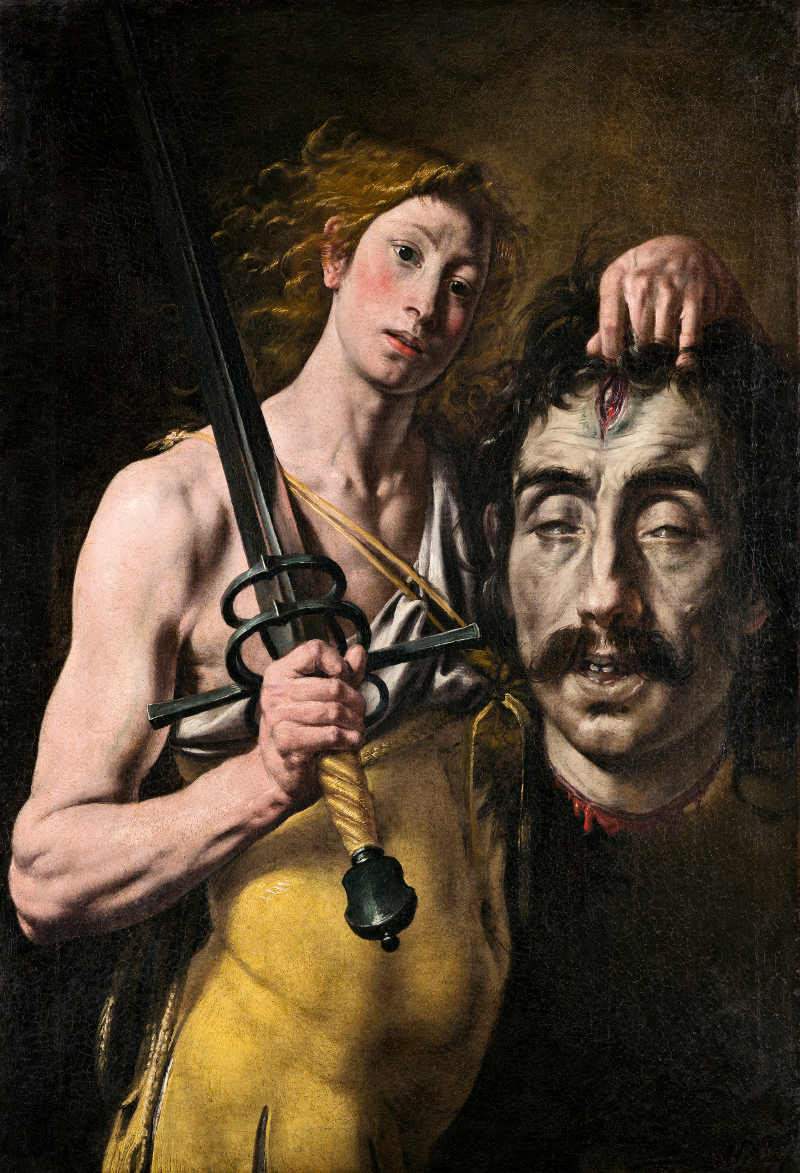
David with the head of Goliath, c. 1617-1624 (Pinacoteca civica, Varallo)

== Sources ==
- Wittkower, Rudolf (1993). Pelican History of Art (ed.). Art and Architecture in Italy, 1600–1750. 1980. Penguin Books. pp. 102–104.
- Artnet biography from Grove Encyclopedia of Art.
- Parts of this article were derived from its counterpart in the Italian Wikipedia, specifically from this version which provides the following bibliography:
  - Giovanni Testori, Il manierismo piemontese e lombardo del Seicento, 1955, catalogo della Mostra, Torino-Ivrea;
  - Giovanni Testori, Tanzio da Varallo, catalogo della mostra, Torino, 1959 (ora in G. Testori, La realtà della Pittura, Longanesi, Milano, 1995);
  - Marco Bona Castellotti, Introduzione alla mostra, in "Tanzio da Varallo. Realismo, fervore e contemplazione in un pittore del Seicento", Milano, Federico Motta Editore, 2000, (Catalogo della mostra su Tanzio tenuta a Milano, Palazzo Reale);
  - Filippo Maria Ferro, Tanzio e l’Angelo, ibidem;
  - Elena De Filippis, Tanzio al Sacro Monte, ibidem;
