= Girolamo Cattaneo =

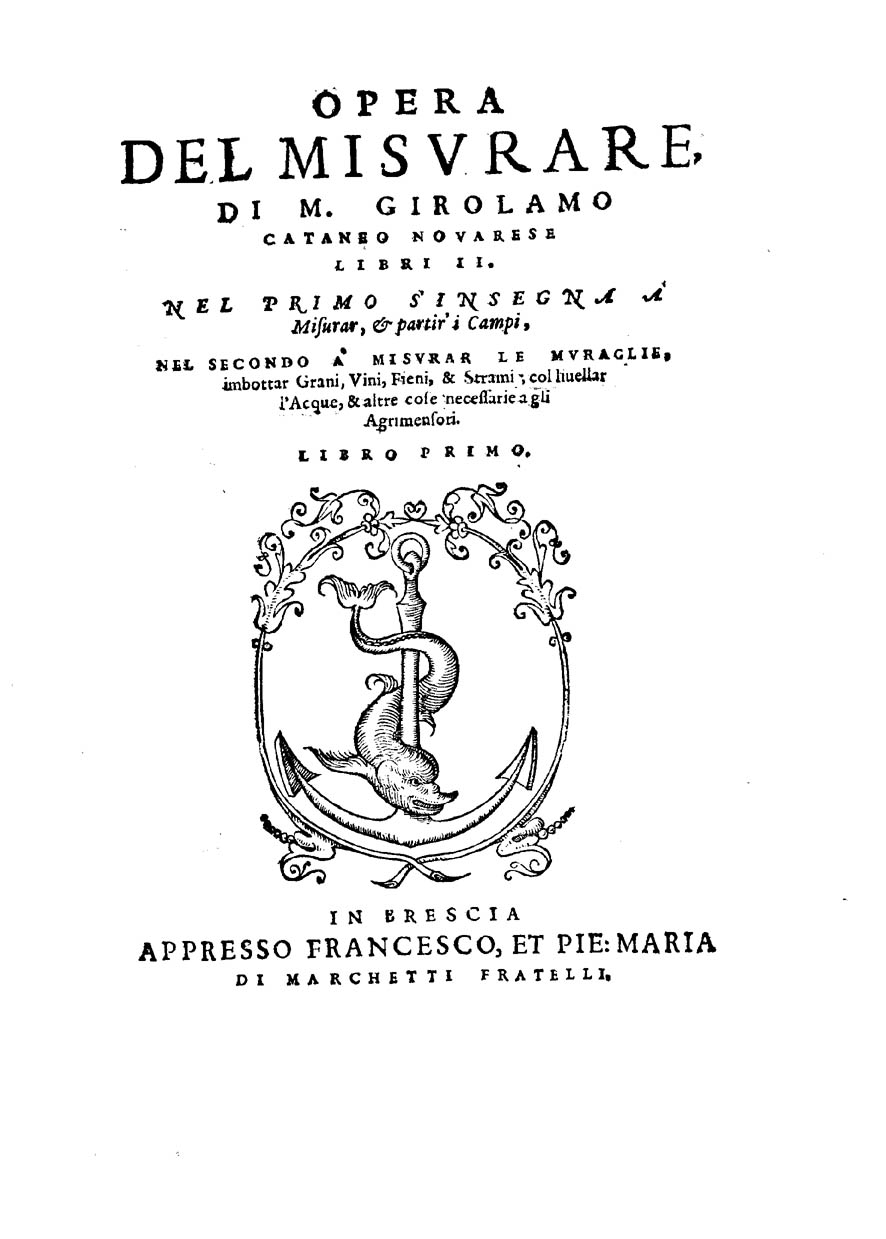
Dell'arte del misurare, vol. 1, 1572

Girolamo Cattaneo (active 1540–1584) was an Italian military writer who in his lifetime was regarded as one of the foremost masters of military architecture.

== Life ==
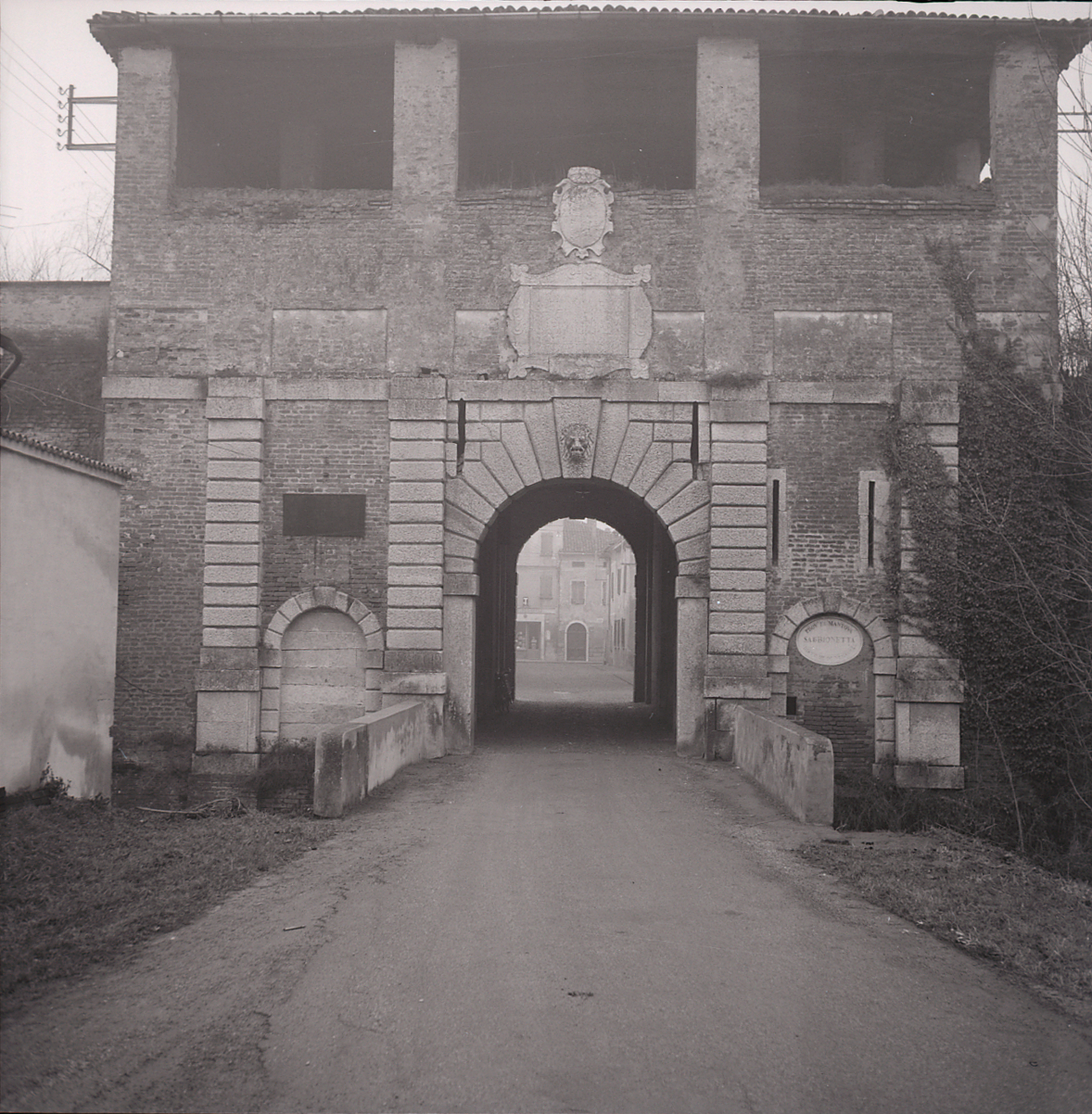
Porta Vittoria, Sabbioneta. Photo by Paolo Monti, 1965

Cattaneo was born in Novara, northern Italy, but his background is otherwise unknown. It is posited that he must have had considerable training in mathematics and geometry, given his knowledge of hydraulics, surveying, and ballistics. He was a military architect and worked predominantly in Mantua and Brescia. He worked for Vespasiano I Gonzaga, duke of Sabbioneta, whom he advised on the construction of a new fortification, in particular the two city gates ("Porta Vittoria" and "Porta Imperiale") and the defensive wall of Sabbioneta.

== Works ==
- Rote perpetue, per le quali si può con qual numero di due dadi si voglia, ovvero con due dadi secondo l'horologio d'Italia ritrovar quando si fa la luna (in Italian). Brescia: Francesco Marchetti. 1562.
- Opera nuova di fortificare, offendere e difendere (in Italian). Brescia: Tommaso Bozzola. 1567.
- Cattaneo, Girolamo (1567). Tavole brevissime per sapere con prestezza quante file vanno a formare una giustissima battaglia (in Italian). In Brescia: Tommaso Bozzola.
- Nuovo ragionamento del fabricare le fortezze (in Italian). Brescia: Francesco Marchetti & Pietro Maria Marchetti. 1571.
- Cattaneo, Girolamo (1574). Le capitaine de Ierosme Cataneo, contenant la maniere de fortifier places, & defendre (in French). A Lyon: par Iean de Tournes imprimeur du roy.
- Dell’arte del misurare (in Italian). Brescia: Tommaso Bozzola. 1584.
  - Dell'arte del misurare (in Italian). Vol. 2. Brescia: Francesco Marchetti & Pietro Maria Marchetti. 1572.
- Cattaneo, Girolamo (1584). Dell’arte del misurare. Libro secondo, Del misurare le muraglie (in Italian). In Brescia: Tommaso Bozzola.
- Cattaneo, Girolamo (1584). Dell'arte militare libri cinque, ne' quali si tratta il modo di fortificare, offendere, et diffendere una fortezza; et l'ordine come si debano faregli alloggiamenti campali, et formarle battaglie, et nell'ultimo l'essamine de bombardieri et di far fuochi arteficiati (in Italian). Brescia: Pietro Maria Marchetti.
