= Roberto Passarin =

Italian footballer

Personal information
- Date of birth: 7 July 1934
- Place of birth: Novara, Italy
- Date of death: 5 April 1982 (aged 47)
- Position: Midfielder

Senior career*
Years	Team	Apps	(Gls)
1951–1954	Novara	27	(2)
1954–1955	Internazionale	13	(2)
1955–1956	Triestina	27	(3)
1956–1957	Palermo	16	(1)
1957–1958	Lecco	14	(4)
1958–1959	Alessandria	4	(0)
1959–1960	Novara	26	(0)
1960–1963	Casale	68	(1)
1964–1967	Toronto Italia	75	(?)
- * Club domestic league appearances and goals

Roberto Passarin (7 July 1934 – 5 April 1982) was an Italian professional football player. He was born in Novara.

In 1964, he played abroad in the Eastern Canada Professional Soccer League with Toronto Italia.
