= Novara =

- Comune
- Comune di Novara
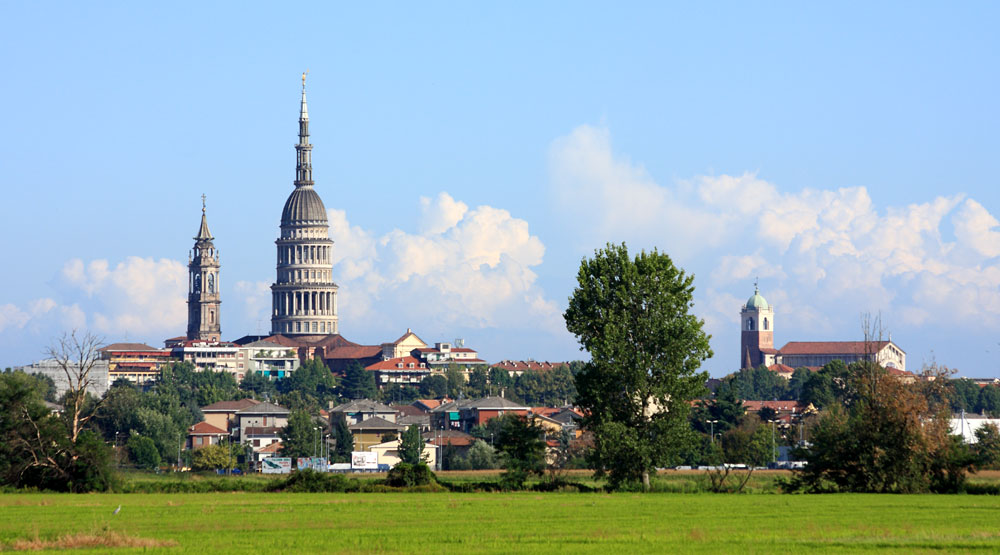
- A panorama of Novara, showing the Basilica of San Gaudenzio, with its campanile and cupola, and Novara Cathedral

- Flag Coat of arms

- Location within Piedmont Location within Italy Location within Europe
- Coordinates: 45.45°N 8.62°E
- Country: Italy
- Region: Piedmont
- Province: Novara (NO)
- Frazioni: Lumellogno, Agognate, Bicocca Di Novara, Casalgiate, Olengo, Pernate, Sant'Agabio, Torrion Quartara, Veveri, Vignale, Gionzana, Pagliate

Government
  - Mayor: Alessandro Canelli (Right-wing coalition)

Area
  - Total: 103.05 km^{2} (39.79 sq mi)
- Elevation: 162 m (531 ft)

Population (2026)
  - Total: 103,238
  - Density: 1,001.8/km^{2} (2,594.7/sq mi)
- Demonym: Novarese(i)
- Time zone: UTC+1 (CET)
  - Summer (DST): UTC+2 (CEST)
- Postal code: 28100
- Dialing code: 0321
- Patron saint: Saint Gaudentius
- Saint day: 22 January
- Website: Official website

Novara (Italian: [noˈvaːra]; Novarese: [nuˈ(ʋ)aːra]) is the capital city of the province of Novara in the region of Piedmont in northern Italy, to the west of Milan. With a population of 103,238, it is the second largest city in Piedmont after Turin as of 2026.

It is an important crossroads for commercial traffic along the routes from Milan to Turin and from Genoa to Switzerland.

Novara lies between the streams Agogna and Terdoppio in northeastern Piedmont, 50 km (31 mi) from Milan and 95 km (59 mi) from Turin. It is only 15 km (9.3 mi) from the river Ticino, which marks the border with the Lombardy region.

== History ==
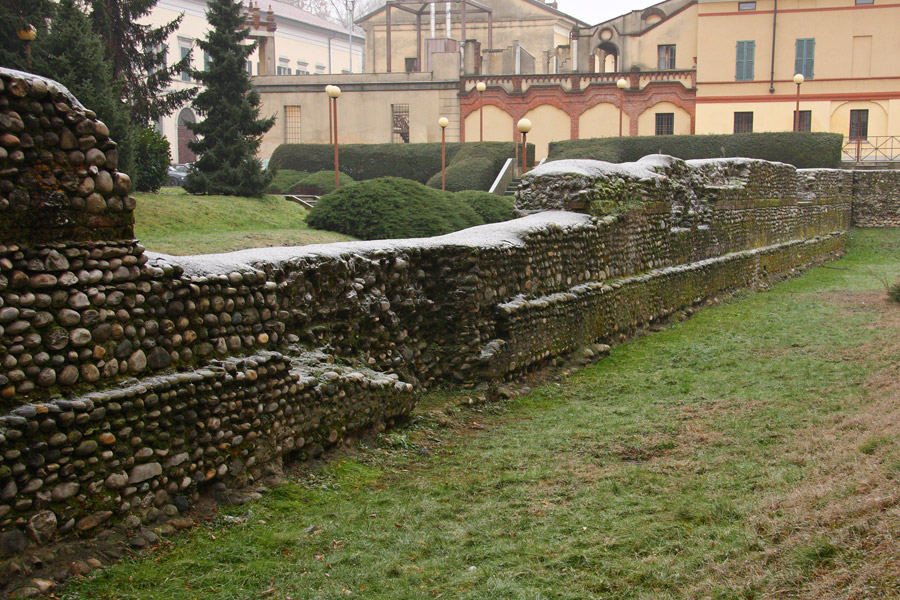
Roman walls in Novara.

Novara was founded around 89 BC by the Romans, when the local Gauls obtained Roman citizenship. Its name is formed from Nov, meaning "new", and Aria, the name the Cisalpine Gauls used for the surrounding region.

Ancient Novaria, which dates to the time of the Ligures and the Celts, was a municipium and was situated on the road from Vercellae (Vercelli) to (Mediolanum) Milan. Its position on perpendicular roads (still intact today) dates to the time of the Romans. After the city was destroyed in 386 by Magnus Maximus for having supported his rival Valentinian II, it was rebuilt by Theodosius I. Subsequently, it was sacked by Radagaisus (in 405) and Attila (in 452).

Under the Lombards, Novara became a duchy; under Charles the Fat, a countship. Novara came to enjoy the rights of a free imperial city. In 1110, it was conquered by Henry V and destroyed, but in 1167 it joined the Lombard League. At the end of the 12th century, it accepted the protection of Milan and became practically a dominion of the Visconti and later of the Sforza. In the Battle of Novara in 1513, Swiss mercenaries defending Novara for the Sforzas of Milan routed the French troops besieging the city. This defeat ended the French invasion of Italy in the War of the League of Cambrai.

In 1706, Novara, which had long ago been promised by Filippo Maria Visconti to Amadeus VIII of Savoy, was occupied by Savoyard troops. With the Peace of Utrecht, the city, together with Milan, became part of the Habsburg Empire. After its occupation in 1734, Novara passed, in the following year, to the House of Savoy.

After Napoleon's campaign in Italy, Novara became the capital of the Department of the Agogna, but was then reassigned to the House of Savoy in 1814. In 1821, it was the site of a battle in which regular Sardinian troops defeated the Piedmontese constitutional liberals. In the even larger Battle of Novara in 1849, the Sardinian army was defeated by the Austrian army of Field Marshal Joseph Radetzky von Radetz. This defeat led to the abdication of Charles Albert of Sardinia and to the partial occupation of the city by the Austrians. The defeat of the Sardinians can be seen as the beginning of the Italian unification movement.

A decree in 1859 created the province of Novara, which then included the present-day provinces of Vercelli, Biella, and Verbano-Cusio-Ossola.

The city of Novara had a population of 25,144 in 1861. Industrialisation during the 20th century brought an increase in the city's population to 102,088 in 1981. The city's population has changed little in subsequent years.

Oscar Luigi Scalfaro, former president of Italy and Italian senator for life, was born in Novara in 1918.

During World War II, the Stalag 365 German prisoner-of-war camp was relocated from Włodzimierz in German-occupied Poland to Novara in September 1943. It held Italian POWs and was dissolved in March 1944.

The city was the setting for the 1971 film "The Working Class Goes to Heaven" by Elio Petri; the film was presented at Cannes Film Festival and has won multiple awards; its soundtrack was composed by Ennio Morricone, who also appears in a cameo.

== Climate ==
Climate data for Novara, Cameri (1991–2020, extremes 1960–present)
Month	Jan	Feb	Mar	Apr	May	Jun	Jul	Aug	Sep	Oct	Nov	Dec	Year
Record high °C (°F)	20.7 (69.3)	25.9 (78.6)	28.6 (83.5)	32.2 (90.0)	33.7 (92.7)	37.9 (100.2)	38.3 (100.9)	38.1 (100.6)	37.8 (100.0)	30.9 (87.6)	22.2 (72.0)	21.1 (70.0)	38.3 (100.9)
Mean daily maximum °C (°F)	6.8 (44.2)	9.4 (48.9)	14.4 (57.9)	17.9 (64.2)	22.3 (72.1)	26.7 (80.1)	29.1 (84.4)	28.7 (83.7)	24.1 (75.4)	17.9 (64.2)	11.6 (52.9)	7.2 (45.0)	18.0 (64.4)
Daily mean °C (°F)	2.2 (36.0)	3.9 (39.0)	8.4 (47.1)	12.2 (54.0)	16.8 (62.2)	21.1 (70.0)	23.2 (73.8)	22.9 (73.2)	18.4 (65.1)	13.1 (55.6)	7.4 (45.3)	2.8 (37.0)	12.7 (54.9)
Mean daily minimum °C (°F)	−1.9 (28.6)	−1.2 (29.8)	2.5 (36.5)	6.5 (43.7)	11.2 (52.2)	15.3 (59.5)	17.3 (63.1)	17.3 (63.1)	13.1 (55.6)	8.6 (47.5)	3.4 (38.1)	−1.1 (30.0)	7.6 (45.7)
Record low °C (°F)	−19.4 (−2.9)	−15.2 (4.6)	−11.1 (12.0)	−5.0 (23.0)	−1.8 (28.8)	3.2 (37.8)	6.6 (43.9)	4.5 (40.1)	1.6 (34.9)	−7.6 (18.3)	−10.0 (14.0)	−13.8 (7.2)	−19.4 (−2.9)
Average precipitation mm (inches)	41.1 (1.62)	45.8 (1.80)	46.9 (1.85)	72.0 (2.83)	93.3 (3.67)	59.8 (2.35)	43.7 (1.72)	64.1 (2.52)	80.8 (3.18)	87.9 (3.46)	112.2 (4.42)	49.9 (1.96)	796.6 (31.36)
Average precipitation days (≥ 1.0 mm)	3.9	3.6	4.0	7.0	7.8	5.6	4.5	5.3	5.7	6.8	7.4	4.8	66.3
Average relative humidity (%)	78.2	72.1	67.8	68.1	69.4	69.0	68.0	69.7	71.2	77.0	80.5	79.8	72.6
Source 1: NOAA
Source 2: Servizio Meteorologico

== Demographics ==
Historical population
Year	Pop.	±%
1861	25,144	—
1871	29,674	+18.0%
1881	32,782	+10.5%
1901	44,249	+35.0%
1911	53,657	+21.3%
1921	55,447	+3.3%
1931	60,855	+9.8%
1936	62,570	+2.8%
1951	69,395	+10.9%
1961	87,704	+26.4%
1971	100,687	+14.8%
1981	102,086	+1.4%
1991	101,112	−1.0%
2001	100,910	−0.2%
2011	101,952	+1.0%
2021	101,367	−0.6%
Source: ISTAT

As of 2026, the population is 103,238, of which 49.0% are male and 51.0% are female. Minors make up 14.5% of the population, and seniors make up 25.3%.

=== Immigration ===
As of 2025, immigrants make up 18.9% of the population. The 5 largest foreign countries of birth are Morocco, Albania, Pakistan, Ukraine, and Peru.

Foreign population by country of birth (2025)
Country of birth	Population
Morocco	2,129
Albania	1,940
Pakistan	1,843
Ukraine	1,401
Peru	1,026
Romania	919
Bangladesh	825
Nigeria	717
Tunisia	715
India	539
Egypt	489
Turkey	468
China	410
Senegal	400
Brazil	361

== Government ==
The current mayor of Novara is Alessandro Canelli, elected in June 2016 and confirmed in October 2021, representing a coalition between traditional right-wing parties such as Forza Italia and the new far-right composed by Lega (political party) and Brothers of Italy.

=== Administrative subdivisions ===
Novara is divided into thirteen wards (circoscrizioni); several of these are formed of a number of quarters (quartieri), zones, and/or frazioni.

According to changes in local electoral laws, from June 2011 elections, they were stripped of their elective bodies (council and president), thus remaining as a simple internal partition of the Comune.

- Centro (Historic Centre)
- Nord est (North East)
  - Sant’Andrea (quartiere)
  - San Rocco (quartiere)
- Nord (North)
  - Sant’Antonio (quartiere)
  - Vignale (frazione)
  - Veveri (frazione)
- Sant’Agabio
- Porta Mortara
- Sacro Cuore
- San Martino
- Santa Rita
- Ovest (West)
  - San Paolo (quartiere)
  - Zona Agogna (zone)
- Sud (South)
  - Cittadella (quartiere)
  - Rizzotaglia (quartiere)
  - Villagio Dalmazia (quartiere)
  - Torrion Quartara (frazione)
- Sud est (South East)
  - Bicocca (quartiere)
  - Olengo (frazione)
- Lumellogno
  - Lumellogno (frazione)
  - Casalgiate (frazione)
  - Pagliate (frazione)
  - Gionzana (frazione)
- Pernate

== Architecture ==
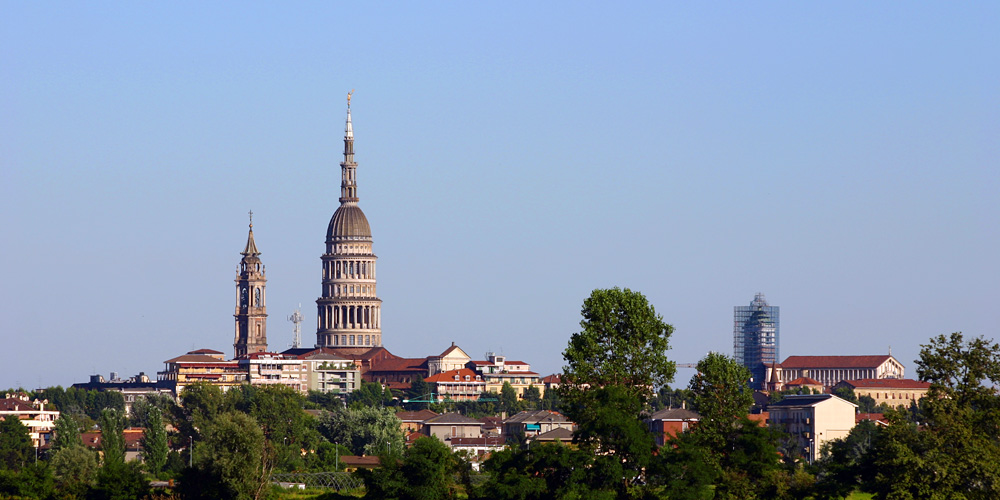
View of Novara

Novara's sights can be divided into two groupings. The city's most important sights lie within its historic centre, the area once enclosed by the city walls. However, several important sights also lie outside the line of the former city walls.

Novara has numerous churches and historic buildings; some of these have been restored over the years. The most significant architectural element is the majestic dome, 121 metres high, designed by the architect-engineer Alessandro Antonelli. Now known as the Basilica of San Gaudenzio, it was built in 1888. It has now become a symbol of the city and a distinctive sign of its panorama, observable from all the roads that lead to the city. The bell tower is also of particular interest; it was designed by Benedetto Alfieri, uncle of the more famous Vittorio Alfieri.

=== Historic centre ===
The old urban core makes up the "Historic centre", situated in the district of the same name. Novara once had an encircling wall, which was demolished to permit urban development. Of the old wall, there remains only the Barriera Albertina, a complex of two neo-classical buildings that constituted the gate of entry to the city, the required passageway for those who travelled from Turin to Milan. After their removal, the walls were replaced by the present-day baluardi, the broad, tree-lined boulevards that surround the Historic Centre.

The centre of the religious life of the city is the Novara Cathedral, in the neo-classical style, also designed by Alessandro Antonelli. It rises exactly where the temple of Jupiter stood in the time of the Romans. Facing the Duomo is the oldest building in Novara today: the early Christian Battistero (Baptistry).

Close to the Duomo is the courtyard of the Broletto (the historic meeting place of the city council), the centre of the political life of the imperial free city of Novara. Overlooking the courtyard of the Broletto are the Palazzo del Podestà ("Palace of the Podestà"), Palazzetto dei Paratici ("Little Palace of the Paratici Family"), site of the Civic Museum and of the Gallery of Modern Art, the Palace of the City Council, and a building of the 15th century.

Not far from the Piazza della Repubblica (formerly Piazza Duomo) is the Piazza Cesare Battisti (known to Novaresi as the Piazza delle Erbe, "Herbs square"), which constitutes the exact centre of the city of Novara.

In Piazza Giacomo Matteotti stands the Palazzo Natta-Isola, seat of the province and of the prefecture of Novara. The landmark feature of this palace is its clock tower. Extending from this square is the via Fratelli Rosselli, along which is the Palazzo Cabrino, the official seat of the administrative offices of the city. As it was a Roman city, the street network of Novara is characterized by a cardo and a Decumanus Maximus, which correspond respectively to the present-day Corso Cavour and Corso Italia. The two streets cross at the so-called "Angolo delle Ore" (Corner of the Hours).

The city conservatory, Conservatorio Guido Cantelli, named after Novara's Guido Cantelli, is located in via Collegio Gallarini, 1 (facing largo Luigi Sante Colonna in the area between piazza Puccini and Novara's hospital). The conservatory, founded in 1996, was established in a building built in the 1700s, once known as the casone. In 1766, the building, after a donation from the Gallarini family, started to be used as a college. Between 1854 and 1905, several artistic features, such as coloured tiles and terracotta decorations on the facade were added.

The largest square is Piazza Martiri della Libertà (formerly Piazza Castello) dominated by the equestrian statue of Victor Emmanuel II, the first king of Italy. Overlooking the Piazza Martiri is the Castello Visconteo-Sforzesco, built by the Milanese dukes Visconti and Sforza, and the Teatro Coccia. The Castello Visconteo-Sforzesco, once much larger than the complex that remains today, is surrounded by the Allea, one of the largest public gardens in Novara.

Other important squares are:

- Largo Cavour, dominated by the statue of Cavour, recently restored.
- Piazza Garibaldi, the square facing the Novara Railway Station, also recently restored and featuring the statue of the hero of two worlds and a fountain with the statue of a mondina.
- Piazza Gramsci, formerly Piazza del Rosario, location, after the restoration of 2005, of the landmark statue of Icarus.
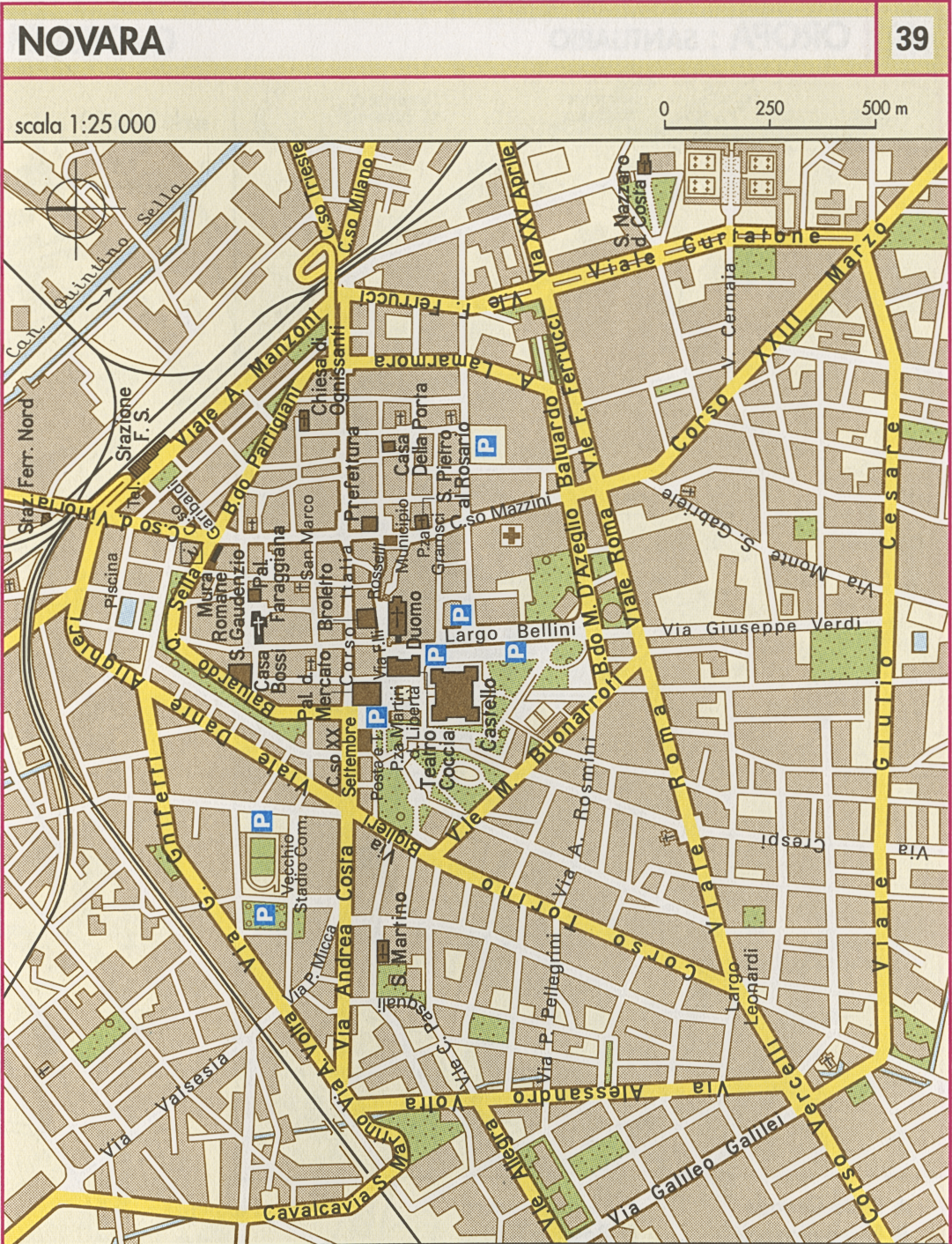
Map of the city centre

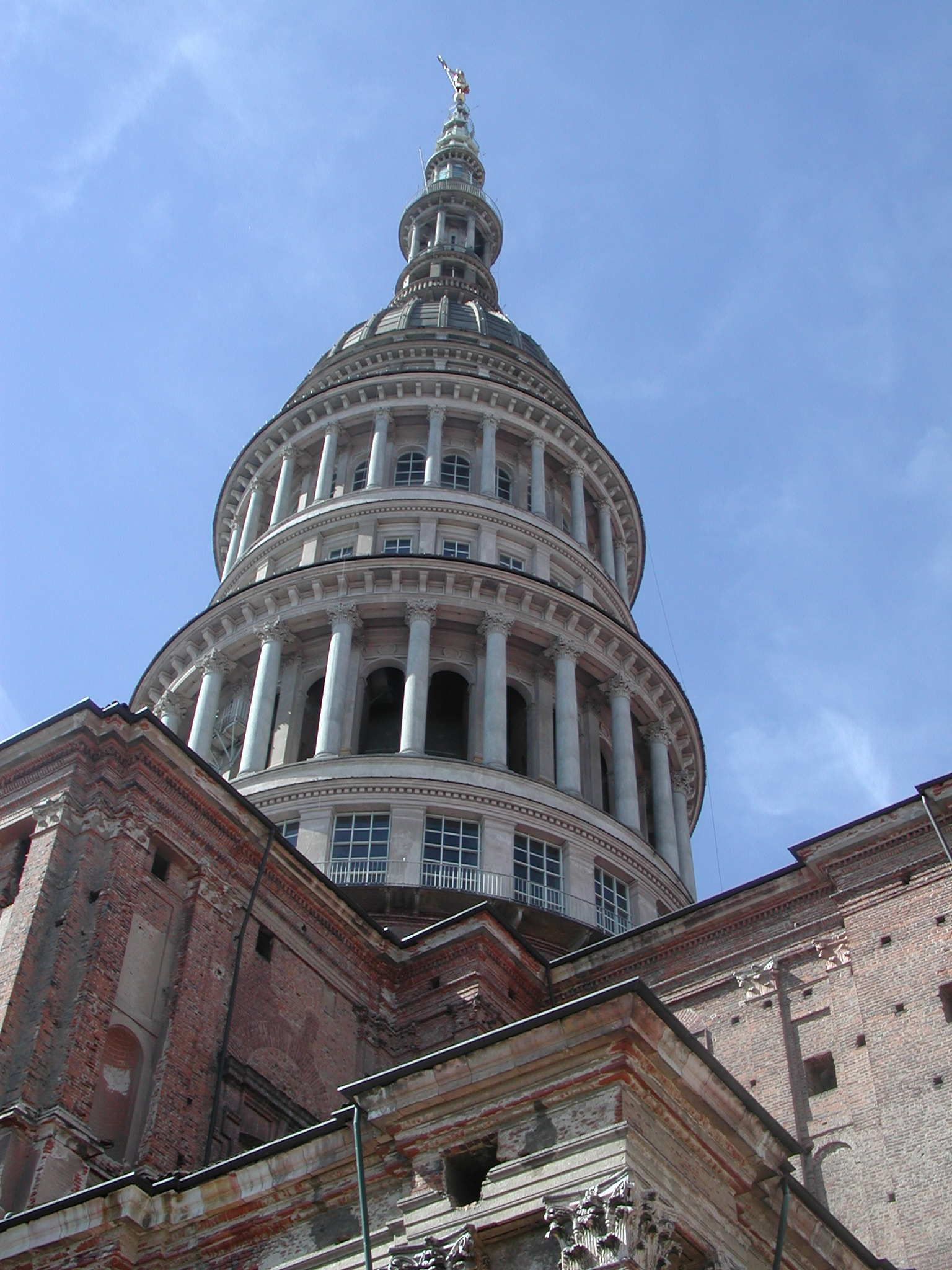
The cupola of the Basilica of San Gaudenzio, symbol of Novara, is 121 m (397 ft) high.

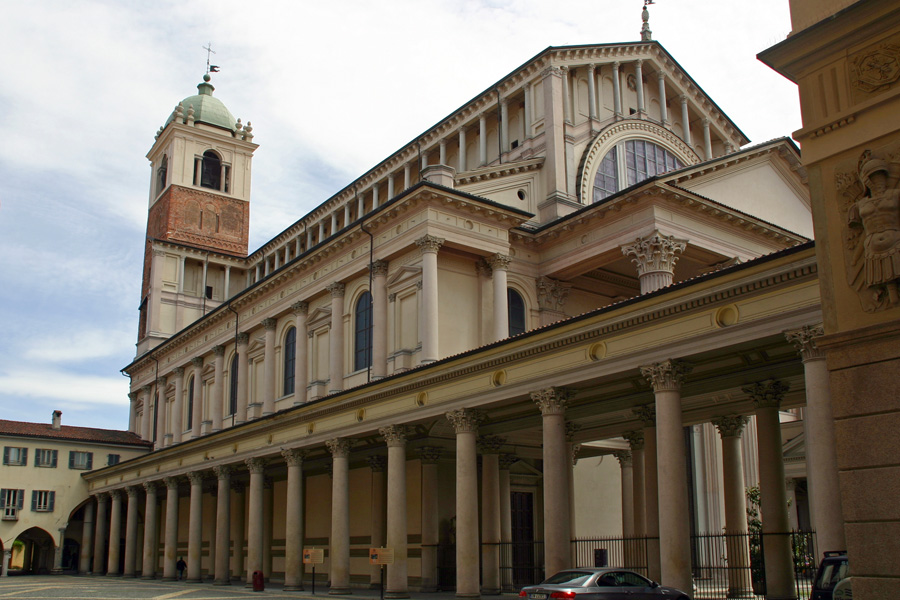
Novara Cathedral

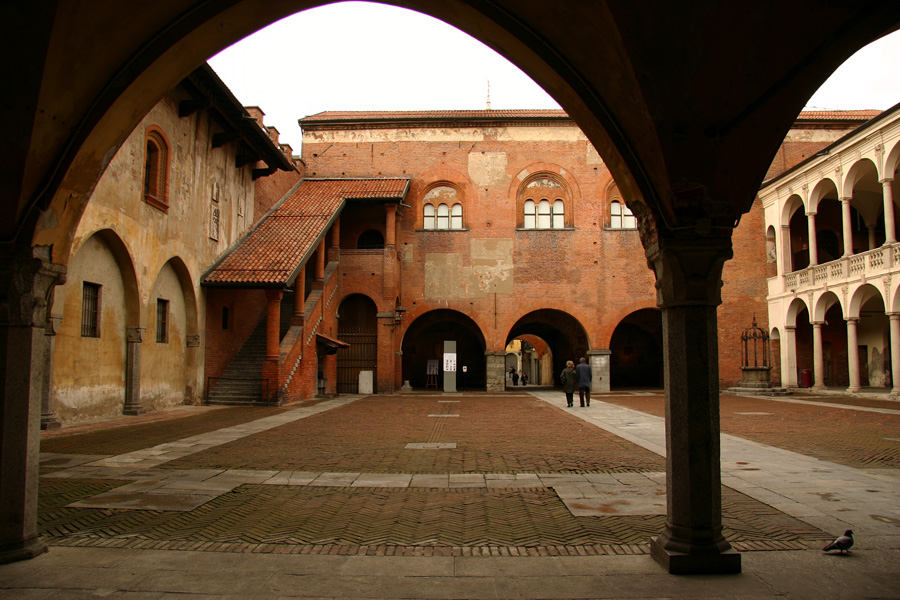
The Broletto

=== Outside the Baluardi ===
Places of interest situated outside the belt of the baluardi include the Church of San Nazzaro della Costa, with its attached abbey, restored in the 15th century by Bernardino of Siena, and the Ossuary of Bicocca, in pyramidal form, which stands in the neighbourhood of Bicocca, in memory of the fallen soldiers of the historic battle of 23 March 1849, between the Piedmontese (Sardinia) and Austrians. Worthy of note are the Church of Santa Maria delle Grazie (Saints Martino and Gaudenzio), built beginning in 1477 by the Augustinians, whose interior consists of a single nave with lateral chapels and paintings attributed to artists of the 15th century, among them Daniele de Bosis.

=== Religious buildings ===
- Chiesa di Ognissanti (12th century)
- Santa Maria delle Grazie, also known as San Martino (15th century)
- San Pietro al Rosario (1599–1618)
- San Marco (17th century)
- Oratory of San Giovanni Decollato (17th century)
- Santa Maria della Salute (17th century)
- Sant'Eufemia (17th century)
- Chiesa del Carmine (18th to 19th centuries)
- Nuova Chiesa di San Rocco (21st century)

== Culture ==
The city of Novara is home to the Geographical Institute De Agostini, which celebrated its centenary in 2001.

=== Festival and events ===
- 22 January: Novara celebrates annually the Feast of San Gaudenzio (Saint Gaudentius of Novara), the patron saint of Novara. Throughout the day, it is possible to visit the tomb of the saint and to obtain the typical roasted chestnuts, also known as marroni di Cuneo ("Cuneo chestnuts").
- 23 March: Re-enactment of the 1849 Battle of Novara, with period uniforms and weapons.
- On 25 April, Liberation Day, as in many other Italian cities, the Novaresi organise numerous initiatives to commemorate the Italian resistance movement, and in particular, the partisans who fought around Novara and in the "Partisan Republic of the Ossola".
- Since 2001, Giovani Espressioni ("Young Expressions") has been held in Novara. This is a music festival for emerging young musicians, organised by Staff Millennium, a performance agency, of which Alessandro Marchetti is the artistic director. The "Espressioni Contest" is of special importance as a showcase for emerging bands that picks a winner every year. Among the noted artists who have participated are Negramaro, Caparezza, Finley, Vallanzaska, Extrema, and Blaze Bailey.
- Since 2005, Novara has hosted the "Novara Gospel Festival", which is composed of workshops, local tours, and obviously gospel concerts in the main theatre of the city. It is probably one of the most important festivals of this music in Italy, also because the main event is a concert of the most appreciated gospel singers, such as Kirk Franklin, Donnie McClurkin, etc.
- Circolando, a contemporary theatre and circus festival organised in collaboration with LaRibalta association featuring performances from live music to acrobatics.
- Fuori Novara, started in 2023, brings art to peripheral areas of the city.

== Economy ==
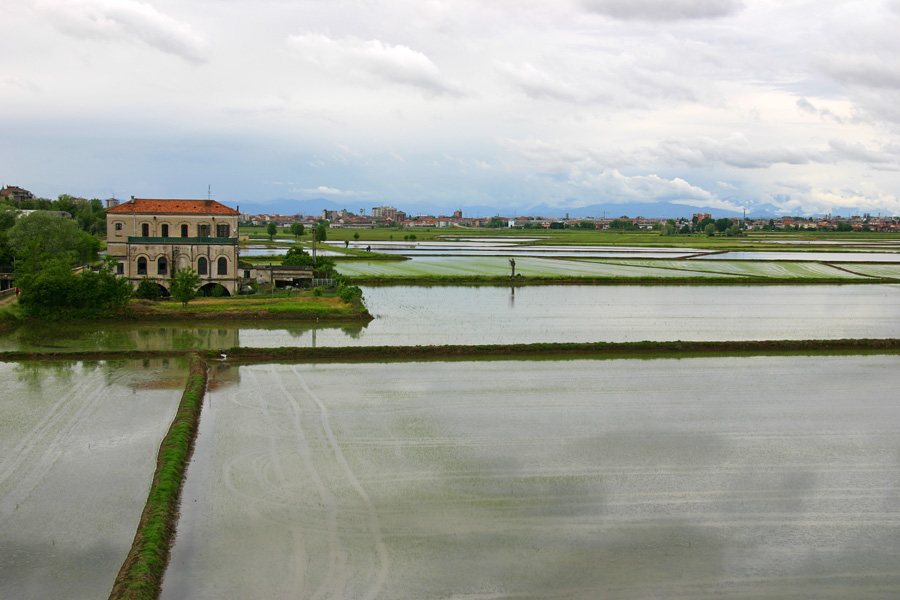
Rice fields around the city

Novara is a logistics and commercial centre in the northwestern part of the Padan plain and is the seat of the Centro Intermodale Merci (CIM: Goods Intermodal Centre). Economically, it is affected by the proximity of Milan, and in fact, many Milanese firms have offices in Novara.

The main economic products and services are:

- agriculture: rice and maize
- food products
- metallurgical production
- chemicals and petrochemicals
- pharmaceuticals
- intermodal commerce and logistics
- rice products exchange
- banking and insurance services

Novara is home to the publishing company De Agostini, which has been active in geographic and other publishing since 1901.

== Education ==
The city hosts one of the seats of the medicine school of the University of Eastern Piedmont (Università del Piemonte Orientale) in the Perrone campus.

== Research ==
- TERA Foundation for oncologic adrontherapy, founded in 1992 by Ugo Amaldi
- Eni Research Center
- Applied Research Center “Ipazia” located at the Centro di Ricerca Traslazionale sulle Malattie Autoimmuni e Allergiche (CAAD)
- Novara Sviluppo Foundation, Technical and Scientific Hub

== Transport ==
The local public transport agency is the SUN.

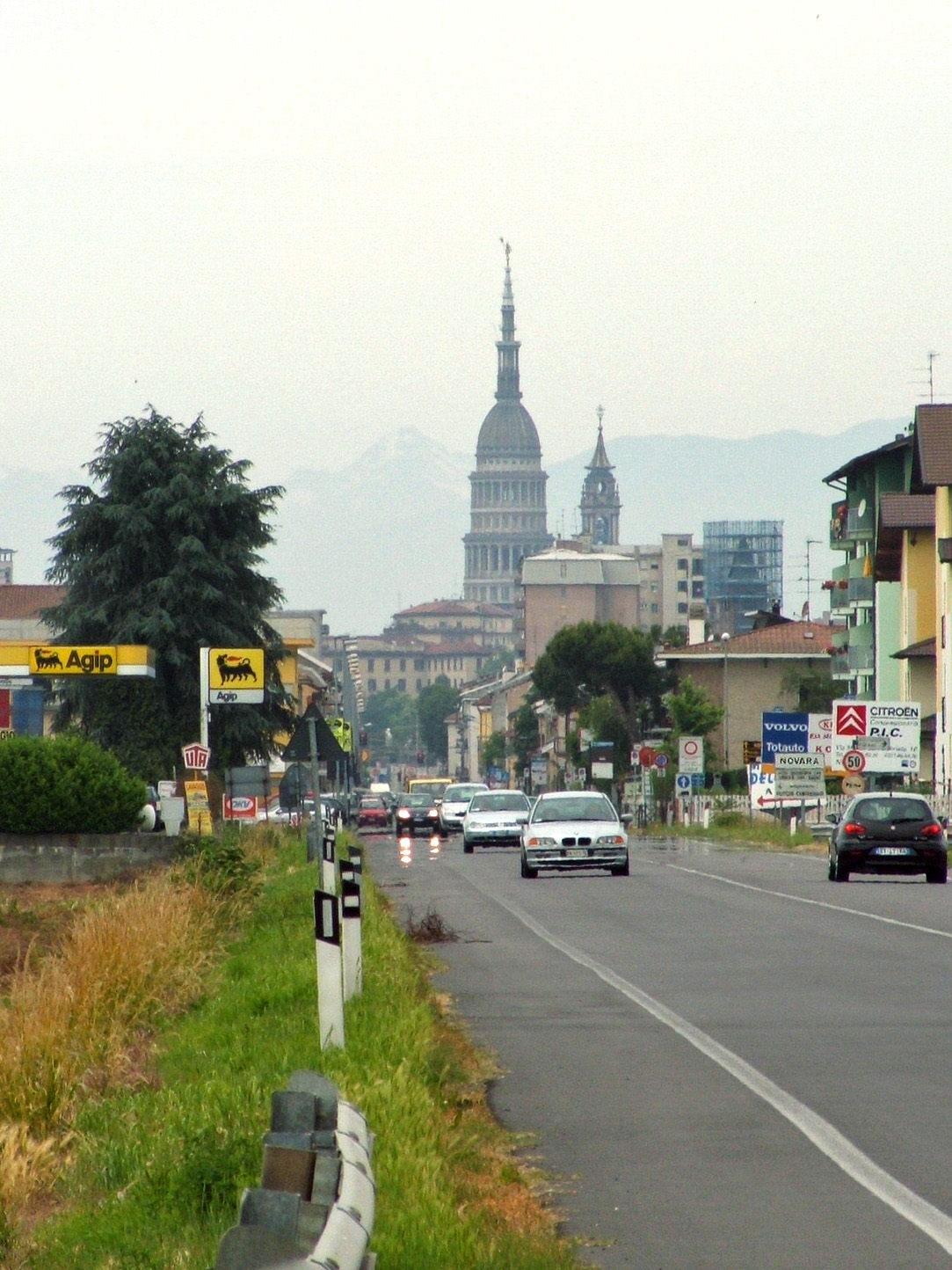
Novara seen from the S11 trunk road

=== Railways ===
The city is served by three railway stations:

- Vignale FS, a small station operated by the Ferrovie dello Stato (regional trains)
- Novara FS, the principal station of the Ferrovie dello Stato, Italy's national railway (regional, national and international trains).
- Novara Nord, the station operated by the LeNord railroad. The new station in via Leonardo da Vinci opened in 2005 (regional and high-speed trains (only 2006) trains).

=== Motorways and main roads ===
Novara is linked to Turin and Milan by the A4 motorway (via the junctions Novara Ovest and Novara Est). The A26 motorway crosses most of Novara province, but there is not a junction that links it directly with Novara. To reach Novara from the A26, one must exit at Vercelli Est, but one can also reach Novara by way of the A4, which crosses the A26 at a junction. Novara is served by a system of dual-carriageway bypasses. The oldest such bypass is the Tangenziale Est, directly linked with the motorway junction Novara Est. In 2003, road works were completed on the Tangenziale Sud.

The S11 trunk road from Milan and Magenta passes through Novara on its way to Vercelli and Turin. Trunk roads to the north and south also link Novara to the motorway network.

=== Air ===
There is no airport in the city. The nearest airport is Milan's Malpensa International Airport, located 34 km (21 mi) north east of Novara.

== Sport ==
Novara FC is an association football club based in Novara. There is a professional women's Serie A1 volleyball team, Igor Novara Volley.

There was an important baseball team and Hockey team.

== Notable people ==
- Alessandro Antonelli (1798–1888), architect
- Pietro Azario (1312–1366), notary and chronicler
- Cristina Barcellini (born 1986), volleyball player
- Gianni Bettini (1860–1938), inventor
- Lena Biolcati (born 1960), singer
- Carlo Emanuele Buscaglia (1915–1944), aviator
- Campano of Novara (c. 1220–1296), mathematician, astronomer, astrologer and physician
- Gaspare Campari (1828–1882), inventor
- Guido Cantelli (1920–1956), conductor
- Felice Casorati (1883–1963), painter
- Girolamo Cattaneo (1540–1584), military writer and architect
- Girardo Cavallazzi (fl. 1225–1247), troubadour
- Marchesa Colombi (1840–1920), writer
- Giovan Battista della Cerva (c. 1515–1580), painter
- Ardicino della Porta the Younger (1434–1493), Roman Catholic bishop and cardinal
- Giorgio Gorla (born 1944), sailor
- Vittorio Gregotti (1927–2020), architect
- Giovanni Lajolo (born 1935), cardinal
- Isabella Leonarda (1620–1704), composer
- Peter Lombard (1110–1160), theologian
- Enzo Mari (1932–2020), modernist artist
- Teresio Vittorio Martinoli (1917–1944), aviator, flying ace
- Mario Meneghetti (1893–1942), footballer
- Paolo Monti (1908–1982), photographer
- Lorenzo Montipò (born 1996), footballer
- Giacinto Morera (1856–1909), engineer and mathematician
- Ottaviano-Fabrizio Mossotti (1791–1863), physicist
- Cosimo Muci (1920–1992), footballer
- Umberto Orsini (born 1934), actor
- Pacifico da Cerano (1424–1482), theologian
- Roberto Passarin (1934–1982), footballer
- Maria Xaveria Perucona (c. 1652–1709), composer
- Philip of Novara (c. 1200–1270), historian
- Oddone of Novara (c. 1115–1996), Catholic priest
- Silvio Piola (1913–1996), footballer
- Cosimo Pinto (born 1943), boxer
- Francesco Platini (c. 1900–late 20th century), grandfather of Michel Platini
- Pietro Francesco Prina (1647–1727), painter
- Giuseppe Ravizza (1811–1885), inventor
- Ettore Reynaudi (1895–1968), footballer
- Giovanni Battista Ricci (1537–1627), painter
- Giuseppe Saronni (born 1957), racing cyclist
- Oscar Luigi Scalfaro (1918–2012), former President of the Italian Republic
- Carlo Giuseppe Testore (1665–1738), luthier
- Tommaso Tommasina (1855–1935), painter
- Alessio Zerbin (born 1999), footballer
- Antonio Zoppi (1860–1926), painter

== International relations ==
=== Twin towns – sister cities ===
Novara is twinned with:

- Chalon-sur-Saône, France, since 1970
- Koblenz, Germany, since 1991

== See also ==
- Battle of Novara (1513)
- Battle of Novara (1849)
- Battle of Bicocca
- Novara Calcio football club
