= Antonio Zoppi =

Italian painter (1860–1926)

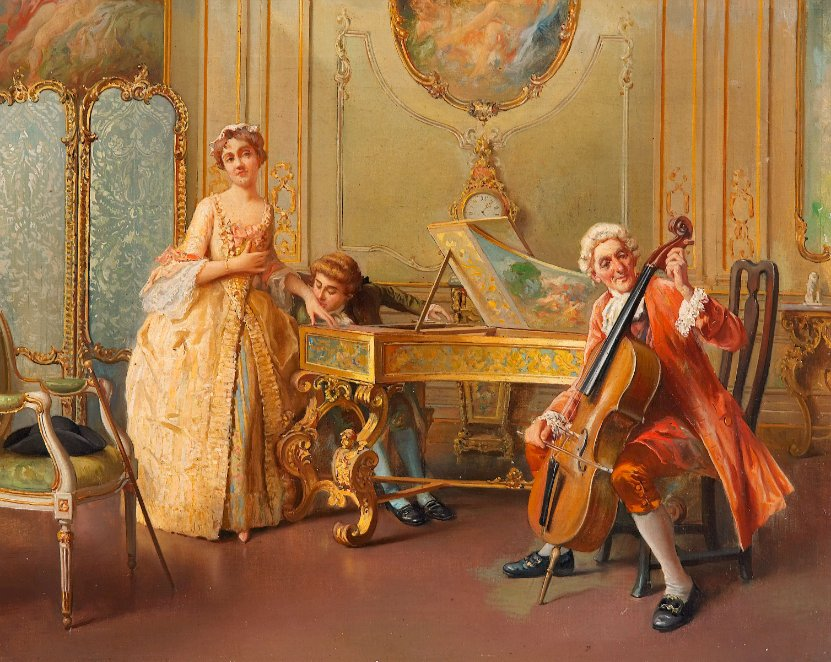
Rococo music scene

Antonio Zoppi (1860–1926) was an Italian painter, mostly of genre and costume scenes, as well as landscapes.

He was born and resident in Novara. In 1881, in Milan, he exhibited: Paggio del secolo XVI. In 1881, in Rome, he exhibited: Fate la carità e In vino laetitia. To other exhibitions he sent: Winter Sun; Dolci ricordi; Il nonno; Adele; Study of a head; A landscaper of Tobacco; and Savoy and Winter Morning. Vendemmia was exhibited at the Brera Academy in 1822. Another painter by the same name was born in Piacenza on 8 April 1826. He was a decorative painter and one who depicted quadratura.

Among his works: a quadratura painting inside the house of Dezzopis; a garden in the house of signor Filippo Guastoni at Piacenza, and another depicting a garden in casa Beltrami, the Sanvitali depicting the sea. He also painted scenography and decorations for the Teatro Municipale.
