= Tommaso Tommasina =

Italian painter and sculptor (1855–1935)

Tommaso Tommasina (Novara, Piedmont, 26 November 1855 - 1935) was an Italian painter and sculptor.

He was resident in Rome and later in Suna on the shores of Lago Maggiore. After 1886, he moved to Geneva. He painted portraits and watercolours. At Turin, in 1880 and 1884, he exhibited a portrait of a woman. He also completed the following watercolours: Quel che avvenne poi and Mater dolorosa, and a bronzed stucco bust, titled: Civis romanus sum!
