= Lumellogno =

Coordinates: 45°25′N 8°35′E

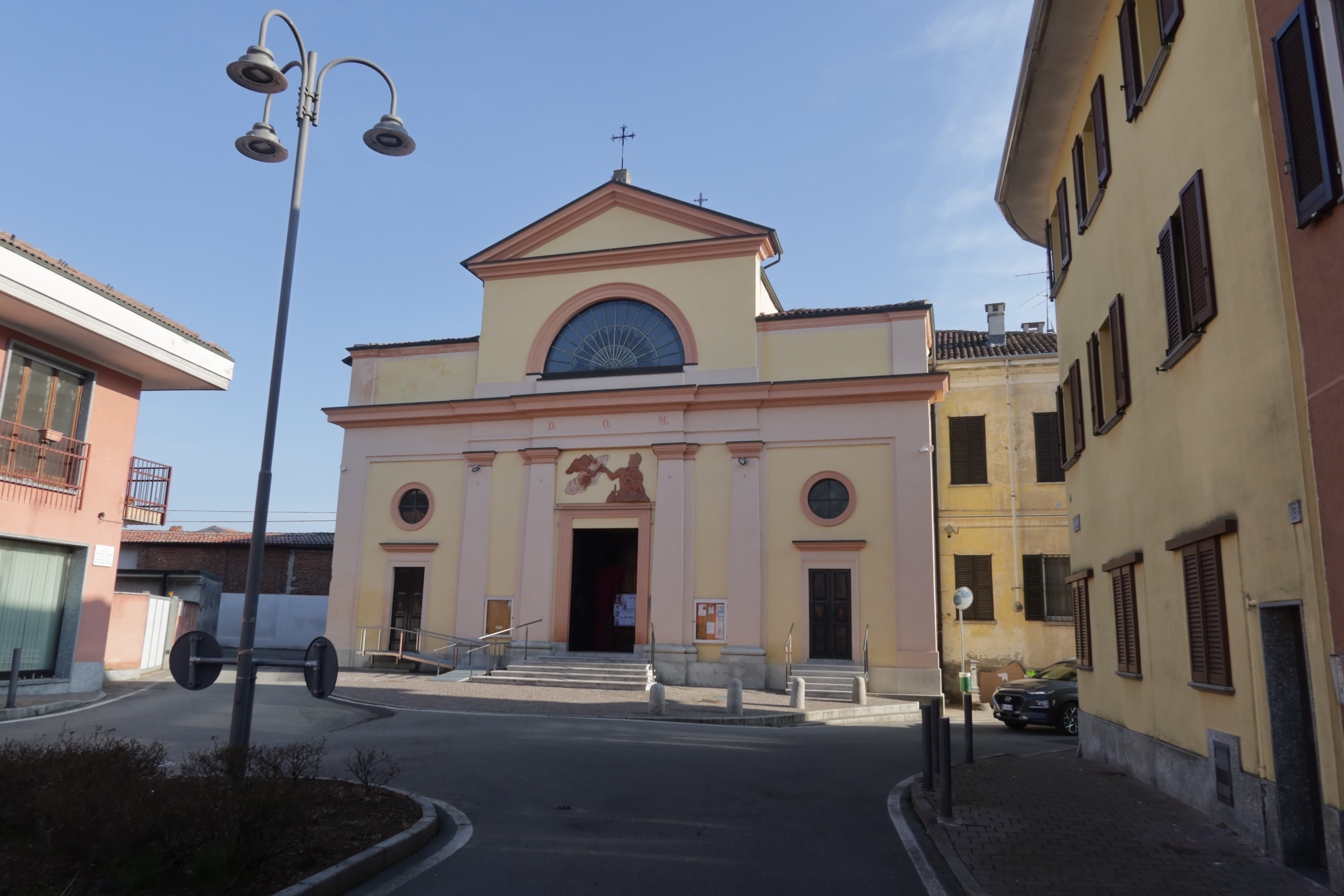

Lumellogno is a settlement of some 1,500 people to the south-west of the city of Novara in the Italian province Piedmont. Administratively it is a quarter (quartiere) of the Commune of Novara; geographically it is separated from the town by paddy fields and the torrent Agogna.

Lumellogno was the birthplace of the noted twelfth-century scholastic Petrus Lombardus.
