= Giovanni Angelo del Maino =

Italian sculptor in wood

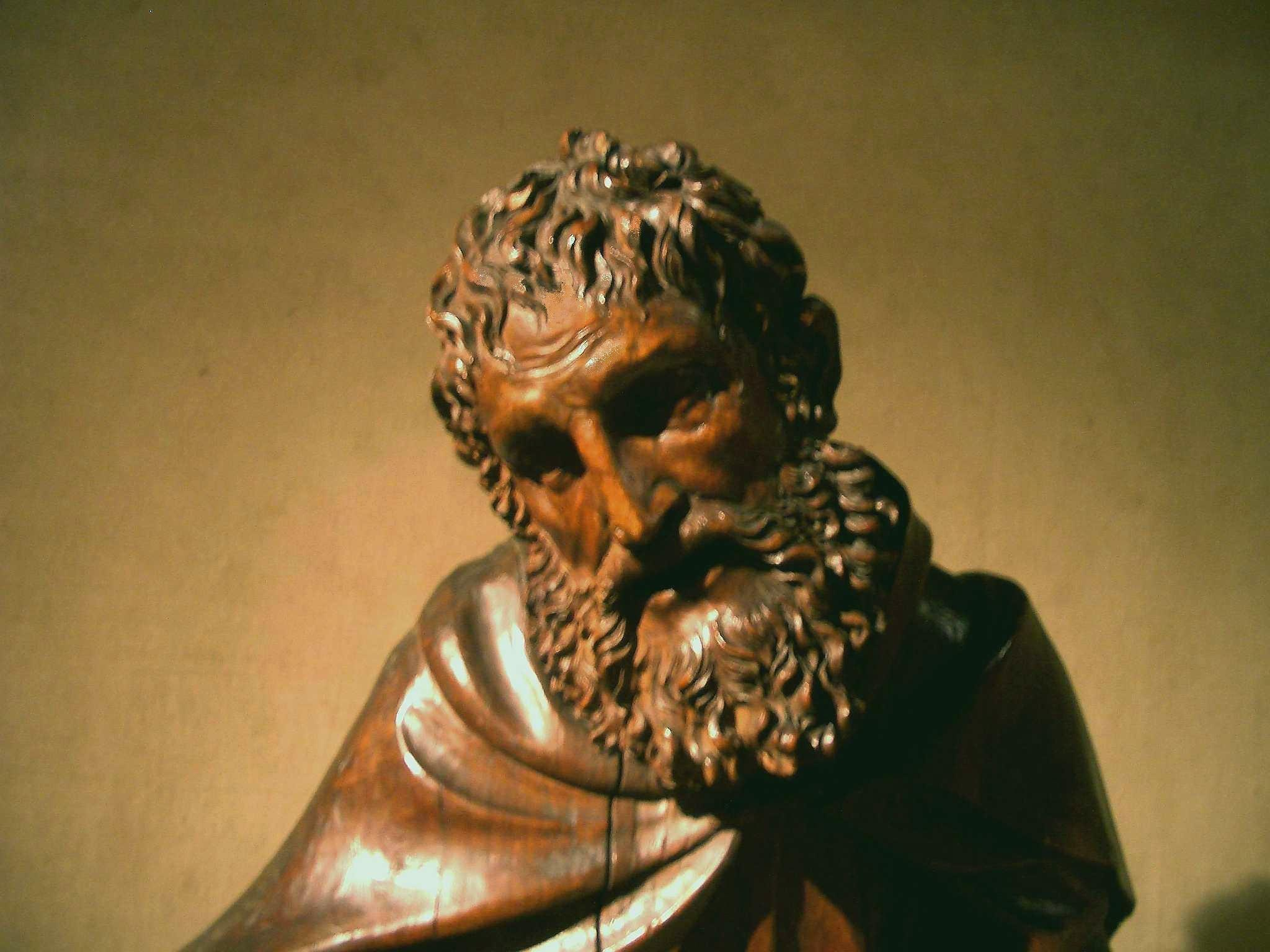
Giovanni Angelo del Maino, Nicodemus (from a broken-up Lamentation), wood, c. 1518, Milan, Castello Sforzesco, Civiche raccolta d’Arte Applicata

Giovanni Angelo del Maino (active in Pavia and the duchy of Milan 1496–1536; possibly born in Milan, c. 1475; date of death unknown) was an Italian sculptor in wood. His works include the Ancona dell'Assunta.

== Life and works ==
He and his brother Tiburzio were sons of Giacomo del Maino, magister a lignamine (master in woodwork), who headed one of the main sacred woodwork workshops in Milan, in which they were trained. Giovanni soon absorbed the many technical skills required to create the vast array of sacred furnishings required of woodcarvers (choir stalls, architectural structures and statues for altarpieces, sculptural groups, carved reliefs, crucifixes, etc.) and inherited from his father a vigorously expressive artistic language, somewhat harsh and cutting, not without Northern European influences. Giacomo decided to move his workshop to Pavia, perhaps attracted by the important commissions for the decorations of the Certosa thanks to his contacts with Amadeo.

In 1496 Tiburzio and Giovanni were both registered for the first time in Pavia as master woodworkers. At that date Giacomo continued to manage the workshop: the first works in which Giovan Angelo's greater artistic talent can be observed are the result of a close collaboration with his father, as for example in the imposing Santo Stefano Altarpiece in the Basilica of San Michele Maggiore in Pavia and in the Crucifix in the Collegiate Church of San Giovanni Battista in Castel San Giovanni.

Soon, however, the young Giovanni began to seek independence and found himself measuring himself against the appreciated innovations of Lombard classicism, especially the sculptures of Briosco and Bambaja. Evidence of a now-renewed style, softer and more attentive to detail – almost as if he wished to compete with works in marble – can be found in the relief of the Lamentation over the Dead Christ (1500–1505) now in Berlin; then in the Nativity in the collegiate church of San Martino and Santa Maria Assunta in Treviglio, from about the same time as the fragmentary Crucifixion in the parish church of Albate, and in Como Cathedral from the exuberant decorative apparatus of the 1514 Sant'Abbondio Altarpiece and of the 1515 Crucifix Altarpiece. The adoption of sumptuous grotesque decorations in the 1515 work fits tastes in Rome at the time and leads some to suggest Giovanni went there; no surviving documents support this and grotesques already featured in many paintings of the time, such as ones by Stefano Scotto and Gaudenzio Ferrari.

The altarpiece at Como Cathedral must have brought great prestige and fame to Giovanni's workshop; his brother Tiburzio also worked there. Many works are the result of collaboration between the two brothers, with their hands distinguishable from each other. For example, a Lamentation was created by their workshop around 1510 and is located in the church of Santa Marta in Bellano (a work in which Tiburzio's influence, less up-to-date with the Lombard classicist style, seems to prevail). The brothers' workshop became the main point of reference for wooden sculpture throughout the Duchy of Milan.

The most important works from Giovanni's later phase include:

- The Assumption Altarpiece (1516–1519), gilded and painted by Gaudenzio Ferrari and Fermo Stella
- Betrothal of the Virgin, relief, possibly originally part of the altarpiece for the Santuario della Madonna di Tirano in Tirano (Museo Poldi Pezzoli, Milan)
- Crucifixion, altarpiece, atop a carved predella with scenes of the Nativity from Piacenza, now in the Victoria and Albert Museum, London
- Altarpiece for the church of San Lorenzo in Ardenno (1540)

His major works also include the life-size 1532–1536 Lamentation in the church of San Paolo in Gambolò, whose six figures have faces with Leonardesque attention to emotion and very finely rendered and brightly coloured draperies. Lamentation groups were particularly popular in Lombardy and many were commissioned from the Del Maino family; individual figures from broken-up Lamentations by Giovanni are now in the church of San Martino in Cuzzago and in the Civiche raccolta d'arte applicate of the Castello Sforzesco in Milan.

== Bibliography (in Italian) ==
- Richard V. Schofield, Janice Shell, Grazioso Sironi, Giovanni Antonio Amadeo/ I documenti, Edizioni New Press, Como 1989.
- Paolo Venturoli, Del Maino (ad vocem), Dizionario Biografico degli Italiani, XXXVIII, Roma 1990, pp. 103–111.
- Angela Guglielmetti, Scultura lignea nella diocesi di Novara tra '400 e '500. Proposta per un catalogo, Novara 2000.
- Marco Albertario, «Clari et celebres habiti sunt, ut antiqui superasse credantur: Giacomo, Giovanni Angelo e Tiburtio Del Maino attraverso i documenti pavesi (+496-1536)», in «Bollettino della Società pavese di storia patria», LII, Pavia 2000, pp. 105–173.
- Raffaele Casciaro, La scultura lignea lombarda del Rinascimento, Skira, Milano 2000.
- Dario Gnemmi, Recensione a Angela Guglielmetti, Scultura lignea nella diocesi di Novara tra '400 e '500. Proposta per un catalogo, in «Bollettino storico per la provincia di Novara», LXXXXIII, Novara 2002.
- Raffaele Casciaro, Dispersione e recupero. Appunti per la storia delle ancone lignee lombarde, in Scultori e intagliatori del legno in Lombardia nel Rinascimento, Electa, Milano 2002.
- Alberto Bertoni, Raffaella Ganna, La presenza di Giovanni Angelo Del Maino a Varese e alcune puntualizzazioni su Andrea da Saronno e la sua cerchia, in «Scultori e intagliatori del legno in Lombardia nel Rinascimento», Milano 2002.
- Gianni Romano, Desiderata per la scultura lignea, in Marco Bascapè, Francesca Tasso (a cura di), Atti della giornata di studio, Milano Castello Sforzesco 17 marzo 2005, Cinisello Balsamo 2005.
- Marco Albertario, Intorno a Giovanni Angelo Del Maino, in Gianni Romano, Claudio Salsi (a cura di), «Maestri della scultura in legno nel ducato degli Sforza», catalogo della omonima mostra, Silvana Editoriale, Cinisello Balsamo 2005.
- Raffaele Casciaro, Maestri e botteghe del secondo Quattrocento, in Giovanni Romano e Claudio Salsi (a cura di), Maestri della Scultura in Legno nel ducato degli Sforza, Silvana Editoriale, 2005.
- Marco Albertario, Giovanni Angelo del Maino e Gaudenzio Ferrari, alle soglie della maniera moderna, in «Sacri Monti. Rivista di arte, conservazione, paesaggio e spiritualità dei Sacri Monti piemontesi e lombardi», I, 2007, pp. 339–364.
- Marco Albertario, Spunti per la lettura dell'ancona, in «Tota enitet auro». L'ancona dell'Assunta nel santuario di Morbegno, Morbegno 2007, 65–85.
- Marco Albertario, Una scheda su Giovanni Angelo Del Maino. (Tra il 1500 e il 1515), in «Rassegna di Studi e di Notizie», XXXI, 2007–2008, pp. 13–36.
- Marco Albertario, Giulio Perotti, Ritrovata un'opera di Giovanni Angelo Del Maino. La Madonna del «Compianto» di Morbegno, in «Le Vie del Bene», 10, 2007, pp. 9–15.
- Marco Albertario, Giulio Perotti, Giovanni Angelo Del Maino. 1517–1518: La Madonna del Compianto di Morbegno, in «Rassegna di Studi e Notizie», XXXIII, 2010, pp. 127–179.
- Giovanni Agosti, Jacopo Stoppa, Giovanni Angelo Del Maino. Madonna svenuta, in Giovanni Agosti, Jacopo Stoppa, Marco Tanzi (a cura di), Il Rinascimento nelle terre ticinesi. Da Bramantino a Bernardino Luini. Officina Libraria, Milano 2010.
- Marco Albertario, L'effigie alterata. Sul San Giovanni evangelista di Giovanni Angelo del Maino, Munich 2017.
