= Giovanni Pietro and Giovanni Ambrogio de Donati =

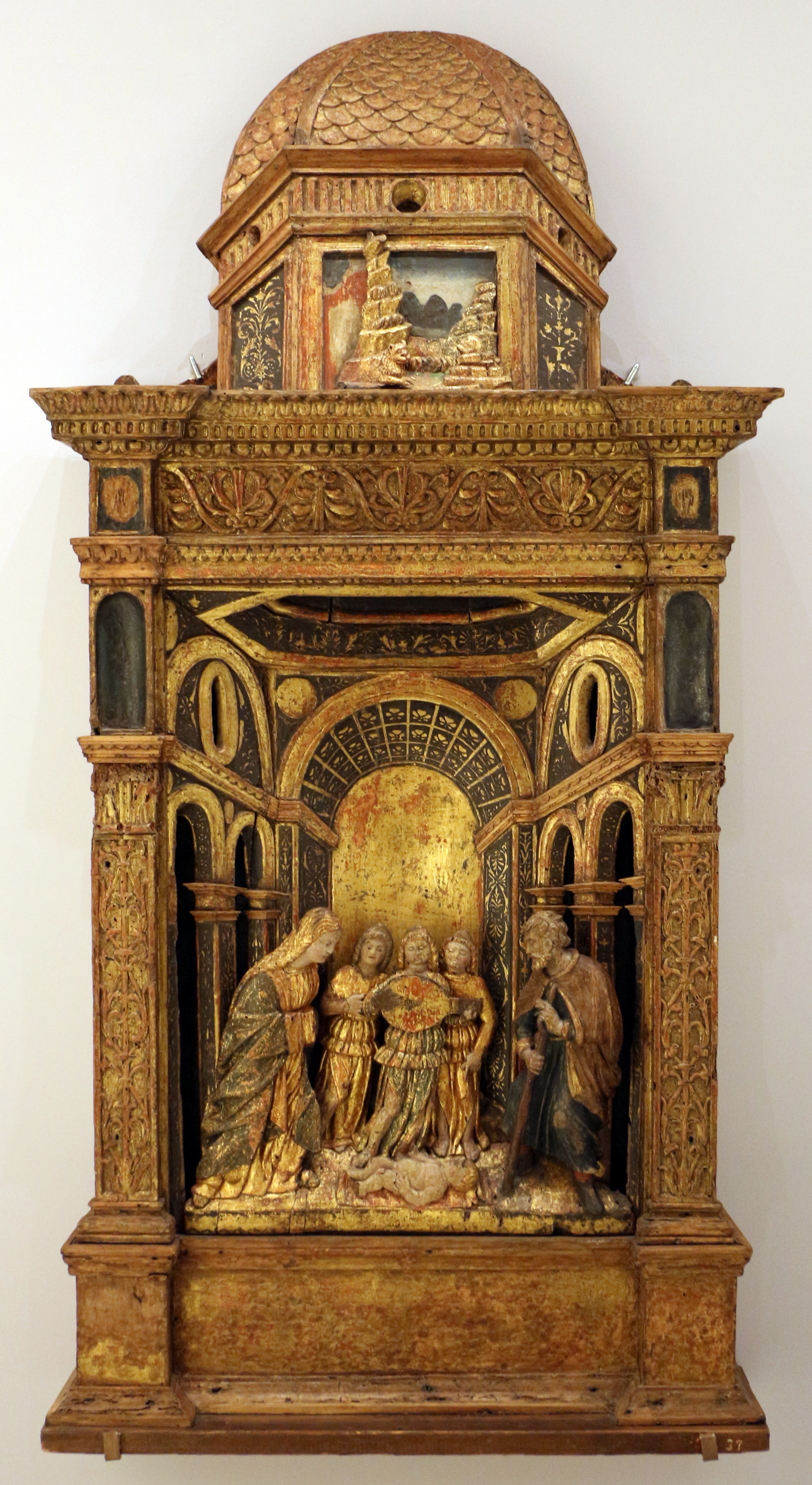
Adoration of the Christ Child by the brothers' workshop, c. 1500–1510, Castello Sforzesco, Milan

Giovanni Pietro and Giovanni Ambrogio de Donati were two brothers and woodcarvers, among the main artists in that medium in the Duchy of Milan in the 15th and 16th centuries. They are recorded between 1484 and 1524.

== Life ==
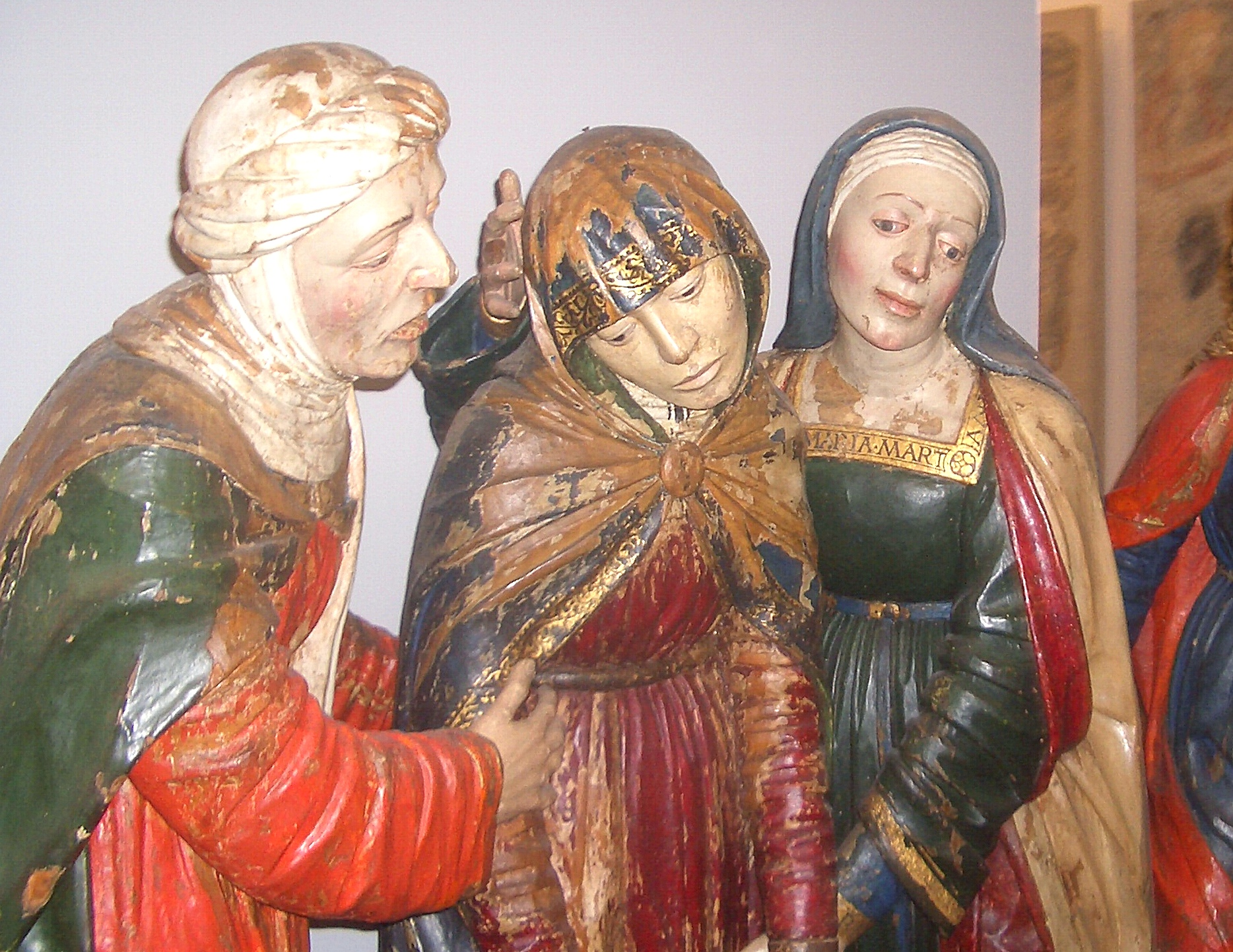
Lamentation over the Dead Christ, Pinacoteca Civica, Varallo Sesia.

The brothers and a third painter brother, Lodovico (Note: Lodovico produced the 1513 Madonna and Child with Saint Bernard and Saint Defendens (Museo Valtellinese di Storia e Arte, Sondrio).), set up an important workshop in Milan, which was very active in the late 15th and early 16th centuries, the "golden age" of woodcarving in Lombardy. Another brother, Alvise, had a workshop in Vercelli and later Milan. He was active until at least 1503, but there is no definitive information on his collaborating with Giovanni Pietro and Giovanni Ambrogio.

Giovanni Pietro and Giovanni Ambrogio produced a wide variety of works – choir stalls, altarpiece frames, polyptychs, sculptural groups of the Lamentation, crucifixes, statues of the Madonna and other altarpieces. Their only main competitor for such works was the major workshop of del Maino. Their artistic language demonstrated their commitment to Renaissance developments by Lombard painters such as Vincenzo Foppa, Bergognone and Bernardino Zenale and (as was usual for the time) drew important inspiration from the repertoire of Northern European engravings available at the time. In the absence of documentary sources, the works from their workshop are attributed to both brothers, given the great difficulty in distinguishing between their styles. In the past, critics had attributed the two large reliefs from the altar of the Basilica of Santa Maria del Monte above Varese, now on display at the Castello Sforzesco in Milan, to Giovanni Pietro; more recently, these works have been attributed to a different, refined Lombard carver whose identity remains unclear, the Master of Trognano.

In creating large altarpieces they also showed familiarity with the architectural solutions adopted by Bramante (such as the perspectivally shortened barrel vault in the arcosolium of the Altar of the Pietà in the Sanctuary of the Madonna del Sasso (Orselina)) and with the decorative elements typical of Giovanni Antonio Amadeo, used to embellish pilasters, pilaster strips, tympanums, and other architectural features.

== Works ==
They produced a Lamentation over the Dead Christ in around 1486–1493 for the Sacro Monte (probably specifically for its Deposition Chapel, giving the sculpture its traditional name of the pietra dell'unzione (Note: After the Stone of Unction in the Church of the Holy Sepulchre in Jerusalem.)) and now in the Pinacoteca civica di Varallo. It harks back to the naturalism and human poetics of Martino Spanzotti, capable of speaking to the hearts of humble people:

Nothing in this Lamentation, observes Giovanni Testori, recalls formal torture, the impulse of an intelligence that dissects situations, exacerbates them, and, in doing so, self-dramatizes. Here, the torment is silent; and the awareness of death is mute. The bodies are mountainous burdens, far from any beauty, yet close to any recognizable emotional bond; one might say, to any kinship; a total, moving human fullness creates and overwhelms them.

Almost contemporary with the Varallo group is the Pietà Altarpiece in Orselina. Its Bramantesque arcosolium houses the scene. The brothers also created the Pietà sculptures (arranged according to an original iconography, with the dead Christ supported by the grieving Madonna and John the Apostle, consoled by a group of angels). The painter of the backdrop with figures of Mary Magdalene, Joseph of Arimathea and Nicodemus is unknown. The artists seem to have been inspired by a print by Mantegna of the Deposition which was very popular in Lombardy and the Veneto.

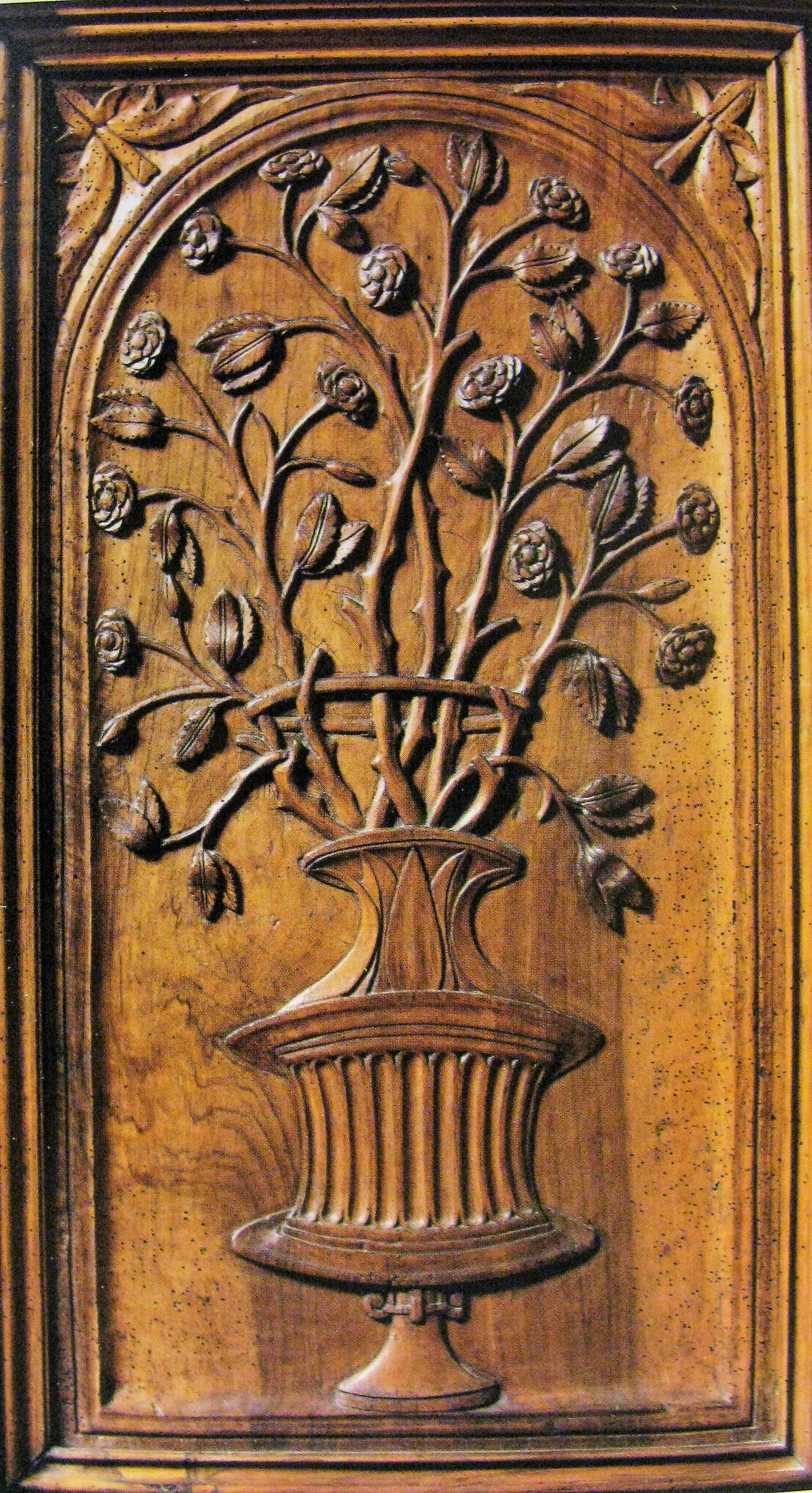
Vase with Roses, 1484, choir stalls of San Francesco in Pavia

In 1497 the brothers were commissioned to produce an altarpiece for the church of San Giovanni Maggiore in Como showing scenes from the life of Saint Peter Martyr, one of their workshop's most important works; in the 19th century it was divided up and sold by an art dealer. Four small panels survive showing scenes from the saint's life, now in four separate museums (the Staatliche Museen in Berlin, the John and Mable Ringling Museum of Art in Sarasota, Florida, the Isabella Stewart Gardner Museum in Boston, and two in the Silesian Museum in Opava, Czech Republic).

Another magnificent Lamentation by Giovanni Pietro and Ambrogio (though it has been heavily repainted) is in the church of San Bartolomeo in Caspano (1500–1510), a town in Civo (SO). The church also houses two more of the brothers' works, both carved, gilded and painted wooden altarpieces, one of the Resurrection of Lazarus (1508) and the other on Saint Bartholomew's altar showing scenes from that saint's life (1510–1520). Other works attributed to the de Donati brothers are primarily reliefs, statuettes and other surviving parts of lost or dismembered altarpieces, such as the wooden altarpiece of 1507 in the Collegiate Church of San Lorenzo in Lugano..

The attribution of works to the brothers faces numerous and complex problems. Only recently has the Master of Trognano (assumed to be one of the two brothers) acquired his own independent artistic profile. Many minor works previously attributed to the brothers' workshop, such as the small altarpieces showing the Nativity, should perhaps be ascribed to that of Giacomo del Maino. On the other hand, in those years it was quite common for the most important commissions to involve collaboration between a number of workshops, a practice that led to some overlap in stylistic language.

=== Other works ===
- Lodi
  - Reliefs with scenes from the Life of the Virgin and niches with statuettes of the Sibyls, both from a dismembered altarpiece, gilded and painted wood, 1495–1498, Museo Civico
- Mazzo di Valtellina
  - Small altarpiece with scenes of the Nativity, gilded and painted wood, 1490–1495, church of Santa Maria
- Milan, Castello Sforzesco, Civiche Raccolte d'Arte Applicata
  - Miracle of Saint Dominic, wooden relief
  - Gilded wooden cornice, 234 x 175 x 31 cm
  - Adoration of the Shepherds, wooden relief, end of the 15th century
  - Small altarpiece with scenes of the Adoration of the Christ Child, carved, painted and gilded wood, c. 1495
- Pavia
  - Sanctuary stalls, carved wood, 1484, church of San Francesco
- Sondrio
  - Statuettes of Saint Lawrence and Saint Roch, gilded and painted poplar wood, 1500–10, Museo valtellinese di storia e arte
- Vigevano
  - Fragments of the Immaculate Altarpiece, carved, gilded and painted wood, Ospedale Civile

== Bibliography (in Italian) ==
- Sergio Gatti, Una sconosciuta opera di Gian Pietro e Ambrogio Donati. L'ancona lignea già in San Lorenzo a Lugano, in «Archivio Storico Ticinese», 71, Casagrande, Bellinzona, 1977, 153–168.
- Raffaele Casciaro, Franco Moro, Proposte e aggiunte per Giovan Pietro, Giovanni Ambrogio e Ludovico De Donati, in «Rassegna di Studi e Notizie», XX, 1996, 37–125.
- Raffaele Casciaro, Maestri e botteghe del secondo Quattrocento, in Giovanni Romano and Claudio Salsi (ed.s), Maestri della Scultura in Legno nel ducato degli Sforza, Silvana Editoriale, 2005.
- Lara Calderari, Da e verso il Canton Ticino. Scambi artistici tra Quattro e Cinquecento, in «Arte+Architettura in Svizzera», LVIII, 2007, 54–55.
- Carlo Cairati, Daniele Cassinelli, Regesto dei documenti, in «Rassegna di Studi e di Notizie», XXXII, 2009, 133–158.
- Giovanni Agosti e Jacopo Stoppa, Ludovico De Donati. Madonna con il Bambino tra San Bernardo da Chiaravalle e San Defendente (?), in Il Rinascimento nelle terre ticinesi. Da Bramantino a Bernardino Luini, exhibition catalogue (Rancate, Pinacoteca cantonale Giovanni Züst, 10 October 2010 – 9 January 2011), edited by Giovanni Agosti, Jacopo Stoppa and Marco Tanzi, Officina Libraria, Milano 2010.
- Marco Tanzi, Giovanni Pietro De Donati, Giovanni Ambrogio De Donati e Giovanni Antonio Da Montonate. Ancona della Pietà, in Il Rinascimento nelle terre ticinesi. Da Bramantino a Bernardino Luini, exhibition catalogue (Rancate, Pinacoteca cantonale Giovanni Züst, 10 October 2010 – 9 January 2011), edited by Giovanni Agosti, Jacopo Stoppa and Marco Tanzi, Officina Libraria, Milano 2010, pp. 122–127.

== External links (in Italian) ==
- "Compianto sul Cristo morto (detta Pietra dell'unzione), Pinacoteca civica di Varallo". Archived from the original on 13 April 2013.
- "Altare di San Bartolomeo, Caspano di Civo, chiesa di San Bartolomeo". Archived from the original on 27 September 2007.
- "Altare della Resurrezione di Lazzaro, Caspano di Civo, chiesa di San Bartolomeo". Archived from the original on 27 September 2007.
- "Compianto sul Cristo morto, Caspano di Civo, chiesa di San Bartolomeo". Archived from the original on 27 September 2007.
