= Gaudenzio Ferrari =

Italian painter and sculptor (c. 1471–1546)

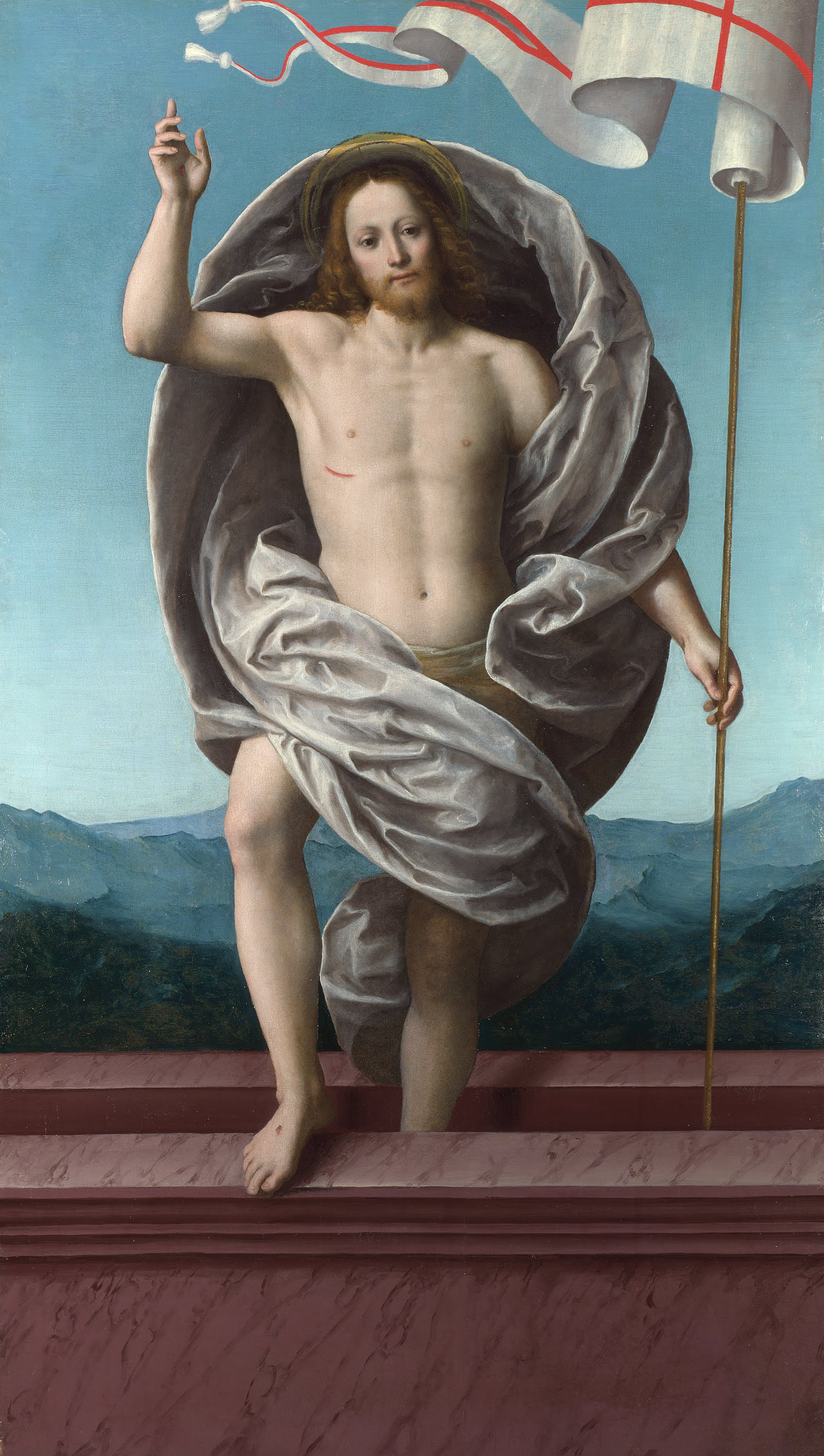
- Christ rising from the Tomb, London, National Gallery
- Born: c. 1471; Valduggia, Valsesia, Duchy of Milan
- Died: January 11, 1546 (aged 74–75); Milan, Duchy of Milan
- Education: Giovanni Stefano Scotti
- Movement: Italian Renaissance

Gaudenzio Ferrari (c. 1471 – 11 January 1546) was an Italian painter and sculptor of the Renaissance.

== Biography ==
=== Early life and education ===
Gaudenzio was born to Franchino Ferrari at Valduggia in Valsesia in the Duchy of Milan. Valduggia is now in the province of Vercelli in Piedmont. He is said to have first learned the art of painting at Vercelli from Gerolamo Giovenone. He probably received his training at Varallo at the beginning of the 1490s, a lively period in the town’s artistic life, when extensive works were being carried out at the Sacro Monte. His master was Giovanni Stefano Scotti, none of whose works has as yet been identified but who, judging from the early work of his pupil, may have been influenced by Lombard artists, most notably Bernardino Luini.

Gaudenzio’s early works, such as a painting on panel of the Crucifixion (Varallo, Museo Civico Pietro Calderini), were influenced by the poetic art of Bramantino and by the northern Italian classicizing style of the Milanese painter Bernardo Zenale. His early, but self-assured, Angel of the Annunciation (c. 1500; Vercelli, Museo Civico Borgogna), painted for the convent of the Grazie, Vercelli, suggests that these sources were soon enriched by his response to the tender Renaissance style of Pietro Perugino (active at the Certosa di Pavia, 1496–9).

Gaudenzio is also recorded at Vercelli in the first known documentary reference to him, the contract for a polyptych commissioned by the Confraternity of St. Anna in 1508, with Eusebio Ferrari acting as guarantor. There remain four paintings of scenes from the Life of St. Anne and God the Father (Turin, Galleria Sabauda) and two of the Annunciation (London, National Gallery). In these works Gaudenzio’s style is more controlled, possibly as a result of a journey to Central Italy in c. 1505. In 1513 Gaudenzio painted a cycle of frescoes showing scenes from the Passion on the dividing wall of Santa Maria delle Grazie, Varallo. Giovanni Martino Spanzotti had painted a similar cycle in Santa Bernardino, Ivrea, a century earlier. The frescoes are rich in strikingly realistic detail and convey emotion with passionate intensity; here Gaudenzio created new forms to express human emotions and attitudes.

Gaudenzio's initial pictorial style may be considered as derived mainly from the old Milanese school, which had imbibed the classic influence of Leonardo and pupils such as Bramantino. However, the provincial impetus was also strong, as is demonstrated in his emotive work at the Sacro Monte di Varallo.

=== Mature work ===
In the second decade of the 16th century Gaudenzio painted a series of great polyptychs in the area around Novara. A polyptych at Arona, Piedmont shows, in the upper register, God Blessing St. Ambrose, St. Felinus, St. Jerome and St. Gratianus and, in the lower, the Nativity with St. Catherine, St. Barbara, St. Gaudentius and St. Peter Martyr, with Christ and the Apostles on the predella (1511; Arona, Santa Maria). An altar (1514–21) in the Basilica of San Gaudenzio, shows a Nativity in the upper register with a divided Annunciation to either side of it and a Virgin and Child with Saints below, flanked by St. Peter, St. John the Baptist, St. Agabus and St. Paul. The predella is devoted to Legends of St. Gaudentius. In the second altar Gaudenzio conveys emotion with ease and grace, predominantly through rich and emotionally expressive colour. In 1514-1516 he contributed to the Ancona dell'Assunta.

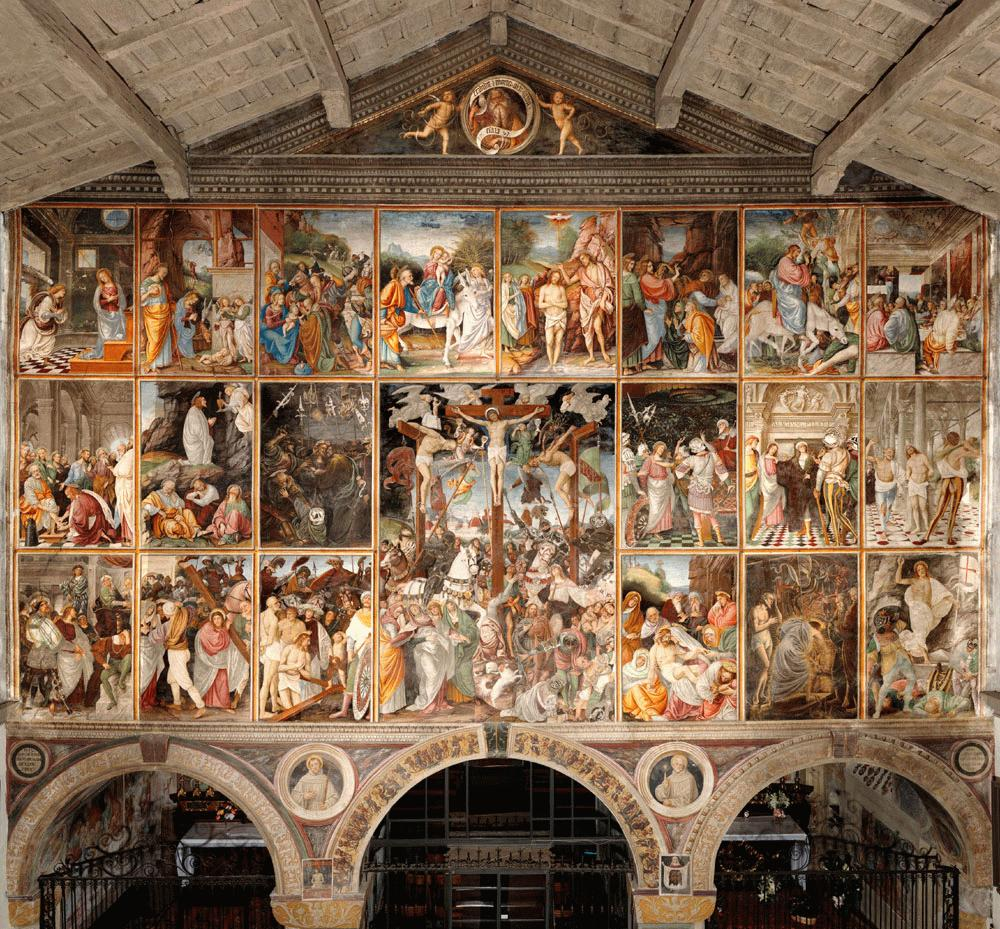
Histories of Christ, 1513, fresco, Santa Maria delle Grazie, Varallo Sesia

It is harder to trace Gaudenzio’s career over the next decade. He returned to work in the chapels of the Sacro Monte di Varallo by 1524. The chapels are dispersed over a hilltop sanctuary, connected by a winding path, and containing a combination of diorama and wax museum with life-size terracotta figures. He executed his most memorable work, a fresco of the Crucifixion (pictured right), with a multitude of figures, no less than twenty-six of them being modelled in actual relief, and coloured. He combined painting with life-size statues of polychrome terracotta and created a radically new rendering of scenes from the Passion. The sculptures, which are startlingly realistic, are arranged as though on a stage and blend with illusionistic and dramatically expressive frescoes.

At the same time Gaudenzio started painting and gilding the great wooden altarpiece created by Giovanni Angelo Del Maino for the sanctuary of the Assumption at Morbegno, with scenes from the Life of the Virgin and Christ. The beautiful polyptych of the Holy Sacrament (Isola Bella, Museo Borromeo) must have been painted by 1531. Gaudenzio’s work was done over a wide geographical area, but it was at Vercelli that he achieved his greatest success. Between 1529 and 1532 he painted an altar, the Virgin of the Oranges, and frescoed scenes from the Life of Mary Magdalene, a Crucifixion and scenes from the Life of the Virgin in the church of San Cristoforo, Vercelli. The powerful Crucifixion, or the harmonious and spirited Assumption of the Virgin, demonstrate Gaudenzio’s high level of achievement in portraying sacred subjects. The psychological power of the protagonists is remarkable, as successful here as in his smaller paintings.

=== Later career ===
At this point Gaudenzio began working more regularly in Lombardy, starting with his ethereal, visionary frescoes of Angel Musicians (1534–6) for the dome of the sanctuary of Santa Maria delle Grazie at Saronno, where he succeeded the recently deceased Bernardino Luini. The contract was drawn up in Milan, where Gaudenzio lived from 1539 until his death and where he opened a workshop that carried out the city’s main private commissions. In the frescoes at Saronno, and in his later work in Milan, Gaudenzio’s art took a new direction; he placed greater emphasis on a more theatrical language of gesture and expression, and he drew closer to the prevailing style of Milanese Mannerism. This emphasis on drama is developed in works such as the Martyrdom of St. Catherine (Milan, Pinacoteca di Brera) and the frescoes for Santa Maria della Pace, now transferred on to canvas, depicting scenes from the Life of St. Anne and scenes from the Life of the Virgin (1545; Milan, Pinacoteca di Brera), which are among the most impressive works of his final years.

Gaudenzio was an influential artist and a series of cartoons (Turin, Accademia) suggests the existence of a school of artists who kept his style alive throughout the rest of the century. Ferrari was a very prolific painter, distinguished by strong animation. In general character, his work suggests more of the 15th than the 16th century. His subjects were always religious. Andrea Solari, Giovan Battista della Cerva, Gian Paolo Lomazzo, and Fermo Stella were his principle students.

== Selected works ==
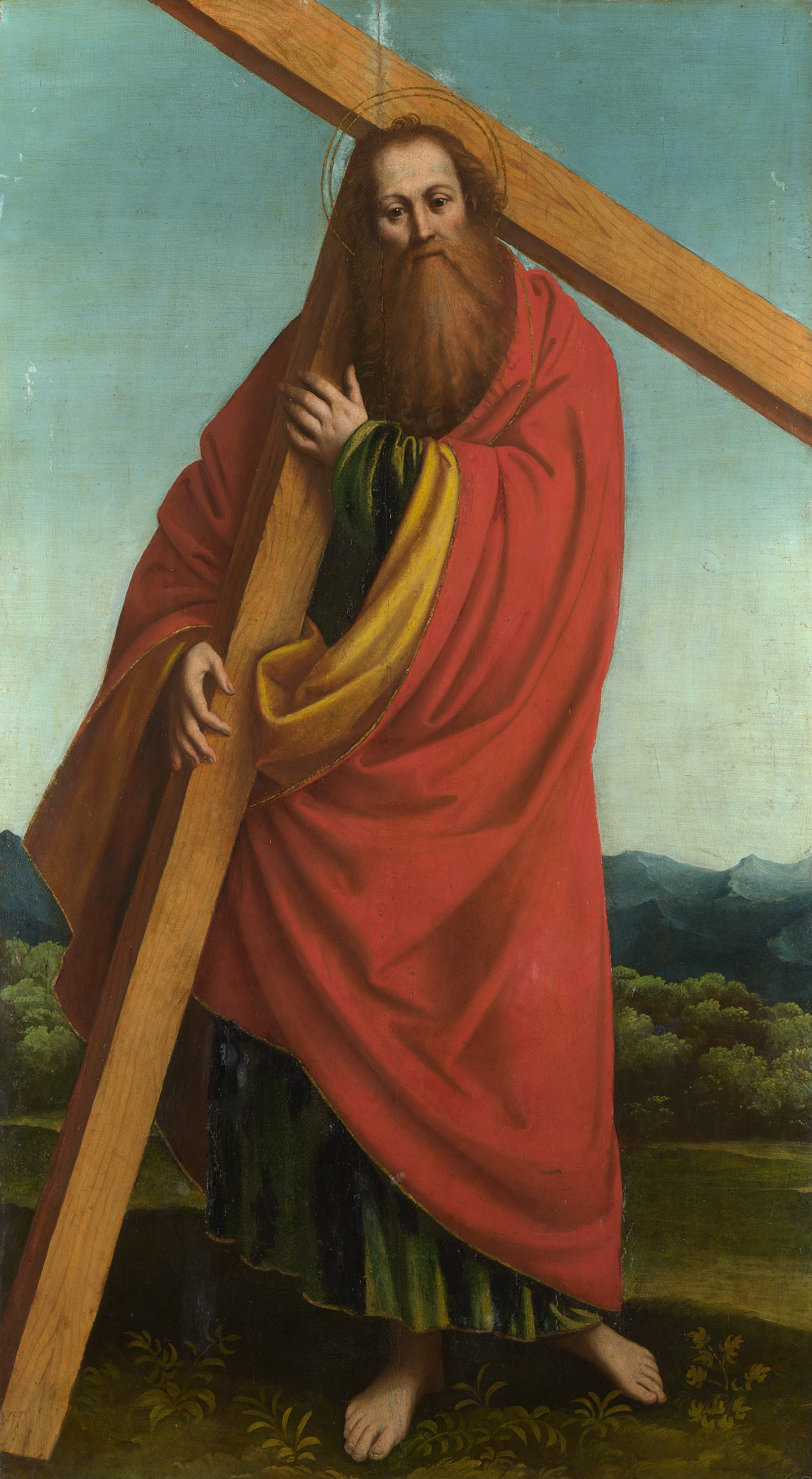
Saint Andrew, London, National Gallery

- Sant'Anna Altarpiece (Galleria Sabauda and National Gallery, London)
- Pietà, in the Galleria Sabauda, Turin
- St Catharine Miraculously Saved from the Torture of the Wheel, Brera Gallery, Milan
- Frescoes in church of Santa Maria della Pace, Milan
- Virgin with Angels and Saints under an Orange Tree, Vercelli Cathedral
- Last Supper, Refectory of San Paolo
- Birth of the Virgin, Annunciation, Visitation, Adoration of the Shepherds and Kings, Crucifixion, Assumption of the Virgin (1532–1535), Church of San Cristoforo
- St. Paul Meditating, Louvre, Paris
- Presentation in the Temple, Christ among the Doctors, History of Christ (1507), Convent of the Minorites, Varallo
- Adoration (after 1527), Santa Maria di Loreto, near Varallo
- Glory of Angels (1535), Dome of the Santa Maria dei Miracoli, Saronno
- Scourging of Christ, Ecce Homo and Crucifixion (1542), Santa Maria delle Grazie, Milan
- Saint Andrew, London, National Gallery
- Christ rising from the Tomb, London, National Gallery
- Lamentation of Christ, c. 1527–1529, Museum of Fine Arts, Budapest
- St. Cecile with the Donator and St. Marguerite, Pushkin Museum, Moscow
- Beheading of a saint, c. 1540, Bonnefantenmuseum, Maastricht
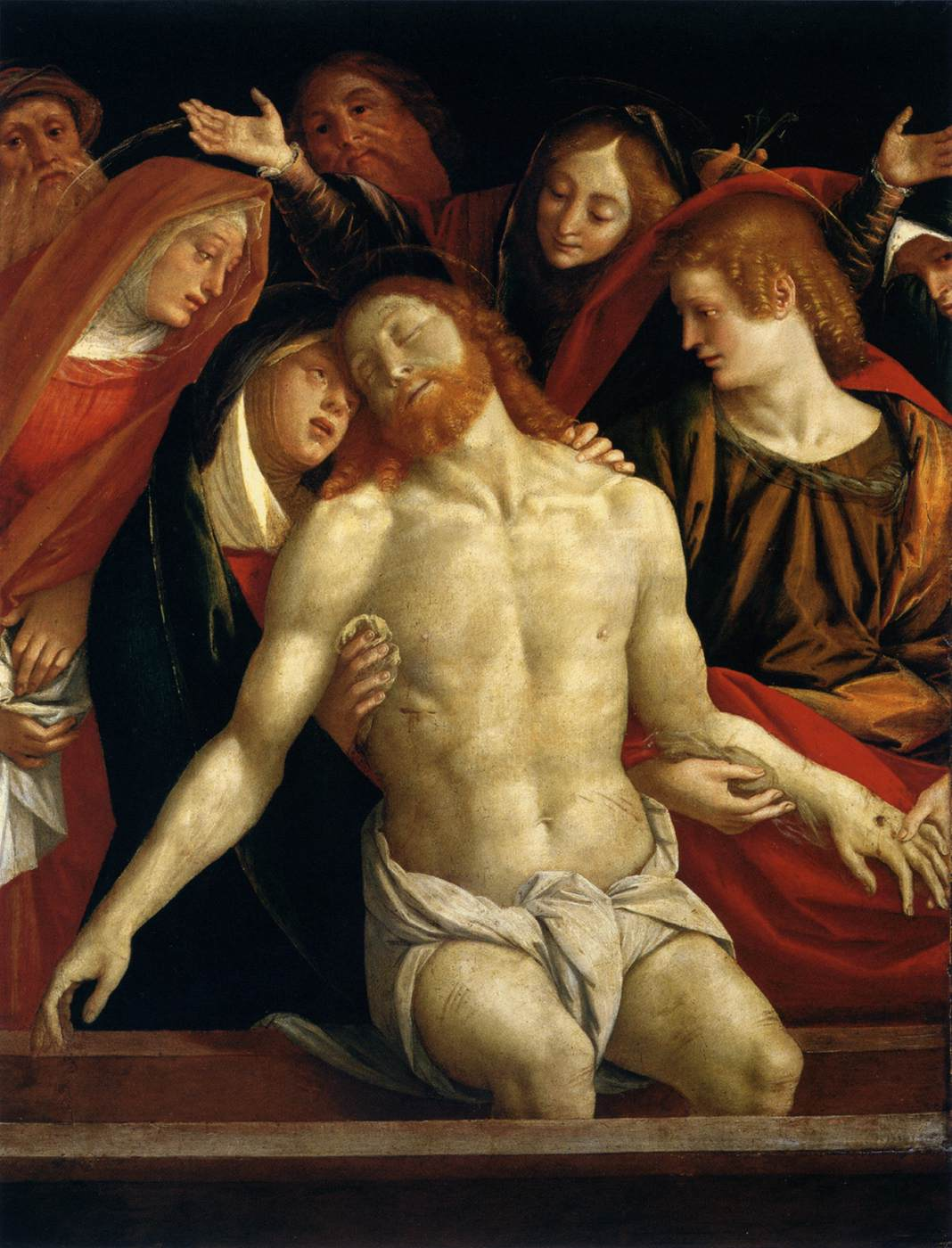
Lamentation of Christ, c. 1527–1529, Museum of Fine Arts, Budapest

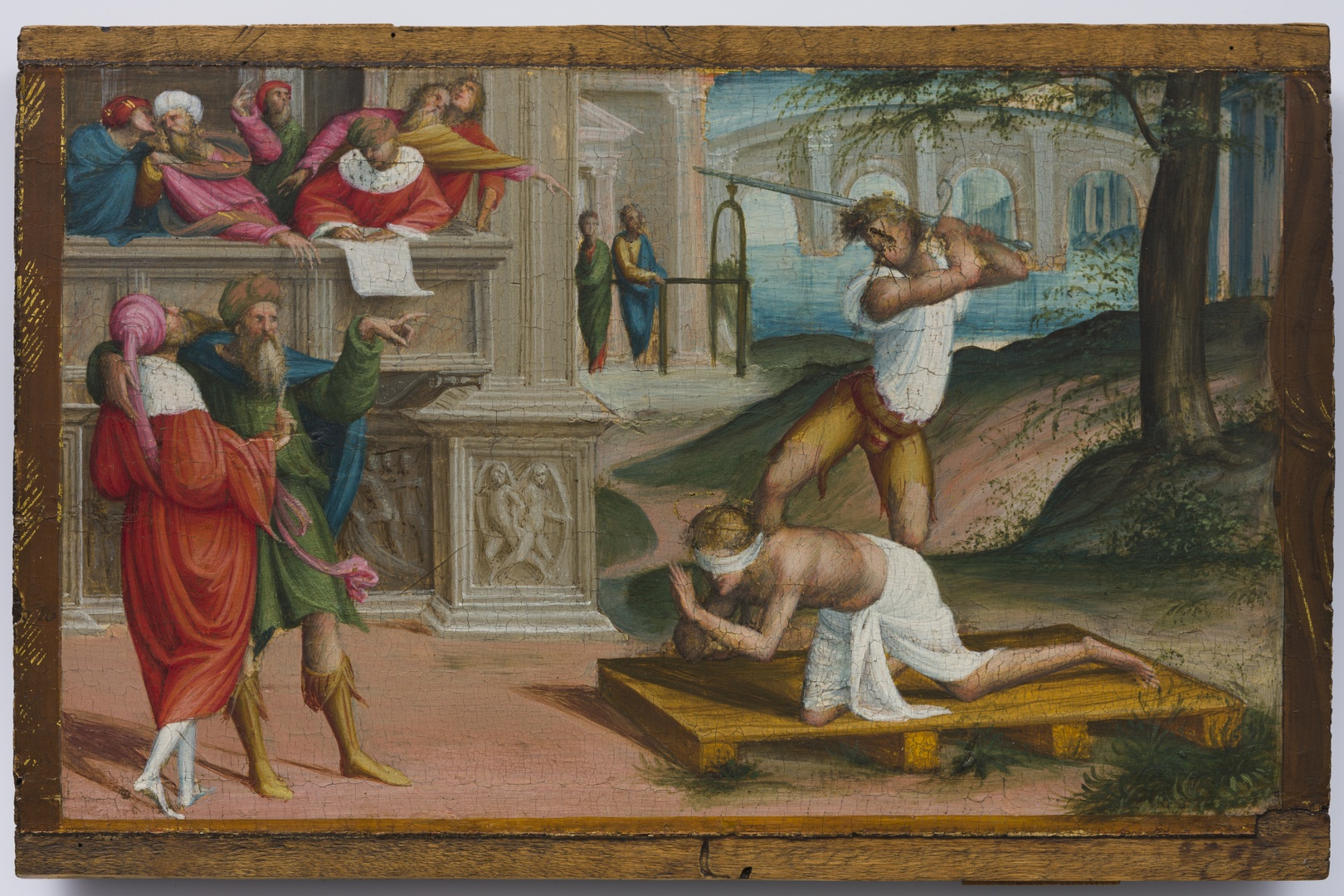
Beheading of a saint, c. 1540, Bonnefantenmuseum, Maastricht

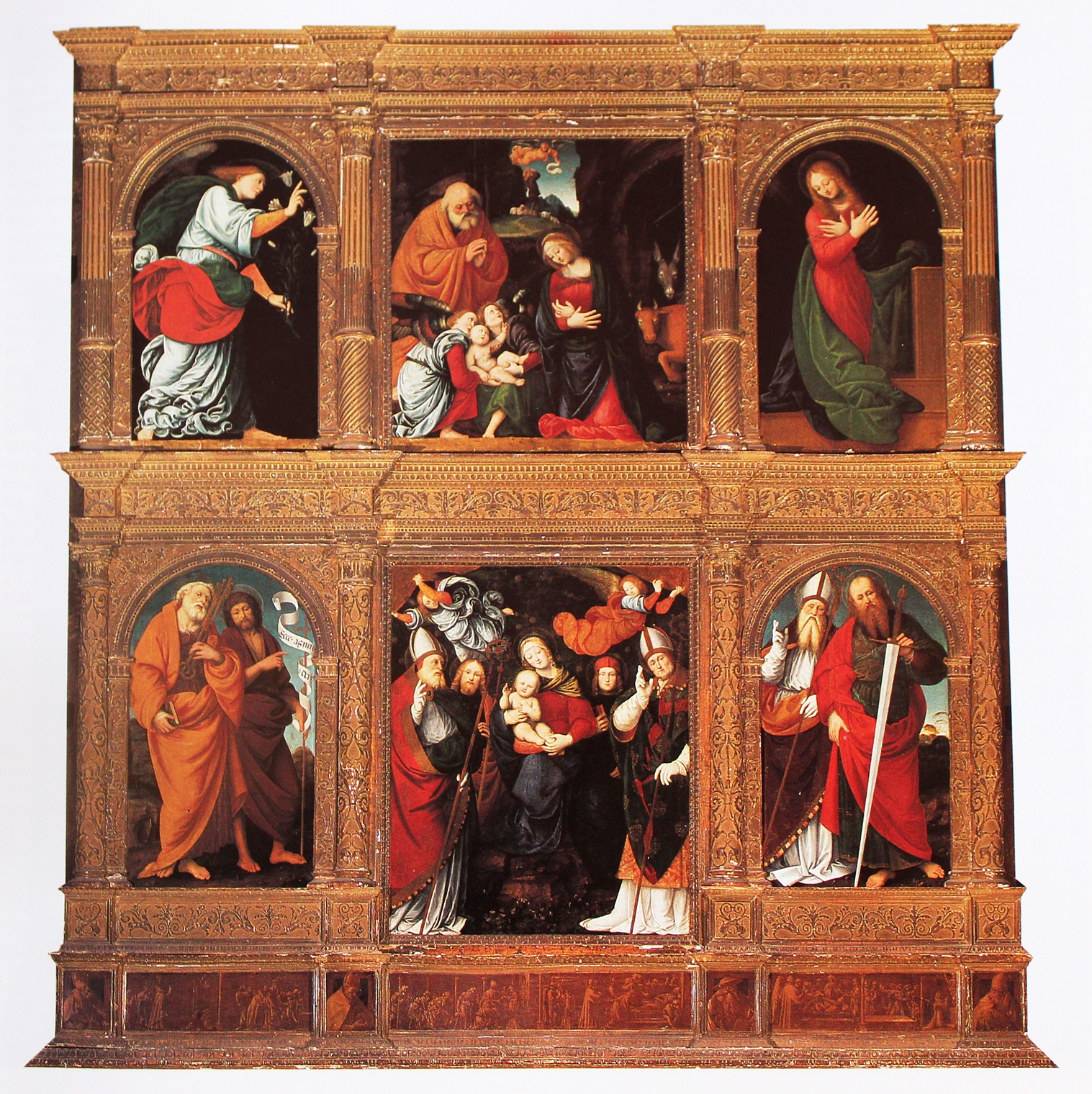
Polyptych of Novara

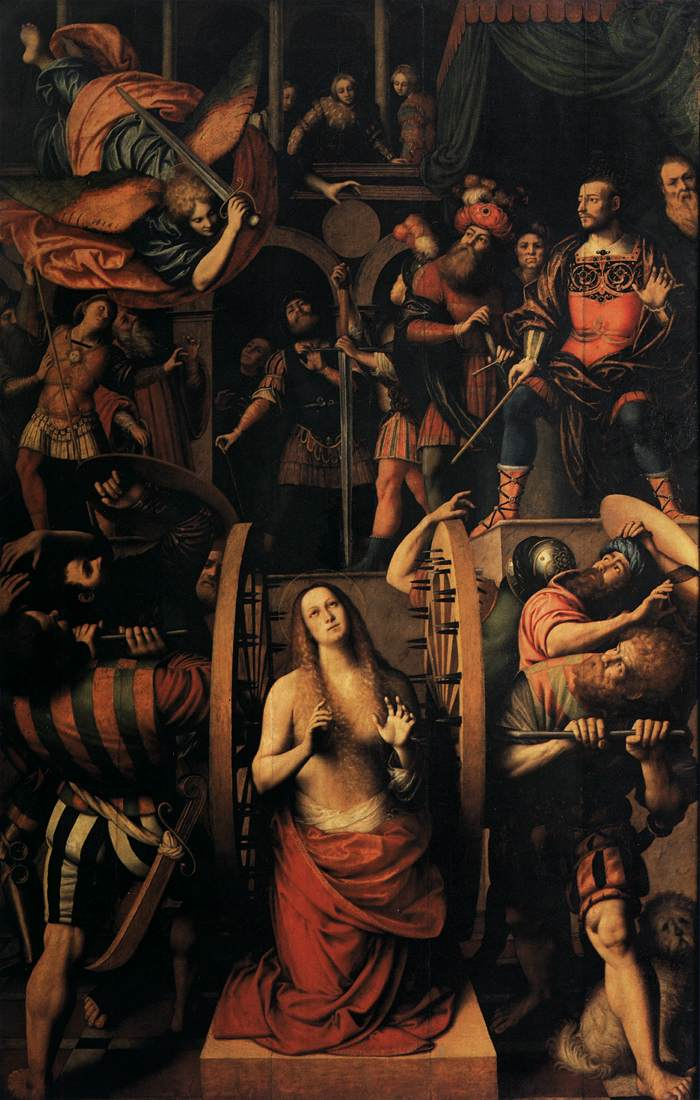
The Martyrdom of St. Catherine of Alexandria, Pinacoteca di Brera, Milan

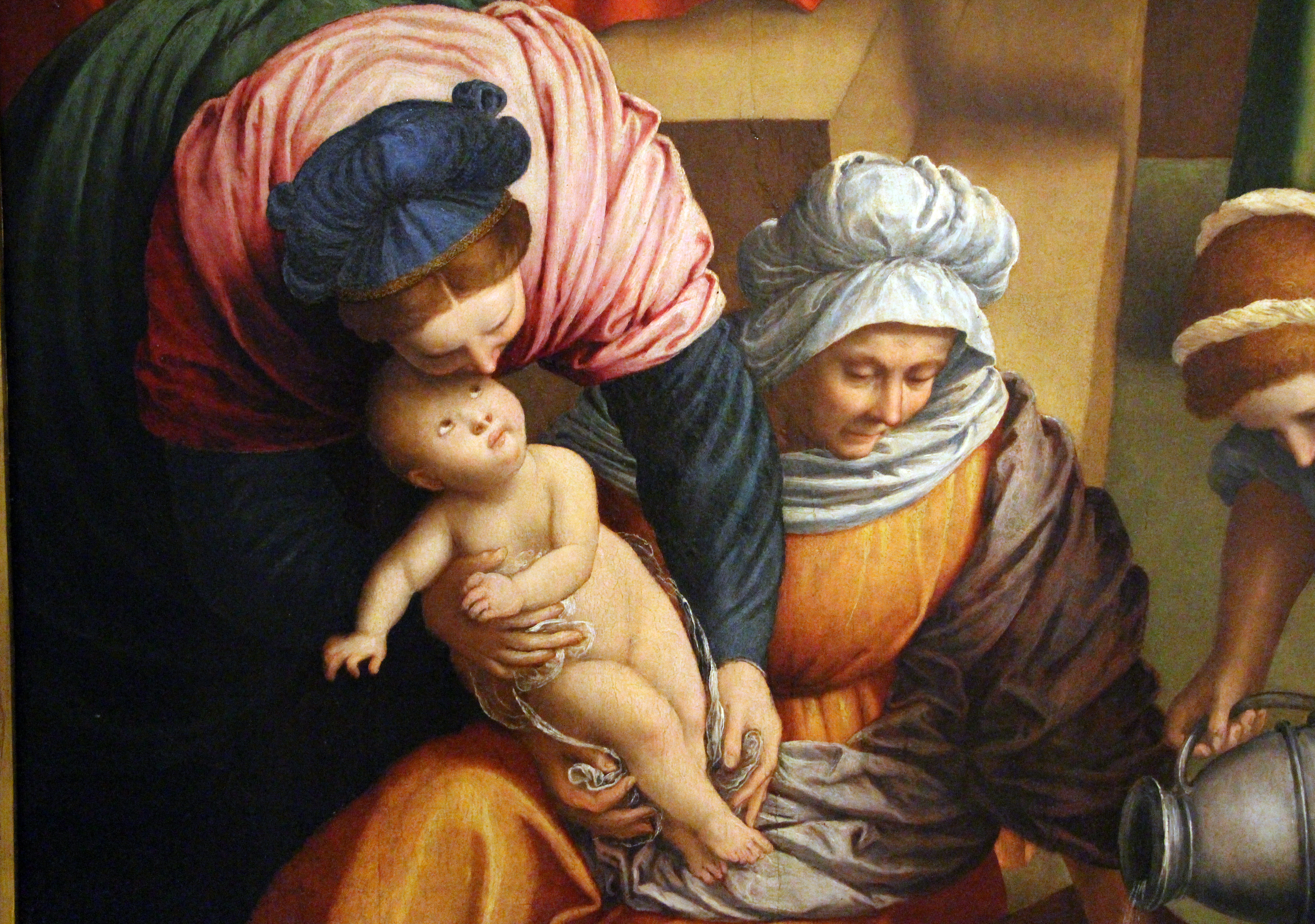
Nativity of the Virgin (Detail), c. 1541–1543, Pinacoteca di Brera, Milan

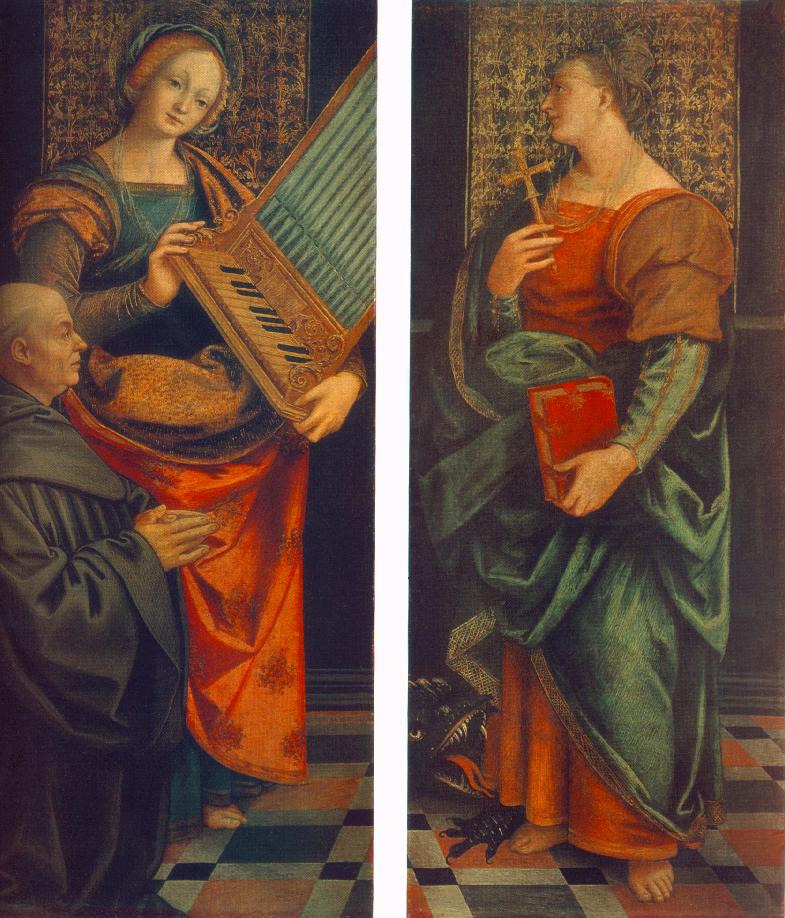
St. Cecile with the Donator and St. Marguerite, Pushkin Museum, Moscow

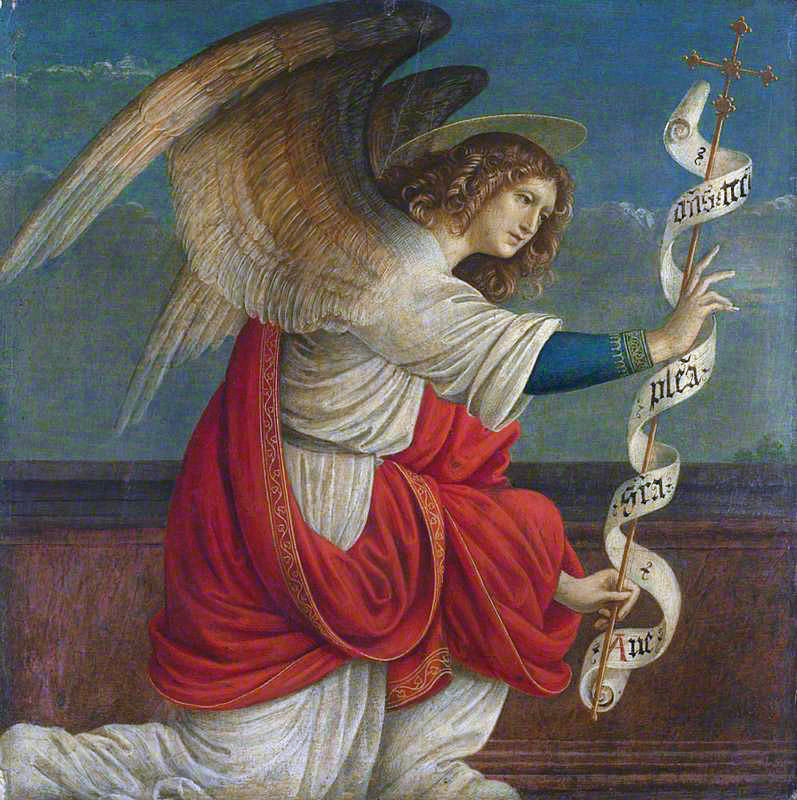
The Annunciation (Detail), London, National Gallery

== Sources ==
- Freedberg, Sydney J. (1993). Painting in Italy, 1500–1600. Pelican History of Art. Penguin Books Ltd. pp. 392–397.
- Carlone, Mariagrazia (1999). "Gaudenzio Ferrari and the Musical Statues in Varallo". Music in Art: International Journal for Music Iconography. 24 (1–2): 89–100. ISSN 1522-7464.
- Tononi, Fabio, “Intermediality and Immersion in Gaudenzio Ferrari’s Adoration of the Magi in Chapel V of the Sacred Mountain of Varallo”, PsicoArt: Rivista di Arte e Psicologia, Vol. 10 (2020), pp. 1–18.
