= Castel San Giovanni =

- Comune
- Comune di Castel San Giovanni
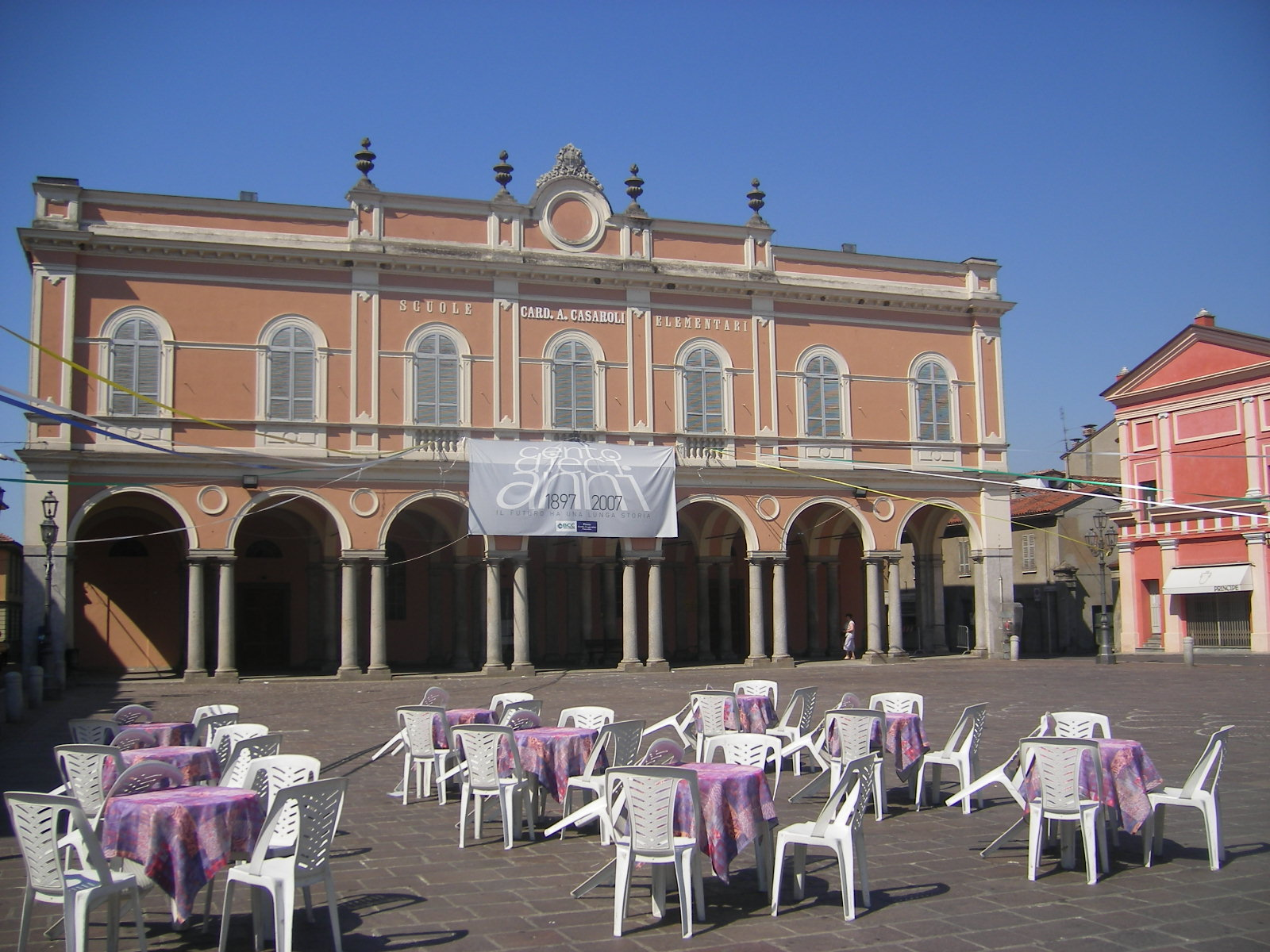

- Coat of arms

- Location within Italy Location within Emilia-Romagna
- Coordinates: 45°3′N 9°26′E
- Country: Italy
- Region: Emilia-Romagna
- Province: Piacenza (PC)
- Frazioni: Bosco Tosca, Creta, Fontana Pradosa, Ganaghello, Pievetta, Campo d'oro

Government
  - Mayor: Valentina Stragliati

Area
  - Total: 44 km^{2} (17 sq mi)
- Elevation: 74 m (243 ft)

Population (31 August 2010)
  - Total: 13,917
  - Density: 320/km^{2} (820/sq mi)
- Demonym: Castellani
- Time zone: UTC+1 (CET)
  - Summer (DST): UTC+2 (CEST)
- Postal code: 29015
- Dialing code: 0523
- Patron saint: St. John the Baptist
- Saint day: June 24
- Website: Official website

Castel San Giovanni (Piacentino: Castél San Giuàn) is a town and comune in the province of Piacenza, Emilia-Romagna, Italy.

== History ==
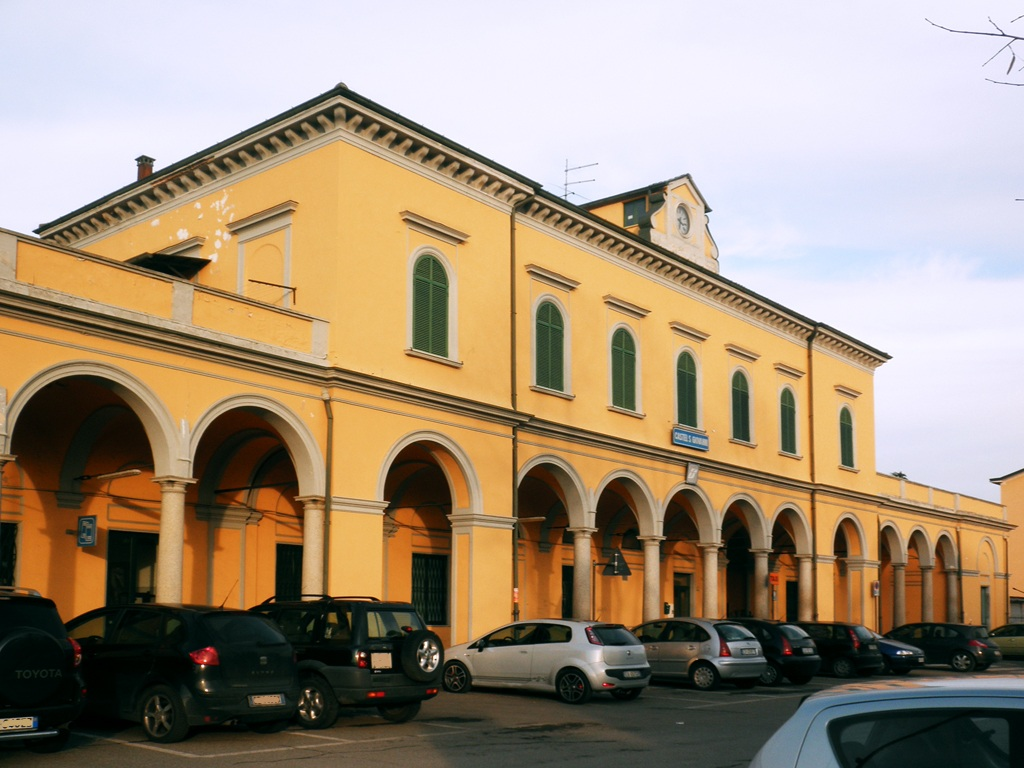
The railway station

The origins of the town are probably related to an ancient pieve called Olubra and a fortress called Castellus Milonus, which preceded the construction of a new castle by Alberto Scoto in 1290 (now also disappeared).

After a period under the Dal Verme family of lords-condottieri, it became part of the Duchy of Parma and Piacenza in 1485.

== Main sights ==
- The Collegiata di San Giovanni Battista (14th century), with Baroque portals and a 1496 crucifix by Giacomo del Maino and his son Giovanni Angelo.
- Church of San Giovanni Battista (12th century)
- Villa Braghieri-Albesani (18th century), with several frescoed rooms.

== Famous people ==
- Agostino Casaroli, Catholic cardinal
- Pippo Santonastaso, Italian actor
- Bongiorni Matteo, Italian institution

== Twin towns ==
Castel San Giovanni is twinned with:

- Slunj, Croatia
- Dunellen, New Jersey, United States
