= Villa Braghieri-Albesani, Castel San Giovanni =

Villa Braghieri or Villa Braghieri-Albesani is a Baroque architecture style rural palace, located on the Via Emilia Piacentina, in the town of Castel San Giovanni, near Piacenza, Region of Emilia-Romagna, Italy.

The villa was begun during the late 17th century by Count Daniele Chiapponi, but construction continued till the end of the 18th century. Part of the designs were directed by Carlo Scotti, nephew of the Marquise Teodora Chiapponi. In 1809, the villa became property of the land-owning Albesani family. By 1905, the villa was bought by the Braghieri family. Carlo Braghieri, a prominent lawyer, willed the property by 1971 to the Ente Comunale di Assistenza of Castel San Giovanni, and it 1996, it became property of the comune.

The villa has 23 rooms, each with a different theme or purpose. They are richly furnished and decorated with stucco and painted decorations.

The comune of Castel San Giovanni, employed the architect Marcello Spigaroli to transform parts of the villa into museum rooms, historical archives, and a modern municipal library. The site is used for cultural events. The museum will display artifacts owned by cardinal Agostino Casaroli and the Tidone Valley's Ethnographic Museum. The surrounding park is open to the public
