= Pippo Santonastaso =

Italian actor

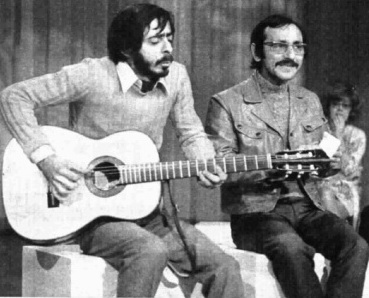
- Pippo Santonastaso (right) with his brother Mario
- Born: Giuseppe Santonastaso; 25 May 1936 (age 89); Castel San Giovanni, Piacenza, Italy
- Occupation: actor

Giuseppe "Pippo" Santonastaso (born 25 May 1936) is an Italian actor and comedian.

== Life and career ==
Born in Castel San Giovanni, Piacenza, to a Neapolitan family, Santonastaso created an original comic duo with his younger brother Mario (1937 – 8 January 2021), performing successfully in their region and soon also on television, in several RAI variety shows. Following his television success, in the second half of the 1970s he started a parallel career of character actor in numerous comedy films, several of them as sidekick of Adriano Celentano. He was main actor just once, in the commedia sexy all'italiana Geometra Prinetti selvaggiamente Osvaldo.
