= Tiburzio del Maino =

Italian sculptor

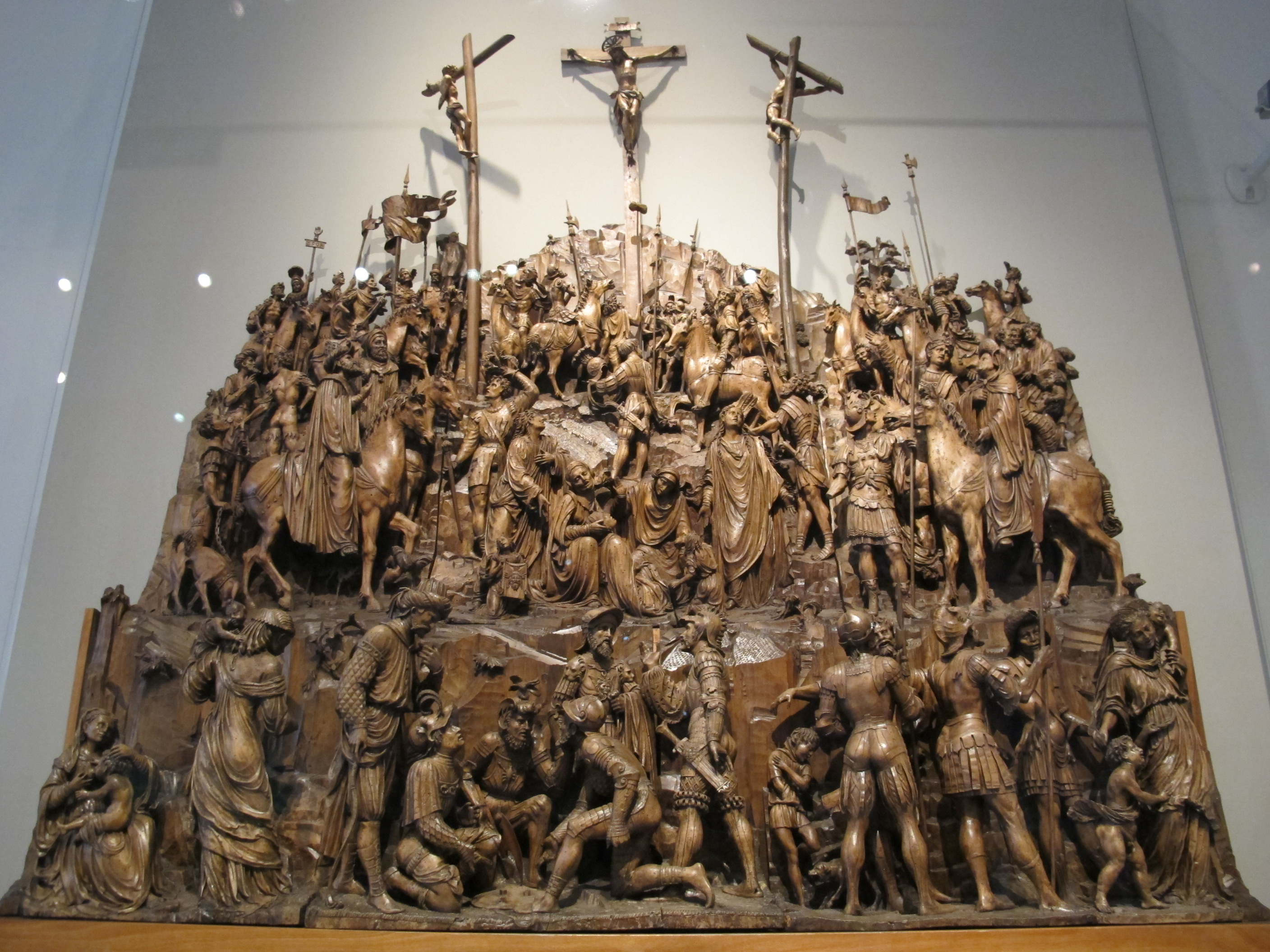
Crucifixion altarpiece by the brothers, now in the Victoria and Albert Museum in London

Tiburzio del Maino (died before 1536) was an Italian sculptor, recorded as being active in Pavia between 1496 and 1531.

He trained under his father Giacomo del Maino (head of one of the most important woodcarving workshops in the Duchy of Milan in the early 16th century) and after their father's death often collaborated with his brother Giovanni Angelo. In 1496, when his father decided to move his workshop from Milan to Pavia, Tiburzio was already a magister a lignamine ('master in wood') in his own right. He had his own workshop from at least 1526 onwards.

The two brothers worked together on the most important commissions, such as the altarpieces in the Sanctuary of the Assumption in Morbegno, the church of San Lorenzo in Ardenno, and the Sanctuary of the Madonna in Tirano. Compared to that of Giovan Angelo, Tiburzio's artistic language is harsher and more cutting, less attentive to the innovations of Lombard classicism. On this stylistic basis, art historians try to separate out each brother's contribution – for example, it is believed that the Lamentation in the church of Santa Maria in Bellano is mainly by Tiburzio.

== Bibliography (in Italian) ==
- Angela Guglielmetti, Scultura lignea nella diocesi di Novara tra '400 e '500. Proposta per un catalogo, Novara 2000.
- Marco Albertario, «Clari et celebres habiti sunt, ut antiqui superasse credantur: Giacomo, Giovanni Angelo e Tiburtio Del Maino attraverso i documenti pavesi (+496-1536)», in «Bollettino della Società pavese di storia patria», LII, Pavia 2000, 105–173.
- Albertario, Marco, Intorno a Giovanni Angelo Del Maino, in “Maestri della scultura in legno nel ducato degli Sforza", exhibition catalogue, Silvana Editoriale, 2005.
- Giovanni Agosti, Jacopo Stoppa, Giovanni Angelo Del Maino. Madonna svenuta, in Giovanni Agosti, Jacopo Stoppa, Marco Tanzi (ed.), «Il Rinascimento nelle terre ticinesi. Da Bramantino a Bernardino Luini. Officina Libraria, Milano 2010.
- Tiburzio del Maino entry (in Italian) in the Enciclopedia Treccani
