= Sant'Anna Altarpiece =

Painting by Gaudenzio Ferrari

The Sant'Anna Altarpiece is the earliest surviving work in tempera by Gaudenzio Ferrari in the city of Vercelli. He received the commission for the work on 26 July 1508 from the Congregation of Sant'Anna for the church of Sant'Anna and completed it on 7 May 1509.

The main body of the altarpiece was made up of six panels, all of which survive:

- Joachim Expelled from the Temple (Galleria Sabauda)
- Madonna and Child with Saint Anne and the brother donors (Galleria Sabauda)
- Saints Joachim and Anne meeting at the Golden Gate (lower register) and God the Father (upper register) (Galleria Sabauda)
- The Angel Gabriel (National Gallery)
- Virgin of the Annunciation (National Gallery)
