= San Michele Maggiore, Pavia =

Church in Pavia, Italy

Coordinates: 45°10′56″N 9°9′25″E

Basilica of San Michele Maggiore
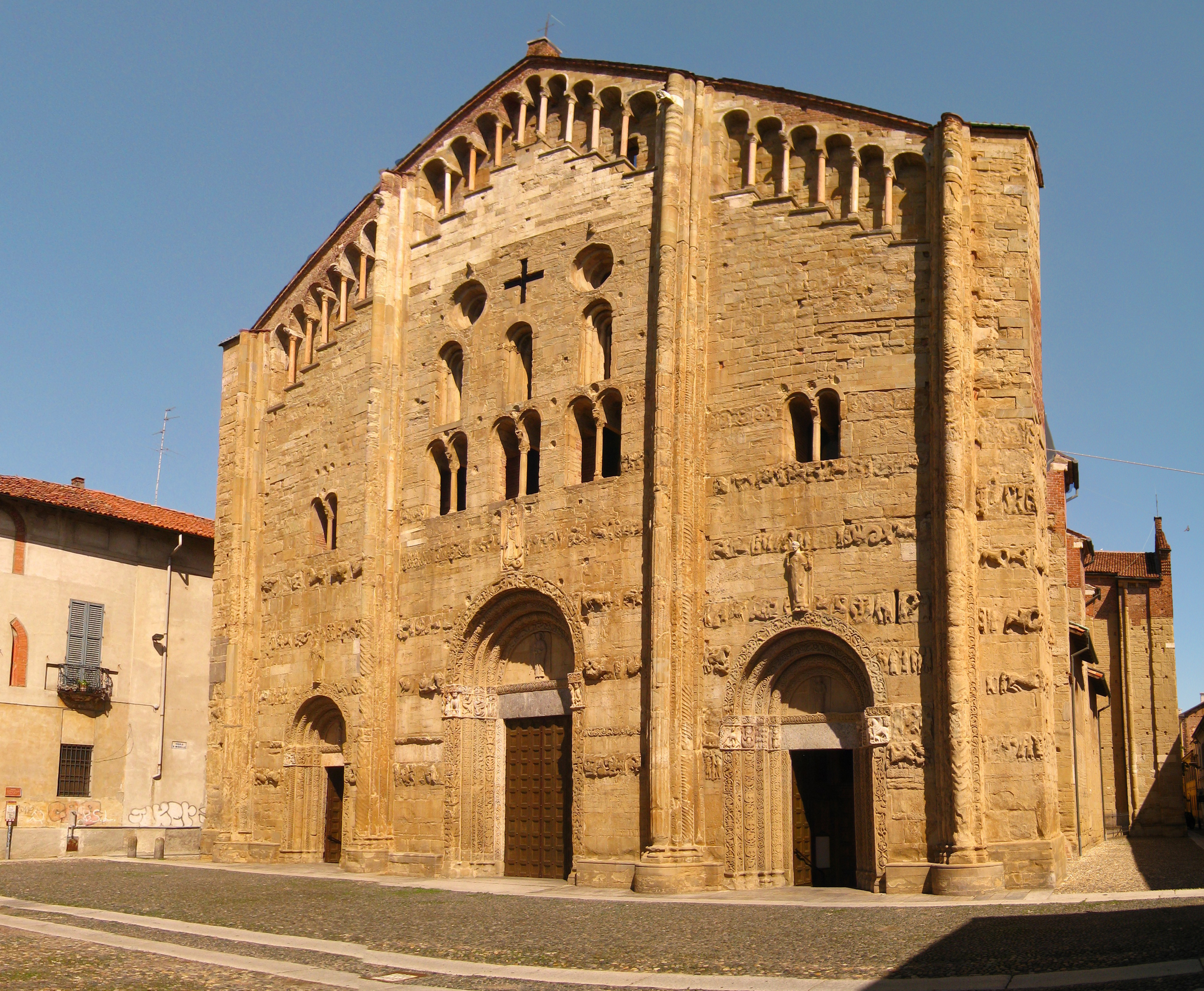
- Façade.

Religion
- Affiliation: Catholic
- Province: Pavia
- Year consecrated: 662–671
- Status: Active

Location
- Location: Pavia, Italy
- Interactive map of Basilica of San Michele Maggiore

Architecture
- Type: Church
- Style: Romanesque
- Completed: 1130

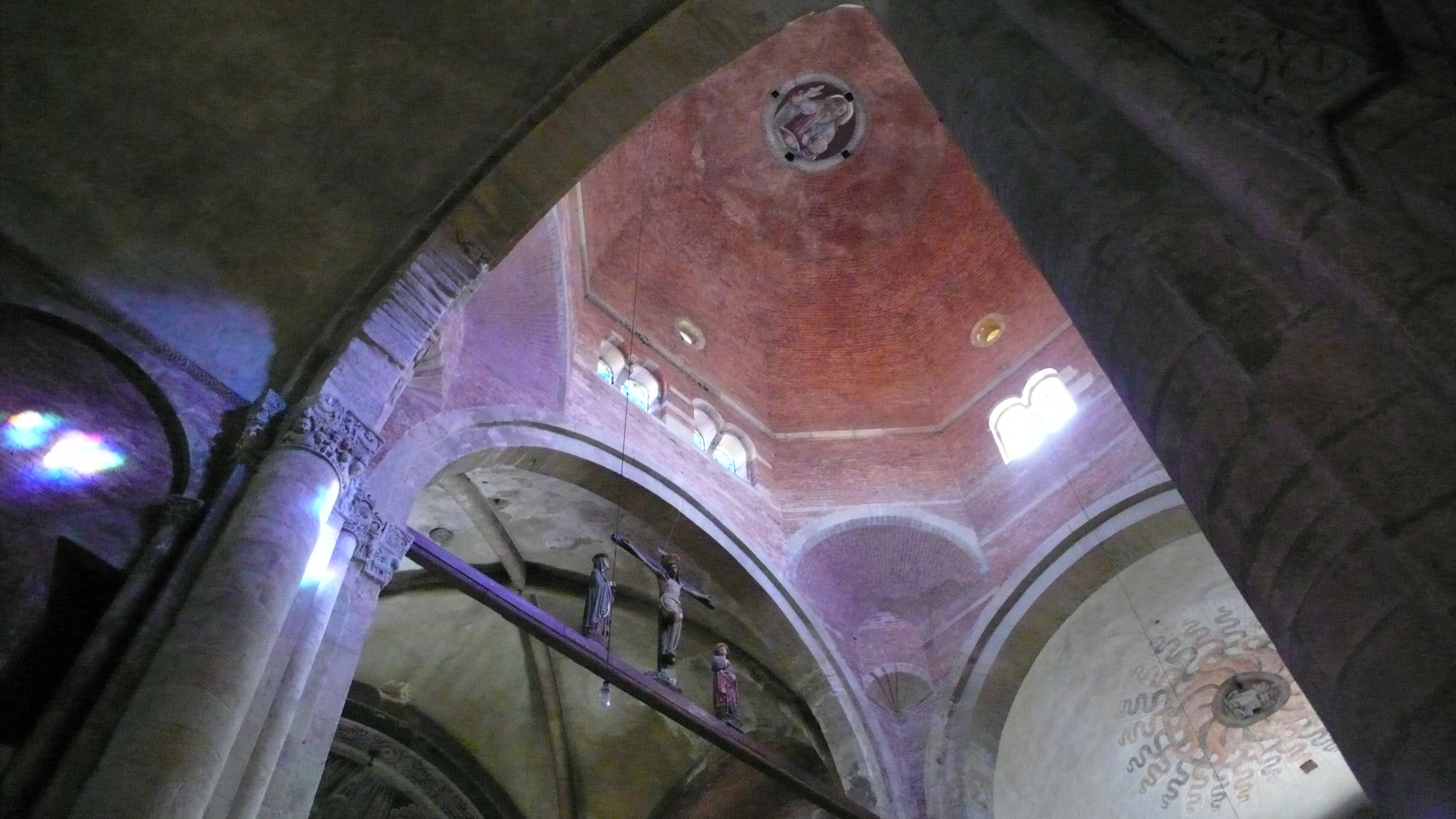
View of the crossing dome.

The Basilica of San Michele Maggiore is a Roman Catholic church in Pavia, region of Lombardy, Italy. The building, dating to the 11–12th centuries, is a well-preserved example of the Lombard Romanesque style.

== History ==
Archeological evidence, such as Ostrogoth silverware found at the site in 1968, suggests the site may have housed an early Christian basilica dating to the fifth century. The silverware is now preserved in the Pavia Civic Museums. Between 662 and 671, a church was built at the desire of King Grimoald. Dedicated to St Michael, it was built on the location of the Lombard Palace chapel. This church was destroyed by a fire in 1004, and only the lower part of the bell tower dates to the 7th-century church. The construction of the current crypt, choir and transept was begun in the late 11th century and was completed by 1130. The vaults of the nave, originally with two grossly squared groin-vaulted spans, were replaced in 1489 by the design of master architect Agostino de Candia in four rectangular spans, and the structure was created by his father the renown Pavia master mason Iacopo da Candia.

The basilica was the seat of numerous important events, including the coronations of Berengar I (888), Guy III (889), Louis III (900), Rudolph II (922), Hugh (926), Berengar II and his son Adalbert (950), Arduin (1002), Henry II (1004) and Frederick Barbarossa (1155).

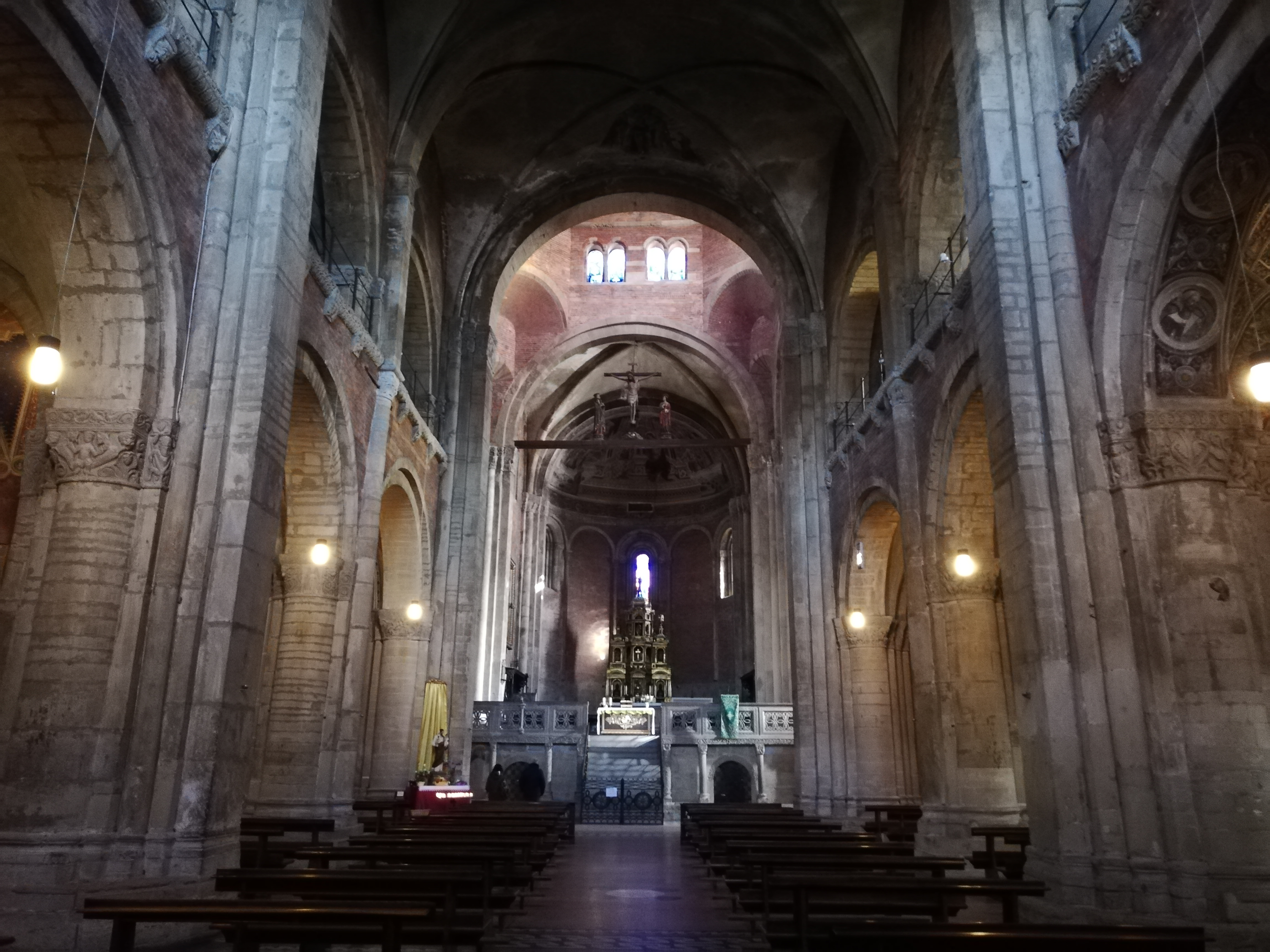
Interior.

Over the centuries, the basilica hosted other sumptuous ceremonies and coronations, such as in February 1397, when Gian Galeazzo Visconti wanted to celebrate the diploma of the emperor Wenceslas in October 1396, with which the succession system of the Duchy of Milan was regulated, basing it on male primogeniture and for this the county of Pavia was created, reserved exclusively for the heir to the throne. On this occasion, the lord had the ceremony celebrated by tracing the models of early medieval coronations: in fact, he was welcomed by the bishop and the aristocrats of the city outside the walls and, with the ducal and comital insignia, he reached the basilica in procession where a solemn mass was celebrated, which was followed by tournaments of knights and banquets. In homage to the royal prerogatives of the basilica, the first duke of Milan, Gian Galeazzo Visconti, ordered that, after his death, his body be buried in the Certosa di Pavia, while his heart was to be kept in the basilica of San Michele.

During some works carried out in the basilica in 1968, precious silver artefacts of Ostrogothic manufacture were found underneath a tomb dated between the 11th and 12th centuries, now kept in the Pavia Civic Museums. These are objects, plates, a spoon and a fragment of a cup, non-liturgical and hidden, in all probability, before the tenth century, perhaps part of the original treasury of the basilica.

== Architecture ==
San Michele Maggiore can be considered the prototype of other important medieval churches in Pavia such as San Pietro in Ciel d'Oro and San Teodoro. However, it differs from latter in the use of sandstone instead of bricks, and for its Latin cross layout with a nave and two aisles and a long transept. San Michele's transept, provided with a true façade, a false apse and a barrel vault, differs from the rest of the church and constitutes a nearly independent section of the edifice. Its length (38 m, compared to the 55 m of the whole basilica), contributes to this impression.

At the crossing of nave and transept is the octagonal dome, a 30 m-high asymmetrical structure supported on squinches, in the Lombard-Romanesque style. It is reportedly the earliest example of this form in Lombardy. The façade is decorated by numerous sandstone sculptures, of religious or profane themes; they are however now much deteriorated. The façade has five double and two single mullioned windows and a cross, which are a 19th-century reconstruction of what was thought be the original scheme. Bas reliefs in horizontal bands portray human, animal and fantastic figures. Over the minor portals are portrayed St. Ennodius, bishop of Pavia, and St. Eleucadius, archbishop of Ravenna. In the lunettes are angels which, according to a caption sculpted there, have the role of ambassadors of the faithful's words into heaven.Bronze doors, coloured mosaics, geometric designs, bronze pilasters.

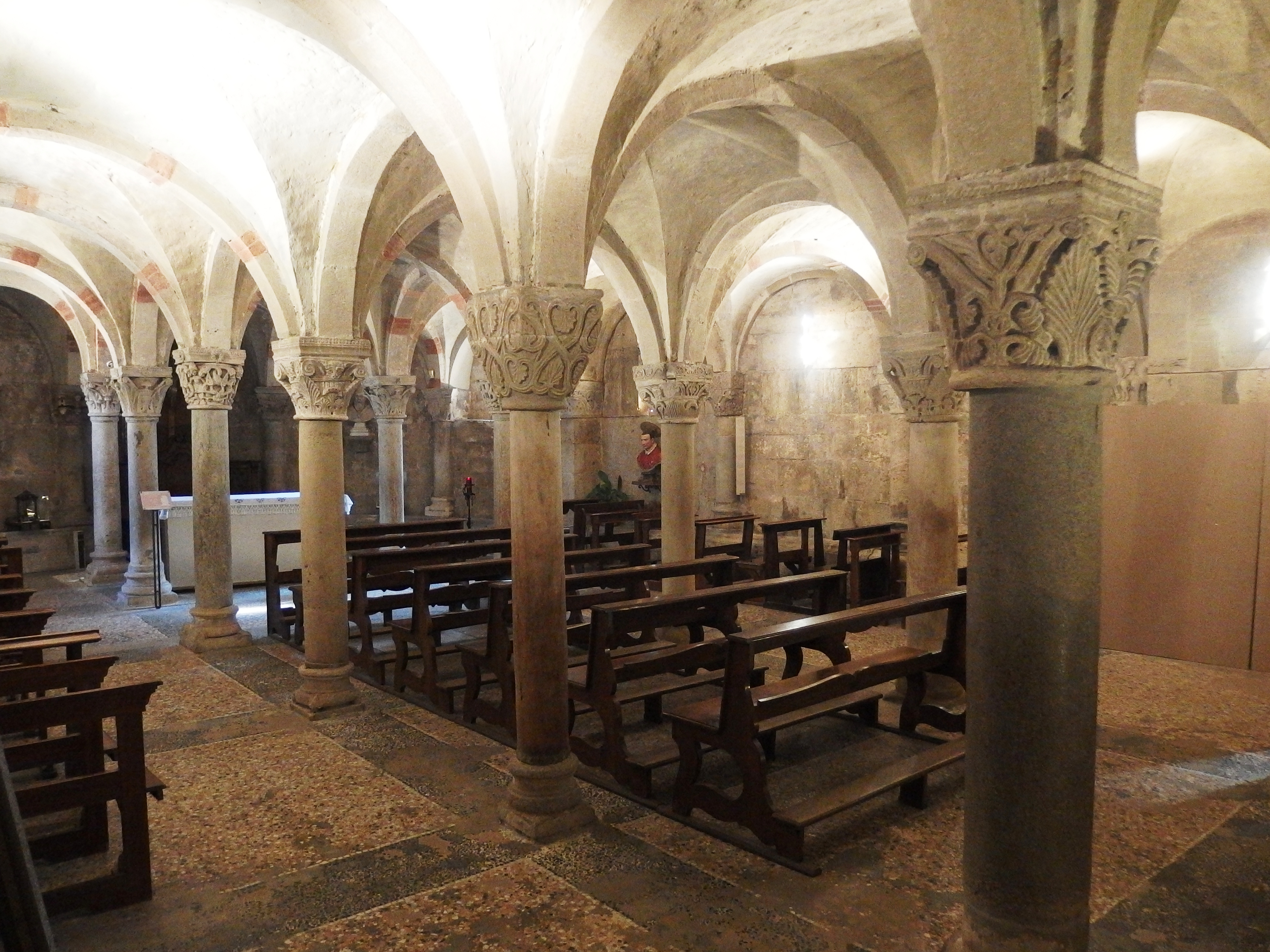
Crypt.

The main nave now has four spans or four bays, like the side aisles. The bays of the main nave have a rectangular plan with the longest side parallel to the facade and are covered by cross vaults with ribs. The vaults were built between 1488 and 1491 by Iacopo da Candia and by his son, the master architect Agostino de Candia. Originally, however, there were only two cross vaults with a roughly square plan which probably directly supported the roof covering. Instead, according to Piero Sanpaolesi, who conducted the restoration work on the external facades in 1966–1968, the central nave was covered by two domes, hemispherical or low-mounted, on the model of Romanesque-Byzantine basilicas such as San Marco in Venice, set on spandrels whose remains are still present above the fifteenth-century cross vaults

The aisles have matronaea with statical function. The four chapels in correspondence of the second and four spans of the aisles are a later addition. under the apse, which has a large 16th-century fresco, is the high altar (1383) housing the remains of Sts. Ennodius and Eleucadius. The presbytery has fragments of a notable pavement mosaic with the Labours of the Months and mythological themes. In the transept there is a two meter high crucifix, coated in silver leaf and commissioned by the abbess of the monastery of Santa Maria Teodote Raingarda in the second half of the 10th century. The crucifix was moved to this basilica after the suppression of the monastery in 1799.

In the right transept are preserved the large Altarpiece of Saint Stephen, created around 1496 by Giacomo Del Maino, and, in the adjoining chapel, another wooden work: a Nativity scene carved in 1473 by Baldino da Surso.

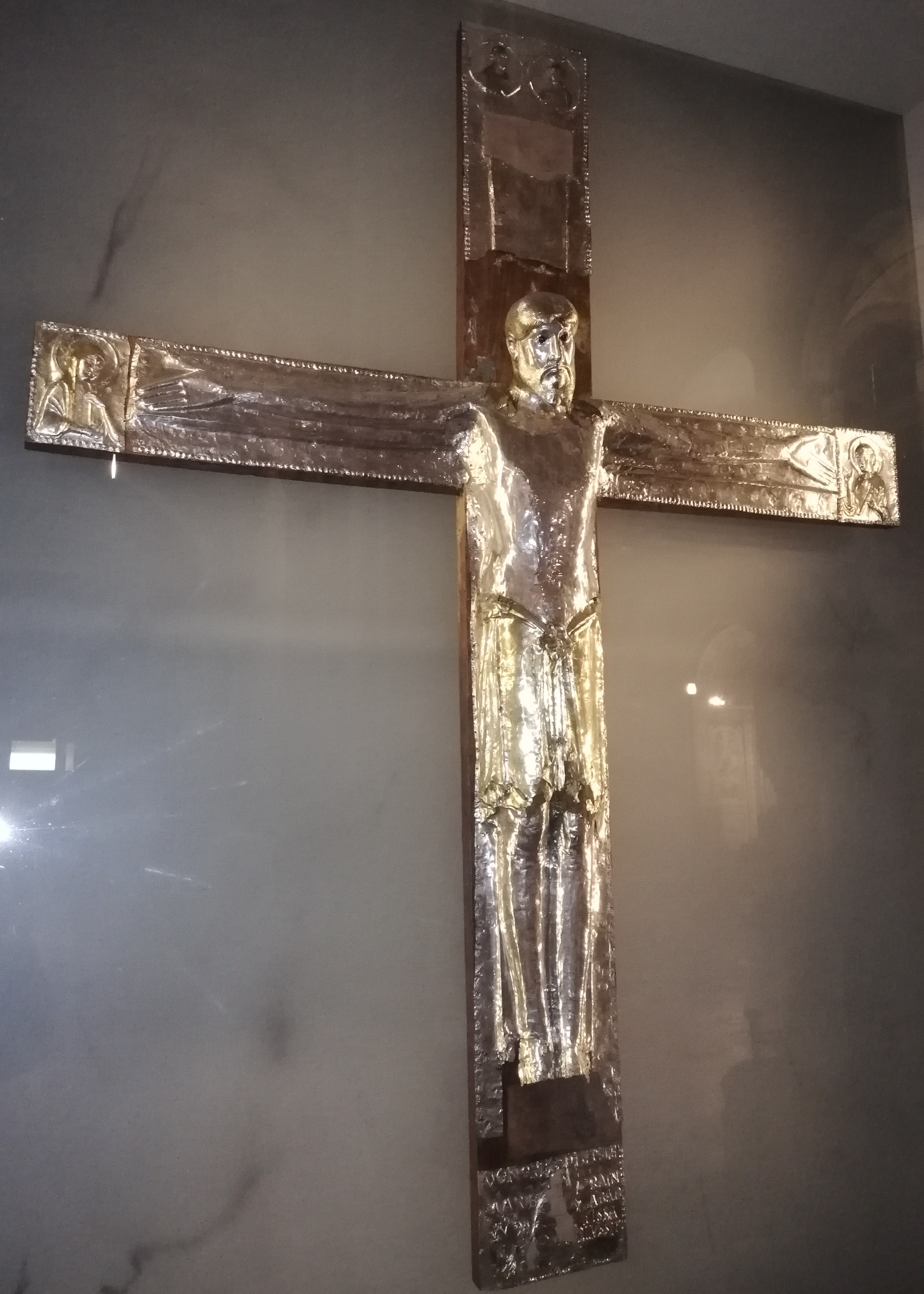
The cross of the Abbess Raingarda, 963–965.

Altar of the Virgin: the altarpiece, depicting the Virgin between Saints Rocco and Sebastian was executed by Guglielmo Caccia in 1601. In the left arm of the transept there is the altar of Santa Lucia, whose altarpiece, depicting the martyrdom of the saint, is also the work of Guglielmo Caccia and the baroque altar of Sant'Anna, rich in Baroque stucco, which houses a painting representing the Virgin and Child, St Joseph and St Anne by the Novarese painter Pietro Antonio de Pietri. The crypt, with a nave and two aisles, is located immediately under the altar: it houses beautifully decorated capitals and the monument of the Blessed Martino Salimbene (1491). To the left of the altar is a small marble statue depicting the Madonna and Child, in the Late Gothic style, created by Cristoforo Mantegazza between 1455 and 1465. Next to the altar in the crypt is the treasure of Saint Brice, a group of liturgical furnishings from the 12th century consisting of a thurible, a bronze bell, a silver-plated copper vessel with set glass, some wooden pyxes and fragments of fabric of silk and gold threads, found in 1402 in the church of San Martino Siccomario and brought in 1407 to the church of Santa Maria Capella in Pavia. In 1810, when the church of Santa Maria Capella (documented from 970) was deconsecrated, the treasure was transferred to the basilica. The furnishings are kept inside wooden cases with friezes in silver foil dating back to 1765 and were erroneously believed up to 1863 to be relics of Brice of Tours, while in reality the objects belonged to an individual named Brice who was not better identified.

== The royal coronation ceremony ==
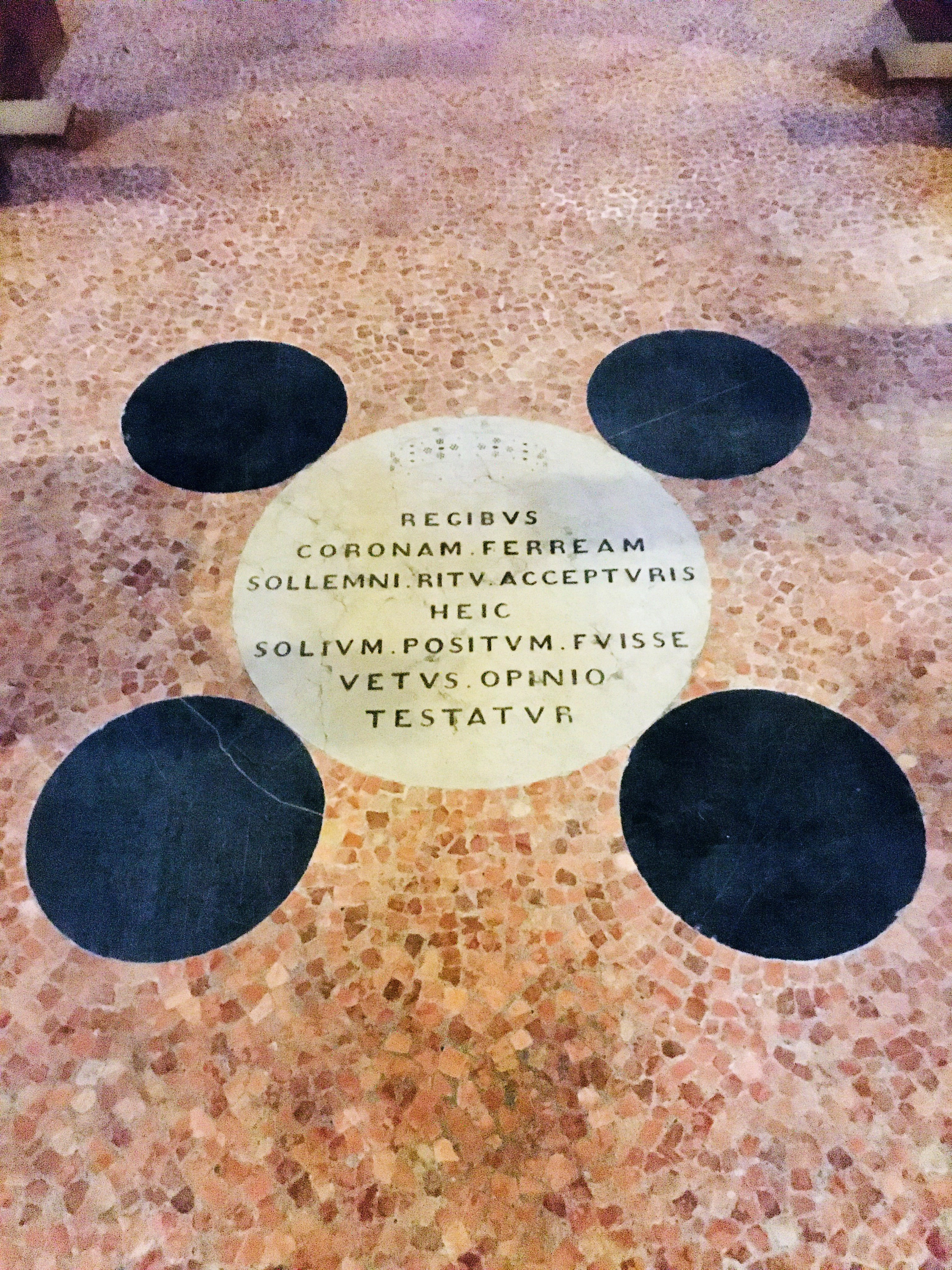
The five stones, already mentioned in the Honorantiae civitatis Papiae (about 1020), above which the throne was placed during coronations.

The presence of two portals, north and south of the basilica and the monumental transept of the same, a feature common to several German imperial churches but completely absent in the religious architecture of northern Italy, highlights the role of the basilica as the seat of royal coronations. The processions of the monarch's enthronement began in the small square in front of the northern portal (Piazzetta Azzani), which overlooks the Via Francigena and originally connected the basilica to the Royal Palace. Not surprisingly, the writing placed on the lintel of the portal invites you to pray to Christ for salvation using a term, vote, used in the Christian Middle Ages also for prayers addressed to the emperor's well-being. Also on the portal, a second inscription also appears around an angelic figure: hic est domus refughi atque consultationis, with clear reference, in the domus refughi to the domus regi (the royal palace).

Once inside the basilica, the procession moved towards the four black stones placed in the central nave, on which the throne was placed. During the month of May, when coronations generally took place, the light penetrates from the windows of the apse and of the lantern light up first the figure of the King-Year placed at the top of the mosaic of the labyrinth located on the main altar and then the beam of light, between 10.30 and 11.00 in the morning, extends over the five stones. The inscription in the center circle was added in the 19th century by the prominent philologist Tommaso Vallauri, a professor at the University of Turin:

Regibus Coronam Ferream Solemni Ritu Accepturis Heic Solium Positum Fuisse Vetus Opinio Testatur

At the end of the ceremony, the procession left the southern door (facing via Capsoni), the Porta Speciosa, where the Traditio Legis is depicted, also a representation of Gelasius I's doctrine of the separation of powers in the Christian world: that of the Church and that of the Empire.

== See also ==
- High medieval domes
