= Assumption Altarpiece (Morbegno) =

16th-century wooden sculpture

The Ancona dell'Assunta (Assumption Altarpiece) is a 16th-century wooden sculpture by the carver Giovan Angelo Del Maino, assisted by his brother Tiburzio between 1516 and 1519. It was decorated by Gaudenzio Ferrari and Fermo Stella. It was produced as the frame for an altarpiece on the high altar of the Santuario dell'Assunta in Morbegno, Sondrio.

== History ==
The high altar was begun in 1418 and underwent many alterations until finally being completed in 1516.. The work was commissioned by the Company of the Battuti, who had been that church's patrons since its foundation in 1422, as shown by the sums detailed in the 'Liber credentiae'. There is also a notarised deed dated 7 March 1524 showing the payment to Ferrari and Stella for gilding the altarpiece. These payments confirms the collaboration between the two artists.

The frame is a typically Baroque telling of the Gospel in four rows in the form of a small temple. The central part has an early church fresco of the Madonna and Child from around 1440. The last payment for the wooden part to De' Maio was dated 19 October 1519 and then the first payment was made to Ferrari on 29 May 1520, which makes it seem that Ferrari had already delivered his own work prior to 1519. The collaboration with Stella was later - it appears that Ferrari was present at the arrangement of the artefact in 1525–1526. This was a period of intense collaboration between the two artists, and Stella learned the lessons that would later shape his own painting style.

Comparing the payments between the three artists: Del Maino, Ferrari and Stella allows us to identify how much work each contributed, and from these it appears that Stella had completed a good part of the work. It is also important to consider that the payments also included the costs of the materials which remained the responsibility of the executor, which at times were very burdensome making the net compensation negligible.

== Bibliography (in Italian) ==
- Zeno Birolli (1976). "Fermo Stella". Pittori bergamaschi del Cinquecento. Bergamo. pp. 211–212.
- Romano, Giovanni (2006). Fermo Stella e Sperindio Cagnoli seguaci di Gaudenzio Ferrari. Una bottega d'arte nel Cinquecento padano. Cinisello Balsamo: Catalogo della mostra (Bergamo, settembre-dicembre 2006), Silvana Editoriale.
