= Fermo Stella =

Italian painter

Fermo Stella (c. 1490 – c. 1562) was an Italian painter of Lombardy and Piedmont, mostly in rural churches and sanctuaries. Art historians from the 19th century cite erroneously Fermo as active at dates that range from the 15th century to 1577.

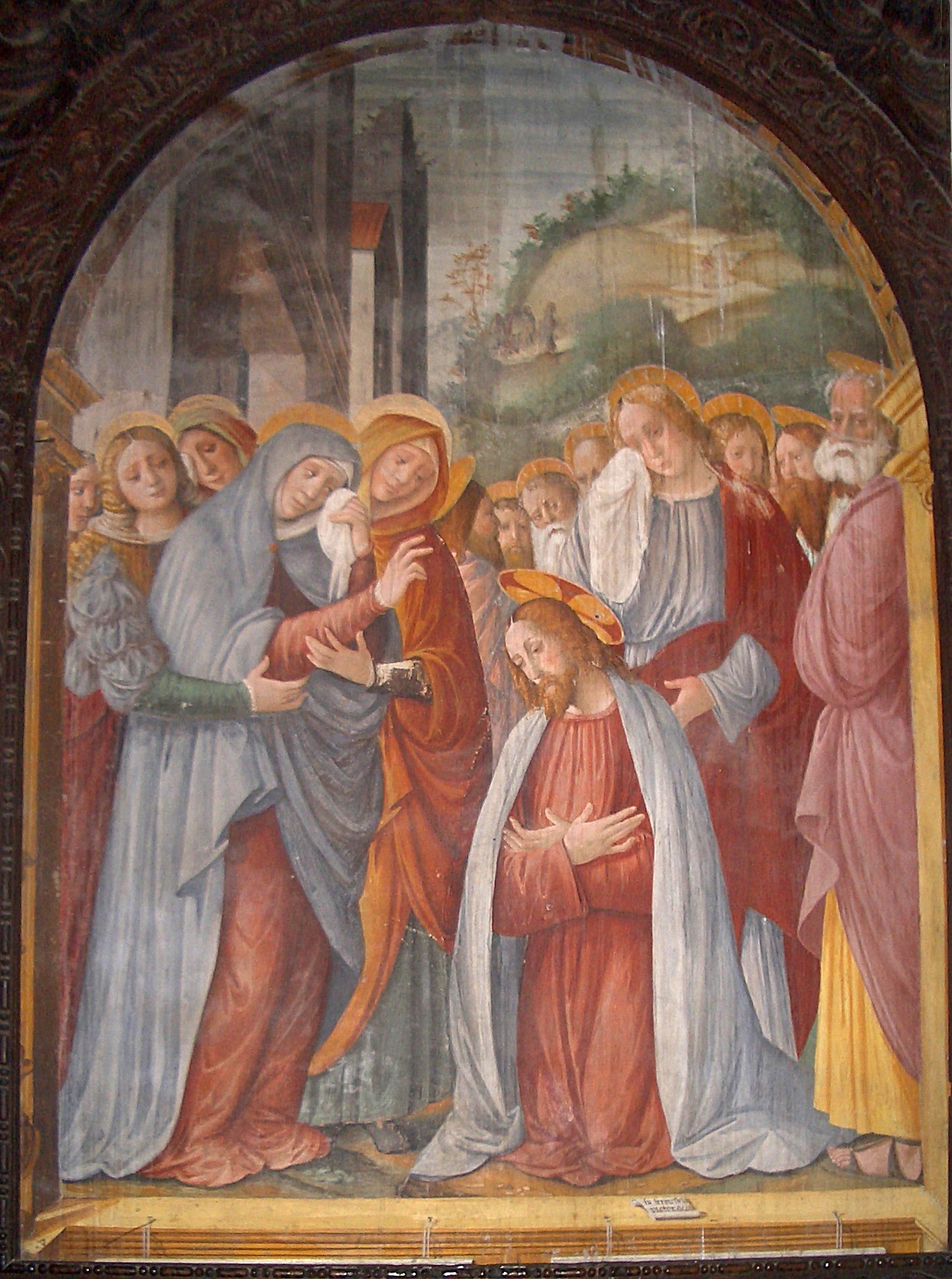
Santa Maria Delle Grazie, Varallo, frescoes by Stella

== Biography ==
Born in Caravaggio, he was a pupil or a follower of Gaudenzio Ferrari. Collaboration is suggested as early as circa 1510 with Gaudenzio. Documents show they worked together in Morbegno on the Ancona dell'Assunta (1514-1516) and in 1522. Fermo has left a number of sacred subjects throughout the north Lombardy and east Piedmont, including at the Sacro Monte of Varallo, where he worked alongside Bernardino Lanino circa 1530. He painted the Polyptych of St Ambrose (1547) for the church of Sant'Ambrogio, Omegna. He also appears to have painted the Polyptych in the church of Sant'Alessandro della Croce, Bergamo.
