= Giacomo del Maino =

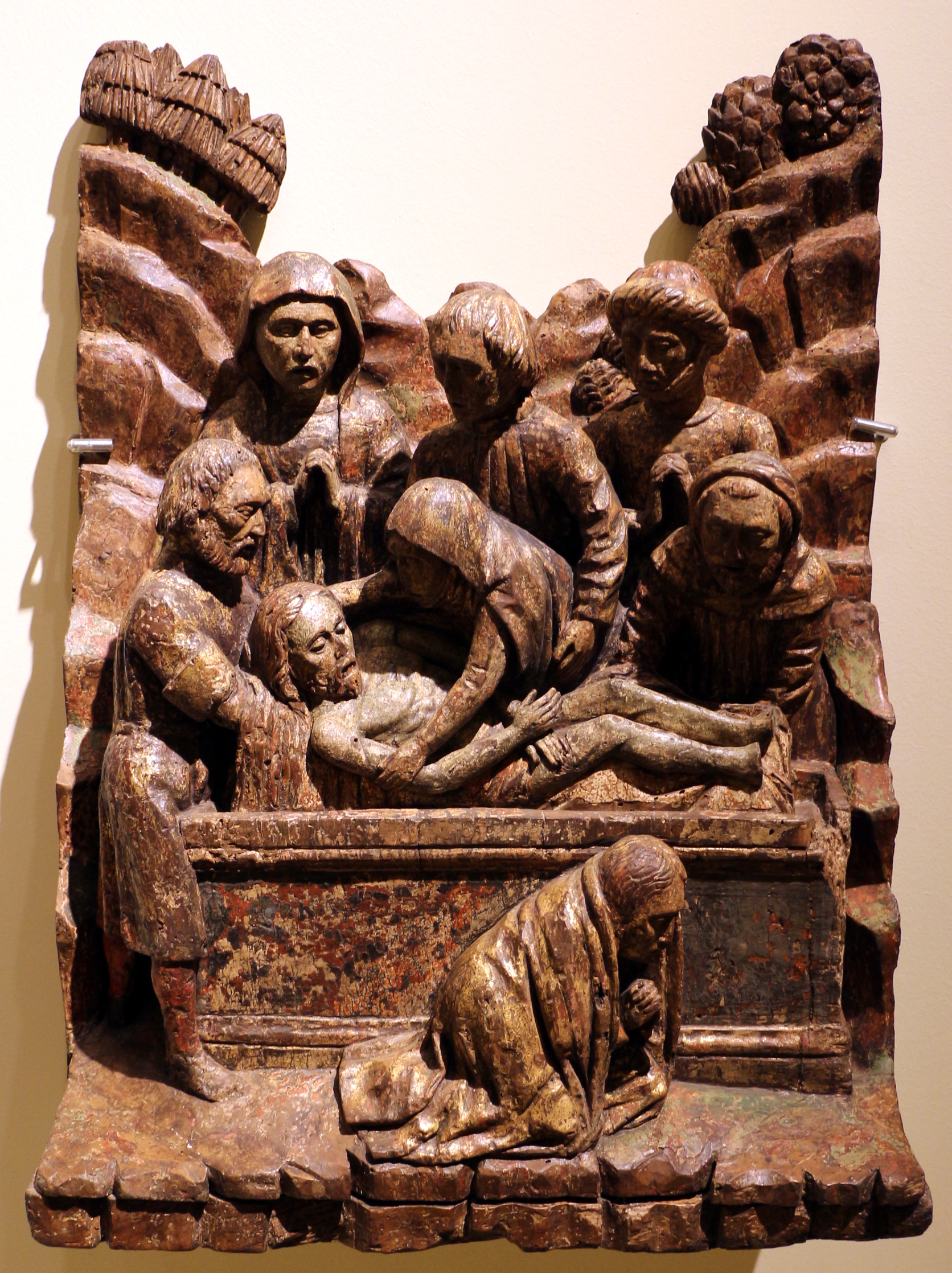
Deposition, c. 1450–1475, Castello Sforzesco, Milan

Giacomo del Maino (before 1469 – 1503 or 1505) was an Italian architect and sculptor. Descended from a family of woodcarvers, he headed one of the main workshops active in the Duchy of Milan in the second half of the 15th century and trained his sons Giovanni Angelo and Tiburzio in the art.

== Life ==
Del Maino's artistic personality was attentive to the emerging Renaissance innovations in the fields of architecture and the figurative arts. He, the de Donati brothers and the so-called Trognano Master marked a very fertile period for the production of wooden religious artworks, starting with large altarpieces.

Among the first recorded works by him is the choir of the Basilica of Sant'Ambrogio in Milan, commissioned in 1469, decorated with plants, animals and small figures derived from miniatures in the Tacuina sanitatis and at the top a frieze decorated with tondi busts of saints and prophets and standing statues of angels. On the end sides are twelve scenes from the life of Saint Ambrose. The choir stalls of Santa Maria del Monte sopra Varese (1478) feature ends decorated with scenes dominated by large plant motifs, bringing his style close to that of Baldino da Surso

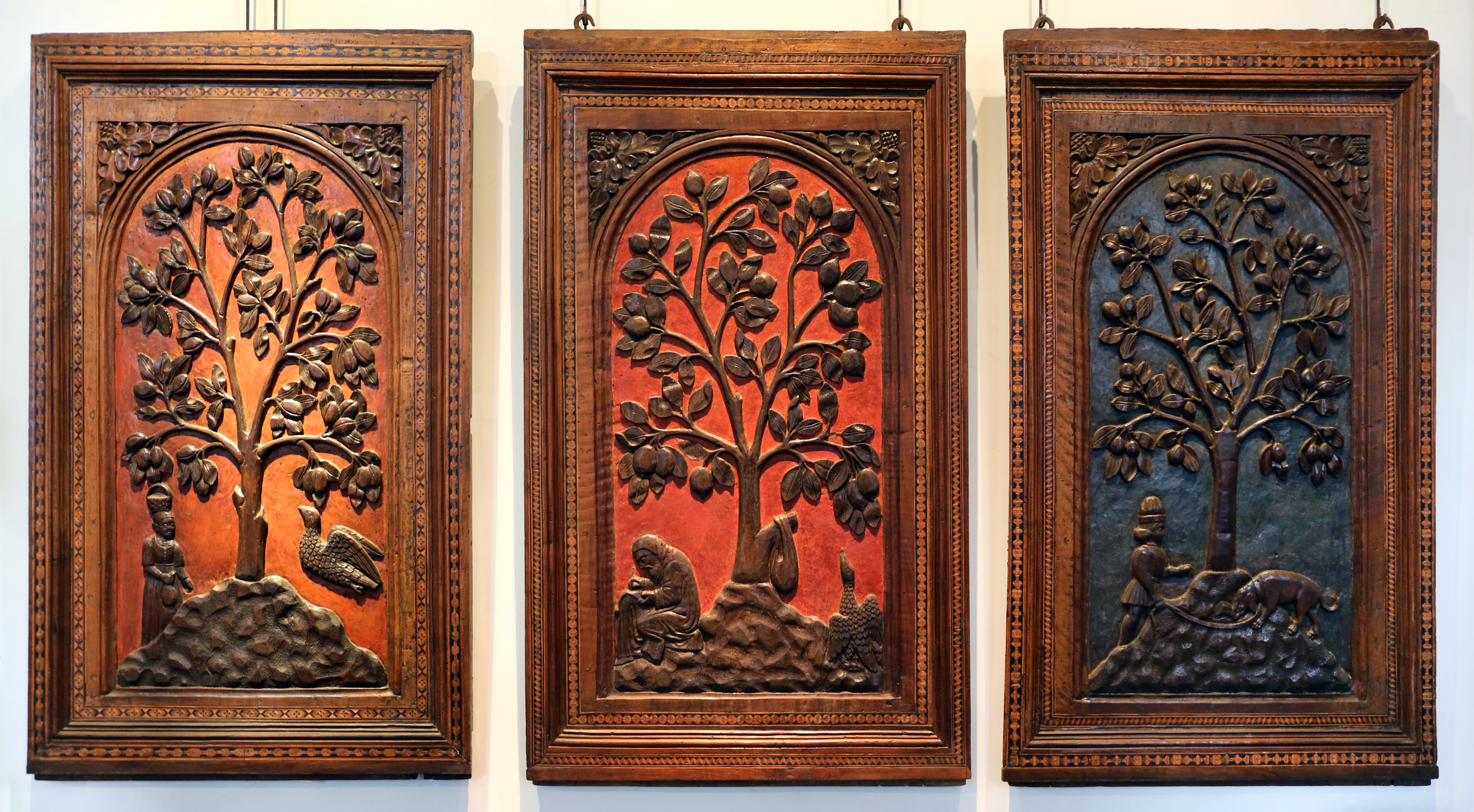
Ends of the choir stalls in Sant'Ambrogio, Milan, 1469–1471

He is most notable for making the c.1485 altarpiece to house da Vinci's Madonna of the Rocks. The contract to produce it was signed by the Confraternity of the Immaculate Conception on 8 April 1480 for the church of San Francesco Grande in Milan (c.1483) - the surviving documents witness to the importance of the work which included a "list of ornaments" involving da Vinci and Ambrogio de Predis. This work likely inspired that altarpieces, all still in situ, created in Valtellina - that in San Maurizio church in Ponte in Valtellina, produced in collaboration with Bernardino de Donati (Immaculate Altarpiece), that in Sernio, the oratory of Santa Maria della Neve, the Madonna and Child on the high altar of the Santuario della Beata Vergine delle Grazie in Grosotto, the Madonna and Child in S. Matteo a Valle church in Morbegno.

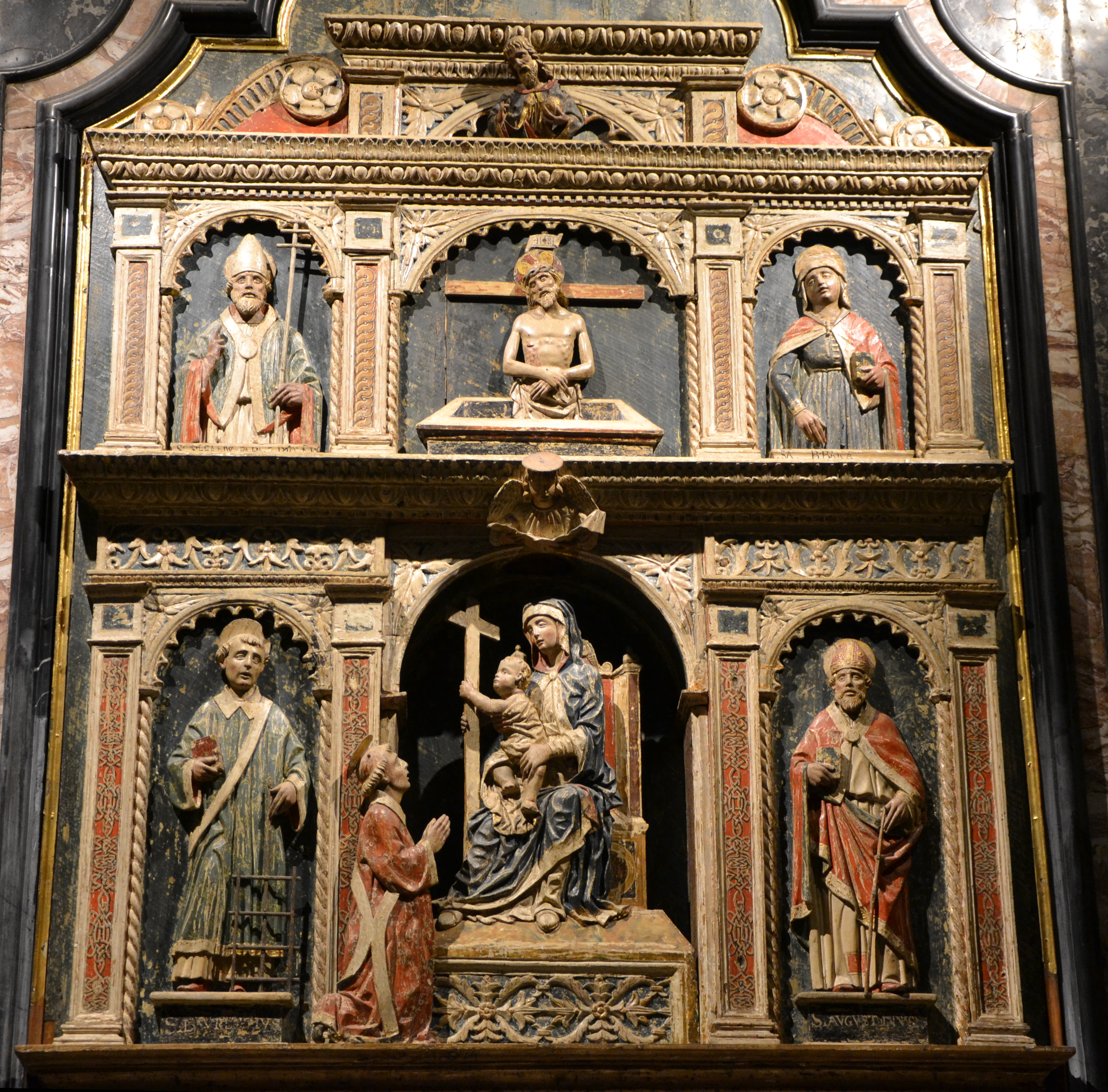
Santo Stefano altarpiece, San Michele Maggiore (Pavia)

In 1496, when his two sons had both been recognised as master woodworkers, Giacomo decided to move his workshop from Milan to Pavia, perhaps attracted by important commissions to decorate the Certosa thanks to contacts with Giovanni Antonio Amadeo. At that time Giacomo continued to manage the studio - the first works in which Giovan Angelo's greater artistic talent can be seen are the result of close collaboration with his father, such as in the imposing "Santo Stefano Altarpiece" in the Basilica of San Michele Maggiore in Pavia.

== Bibliography (in Italian) ==
- Richard V. Schofield, Janice Shell, Grazioso Sironi, Giovanni Antonio Amadeo/ I documenti, Edizioni New Press, Como 1989.
- Raffaella Ganna, Giacomo del Maino, Giovan Pietro De Donati e altri artisti a Santa Maria del Monte sopra Varese, in «Arte Lombarda», 117, 2, 1996, 64–71.
- Paola Viotto, Miracolati da Caterina da Pallanza. Nuovi documenti per Santa Maria del Monte, in «Tracce», 2, 1996.
- Casciaro Raffaele, Precisazioni su Giacomo del Maino, in «Rassegna di Studi e di Notizie», Volume XXII, Anno XXV, Milano 1998.
- Raffaele Casciaro, La scultura lignea lombarda del Rinascimento, Milano, 2000, 64–68, 281–282.
- Angela Guglielmetti, Scultura lignea nella diocesi di Novara tra '400 e '500. Proposta per un catalogo, Novara 2000.
- Paolo Venturoli, Del Maino (ad vocem), Dizionario Biografico degli Italiani, XXXVIII, Roma 1990, 103–111.
