= Baldino da Surso =

Baldino Da Surso (died 1478) was an Italian late Gothic sculptor, son of Urbanino (died before 1464), a master woodcarver. He was born in Pavia and was active there and in Piedmont in the 15th century.

He is recorded as being active between 1449 and 1478. One of his sets of choir stalls, for Asti Cathedral and now in the Diocesan Museum, is signed in Latin which translates as "20 October 1477 Baldino da Surso made this work". A 1473 wooden nativity scene by him is now in the church of San Michele Maggiore in Pavia. The wooden crucifix in Santa Maria di Castello church in Alessandria is also by him.

== Bibliography ==
- (in Italian) Rossana Bossaglia. "BALDINO di Surso". Dizionario Biografico degli Italiani - Volume 5 (1963). Archived from the original on 23 August 2023.
