= Santa Maria della Pace, Milan =

Catholic church in Milan, Italy

Coordinates: 45°27′35″N 9°12′05″E

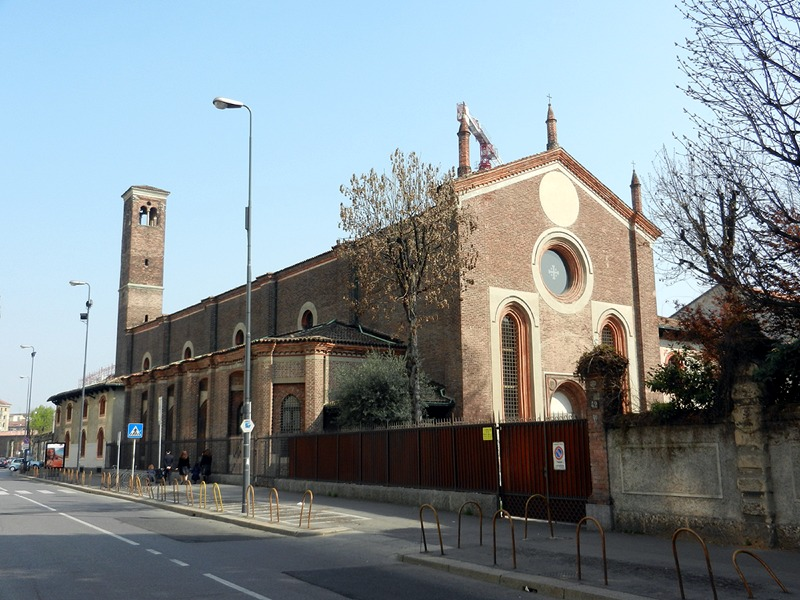
Milan - Church of S. Maria della Pace

The Chiesa di Santa Maria della Pace is a church in Milan, Italy. It was built in 1497.
