= Santa Maria delle Grazie, Vigevano =

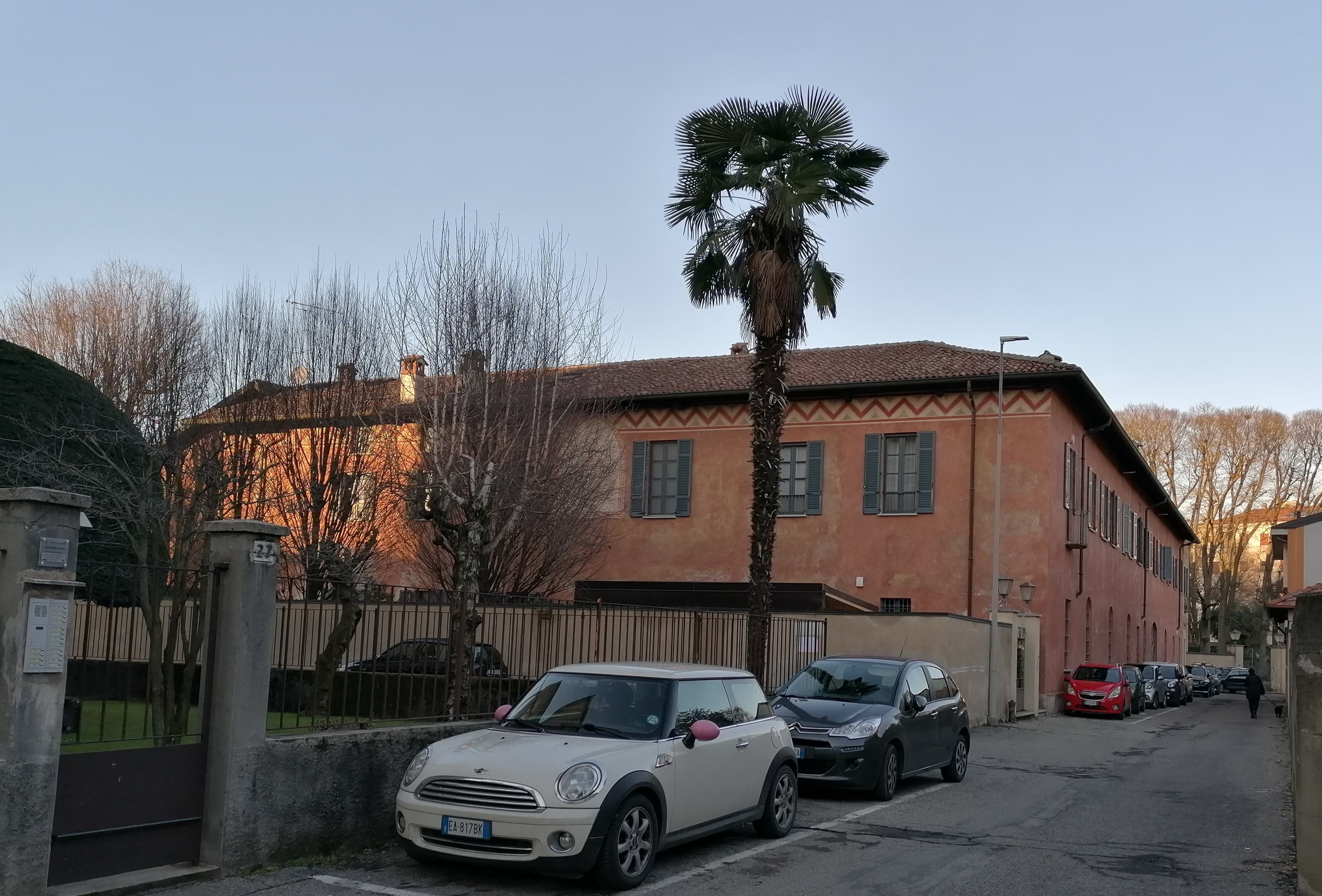
The convent.

The convent of Santa Maria delle Grazie hosted the community of observant minor friars of Vigevano.

== Description and history ==
The church and the convent were built between 1470 and 1475 to host the observant minor friars, along the road to Novara. The church was in Romanesque Franciscan style and took the shape of the church of the same name in Varallo. It had six chapels: the first dedicated to St. Bernardino or the Blessed Virgin (in which Cristoforo Macassoli from Milan, who died in the convent in 1485, was buried); the second in St. Firmus; the third to St. Francis; the fourth to St. Bonaventura; the fifth to St. Diego; the sixth to St. Anthony of Padua. The façade of the church was characterized by vague paintings. There was a painting of St. Ambrose and St. Bernardino.

The church was consecrated in 1578. In 1636 the Company of the Holy Sepulcher of Our Lord Jesus Christ was created here. Among the most important guests of this convent were Pacifico da Cerano, the aforementioned Macassoli, Bernardino Caimi and also Saint Bernardino of Siena, in Vigevano in 1431.

The church and convent were suppressed in 1805 and sold for 30,000 lire in 1810. A large part of the complex was demolished and the cloister was converted into private homes.
