= Giulio Cesare Luini =

Italian painter

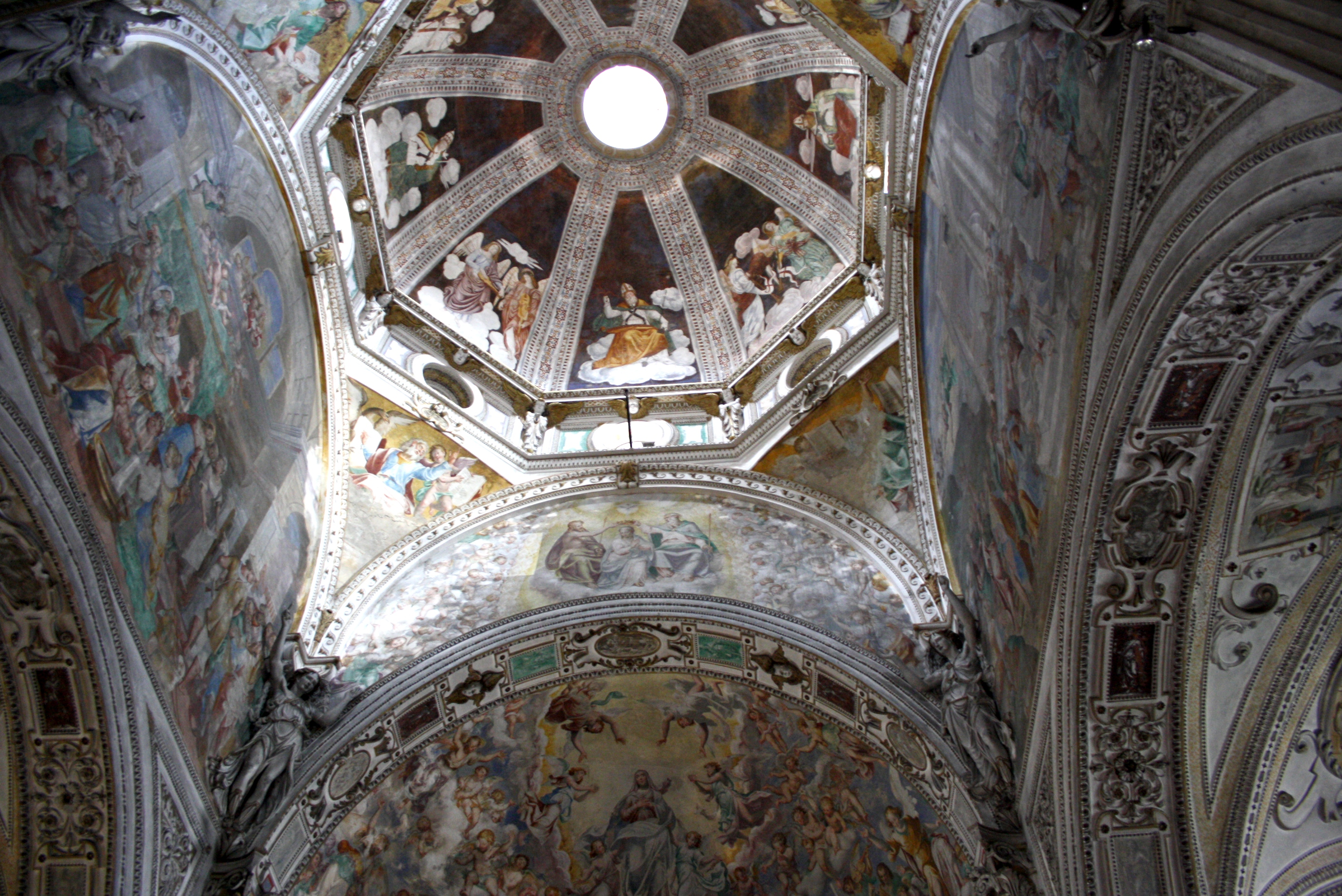

Giulio Cesare Luini (1512 in Varallo Sesia – After 1565) was an Italian painter. Giulio was a colleague of Gaudenzio Ferrari in the decoration of the Sacro Monte di Varallo.
