= Missionaries of Jesus the Eternal Priest =

L'Orologio Eucaristico – the distinctive symbol of the Spirituality of the Servant of God Mother Margherita Maria Guaini and the Missionaries of Jesus the Eternal Priest.

The Missionary of Jesus the Eternal Priest is a Roman Catholic religious order for women, founded by the Servant of God Mother Margherita Maria Guaini in May 1947, in Atella, Diocese of Melfi (Italy). The community moved to Varallo Sesia in the Province of Vercelli, where they were welcomed and supported by Mons. Gilla Vincenzo Gremigni, Bishop of Novara.

When this Institute (which is also known as Missionary Sisters of Jesus the Eternal Priest) flourished and matured through the years, it received the approval of the Diocese of Novara, on 29 April 1964. Later, on 8 December 1975, Pope Paul VI elevated the Institute to a religious congregation with Pontifical rights.

Mother Margherita Maria Guaini, its foundress and who is now a Servant of God, died in Varallo Sesia on 2 March 1994, at the age of 92 years, after spending her life for God and humankind, and with the commitment to continue being the "mother" of priests and those who suffer. Her remains are enshrined in the Church of Our Lady of Graces in the same place where she died. On 29 April 2011, Mons. Renato Corti, Bishop of Novara, opened the diocesan phase of the canonical procedure in view of examining her heroic virtue .

Today, the Institute of the Missionaries of Jesus the Eternal Priest, which she established, is present in Italy, Latin America, Philippines, and India.

== Mission and Apostolate ==
The Missionary Sisters of Jesus the Eternal Priest follow the spiritual path of their foundress as manifested in her zeal to serve Christ Priest and Victim, her deep attraction to prayer, her devotion to the Eucharist, and her love for the poor and suffering.

To this end, their Mission is defined by the following areas of apostolate:

1. Eucharistic adoration – to fulfill the priestly character of the Congregation by prayer for the Pope, for the Bishops, and for the Priests, and by supporting them in their work.

2. Liturgical Participation in the Mass, encouraging the faithful to participate also.

3. Service to the Priest, by helping them in their parish and pastoral work and by teaching in parochial schools.

4. Service to the poor.

5. Service to families and individuals.

== Link ==
Santi, Beati e testimoni
