= Margherita Maria Guaini =

Venerable Margherita Maria Guaini
- Mother Margherita Maria Guaini with Pope John Paul II.
- Born: 12 November 1902; Ceto, Val Camonica, Brescia, Italy
- Died: 2 March 1994 (aged 91); Varallo Sesia, Italy

Margherita Maria Guaini, Foundress of the Missionaries of Jesus the Eternal Priest, was born on 12 November 1902, in Ceto, Val Camonica in the Italian Province of Brescia. Her parents, Battista Guaini and Elisabetta Filippini, gave her the name Alice Antonia, when she was baptized on the same day that she was born.

When she was ten years old (in 1912), her family moved to Gozzolina, in the Municipality of Castiglione delle Stiviere, where she received her first communion two years later, on 21 June 1914, in the Parish of Sts. Nazario and Celso.

Since her youth, Antonietta (as she was fondly called by her family) showed deep attraction to prayer, devotion to the Eucharist, and love for the poor and suffering. She spent her adolescent years at the school of sacrifice and prayer, with simple and strong faith. trusting in Divine Providence, helping her mother educate and care her nine other younger siblings, while her father worked as a farmer.

When she was at the age of twenty years, she lost her mother. This left Antonietta to assist her father in taking care of all their family needs. She did so by working as a nurse in Castiglione and Mantua. Her devotion to the Blessed Virgin and her generous service to the sick and the poor drew her closer to Christ. Profoundly attracted to the Heart of Jesus, she opened her life to the action of divine grace and to the inspiration of the Holy Spirit, journeying with faith and courage along the path that God prepared for her. So, after having set her siblings in a decorous place, she surrendered herself totally to God.

Her spiritual journey started in the Institute of the Handmaids of Charity in Brescia, where she thread the arduous path by means of an apostolic life. Then, she deepened her search for perfection through silence, self-denial and total abandonment to God's will through an experience of contemplative life in the Monastery of the Visitation.

Through these spiritual experiences and discernment that moulded her in faith, little by little her vocation to serve Christ Priest and Victim unfolded before her eyes. In May 1947, she founded the Missionaries of Jesus the Eternal Priest. Six years after (on 12 September 1953), she and her community moved to Varallo Sesia in the Province of Vercelli, where they were welcomed and supported by Mons. Gilla Vincenzo Gremigni, Bishop of Novara.

When the Institute flourished and mature through the years, it received the approval of the Diocese of Novara, on 29 April 1964. Later, on 8 December 1975, Pope Paul VI elevated the Institute as a religious congregation with Pontifical rights.

After spending her life for God and humankind, and with the commitment to continue being the "mother" of priests and of those who suffer, she died in Varallo Sesia on 2 March 1994, at the age of 92 years. Her remains are enshrined in the Church of Our Lady of Graces in the same place where she died.

On 29 April 2011, Mons. Renato Corti, Bishop of Novara, opened the diocesan phase of the canonical procedure in view of examining the heroic virtue of Mother Margherita Maria Guaini, who is now a Servant of God.

Today, the Institute of the Missionaries of Jesus the Eternal Priest, which she established, is present in Italy, Latin America, Philippines, and India.
