= Puncetto Valsesiano =

Type of needle lace

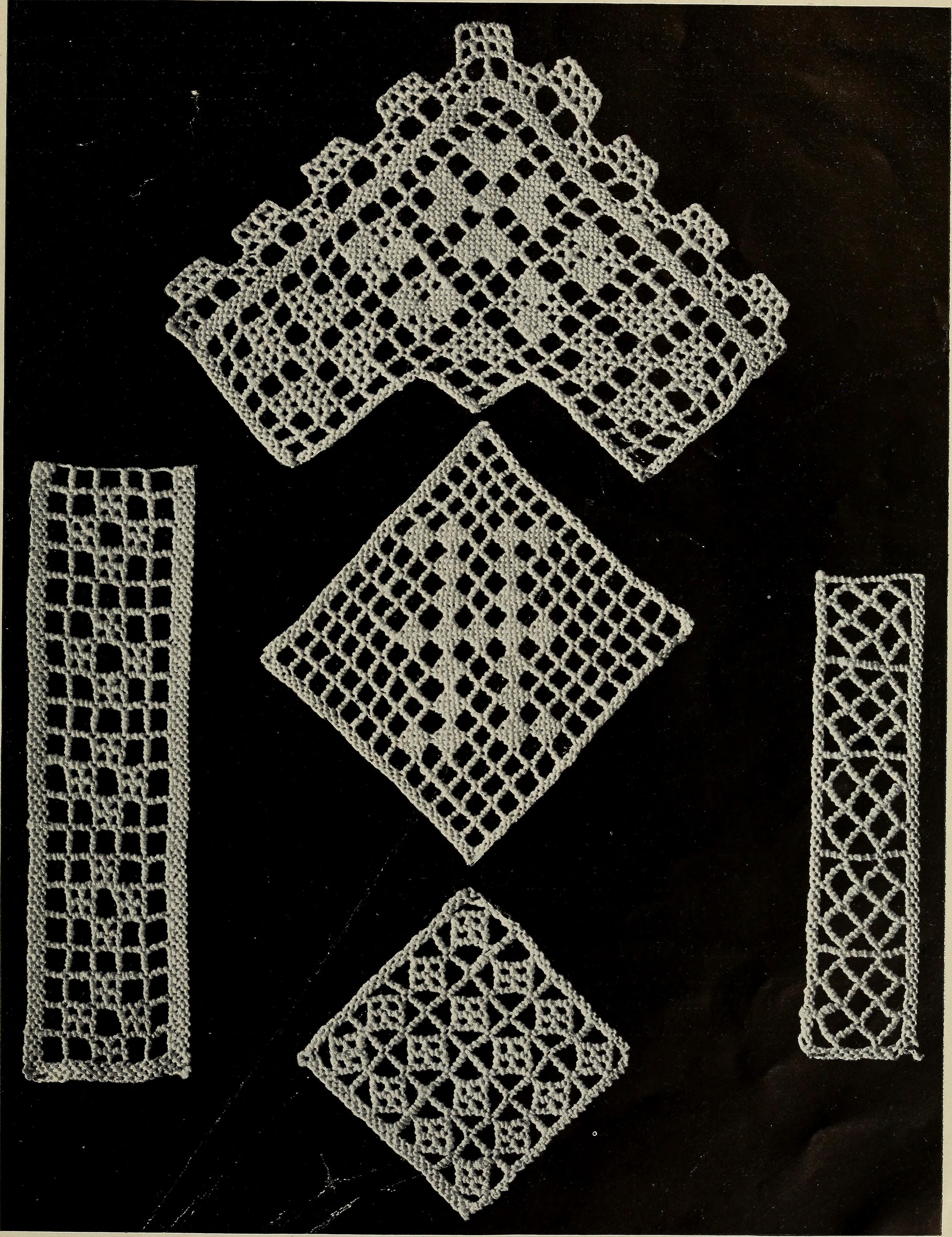
Photograph from Poncetto Lace: First Shown in the USA (1917)

Puncetto Valsesiano (also called puncetto della Valsesia, punto avorio or simply puncetto) is a type of needle lace originating in Valsesia, in the Piedmont region of Italy, and used for doilies and decorations on handkerchiefs and clothes. The alternative name punto avorio means 'ivory stitch', and is thought to refer to the smooth white appearance of a closely-worked lace. It is characterised by symmetrical geometric patterns, especially grids of squares.

== History ==
The first written reference to puncetto valsesiano, or perhaps a precursor to it, is in a deed from 1685 referring to a handkerchief trimmed with "ponchietto". A seventeenth-century statue of the Madonna in chapel no. 4 at Sacro Monte di Varallo portrays her making lace in what appears to be puncetto valsesiano style.

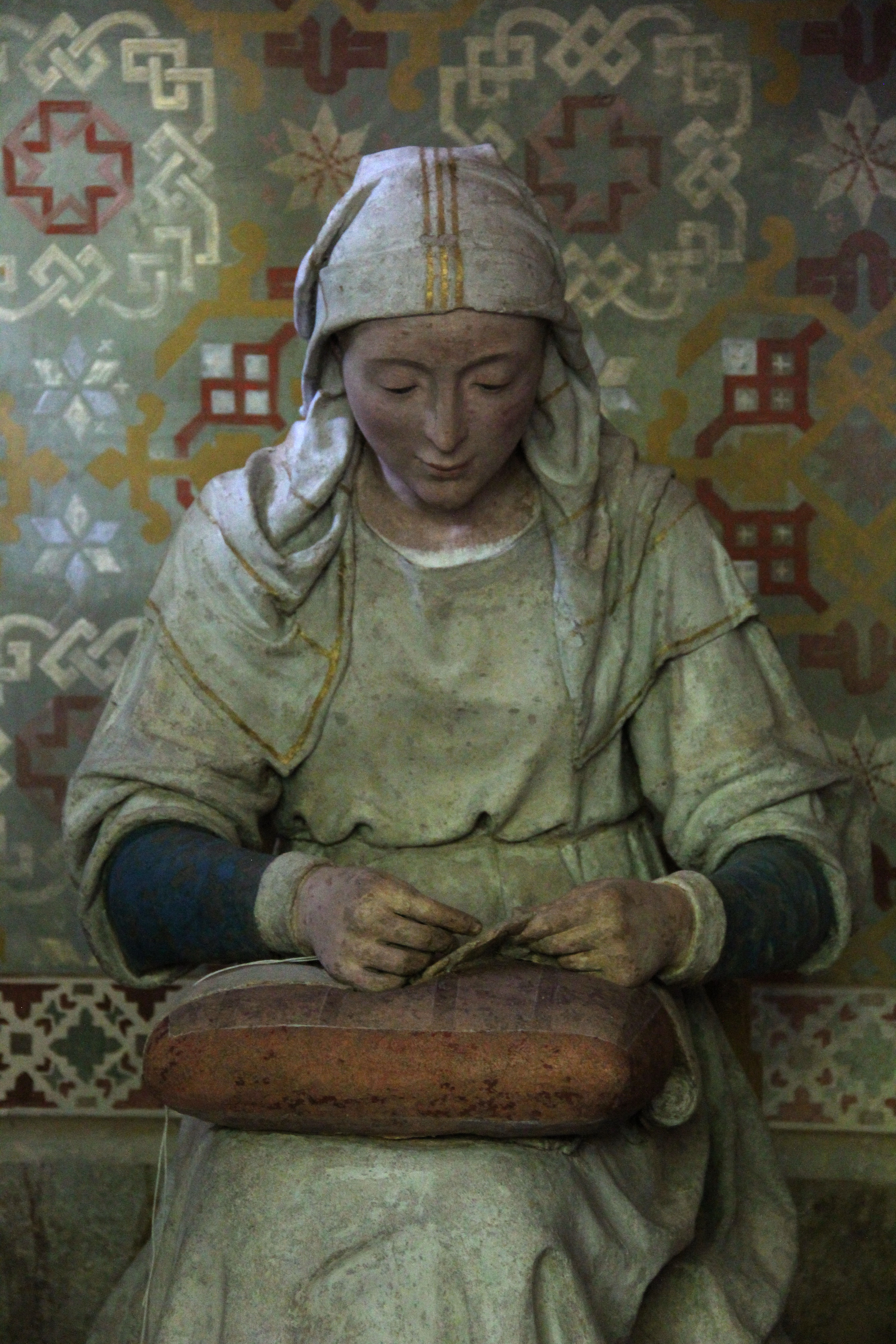
Statue of the Madonna shown making lace at Sacro Monte di Varallo

== Technique ==
Puncetto Valsesiano is worked forwards and backwards on the right side of the work only, usually from bottom to top. It can be made as a standalone piece, or used as an edging for an existing fabric item.

Contemporary lacemakers can reproduce historical patterns with diagrams and instructions.

== See also ==
- Rizzi, Theresa (1917). Poncetto Lace: Shown for the First time in U.S.A. Valsesia: Theresa Rizzi. Digitised by the Smithsonian Library.
- "Puncetto della Valsesia" listing on the Inventory of Intangible Patrimony of the Alpine Region (in Italian).
