= Giacomo Paracca =

Italian sculptor

Giacomo Paracca was a 17th-century sculptor active in the Sacro Monte di Varallo. Around the year 1600, he completed the sculptural group depicting Massacre of the Innocents. He is also known as Giacomo Bargnola, or Bergnola, Paracca di Valsolda, or simply il Bergnola.
