= Varallo Sesia railway station =

Railway station in Italy

Varallo Sesia
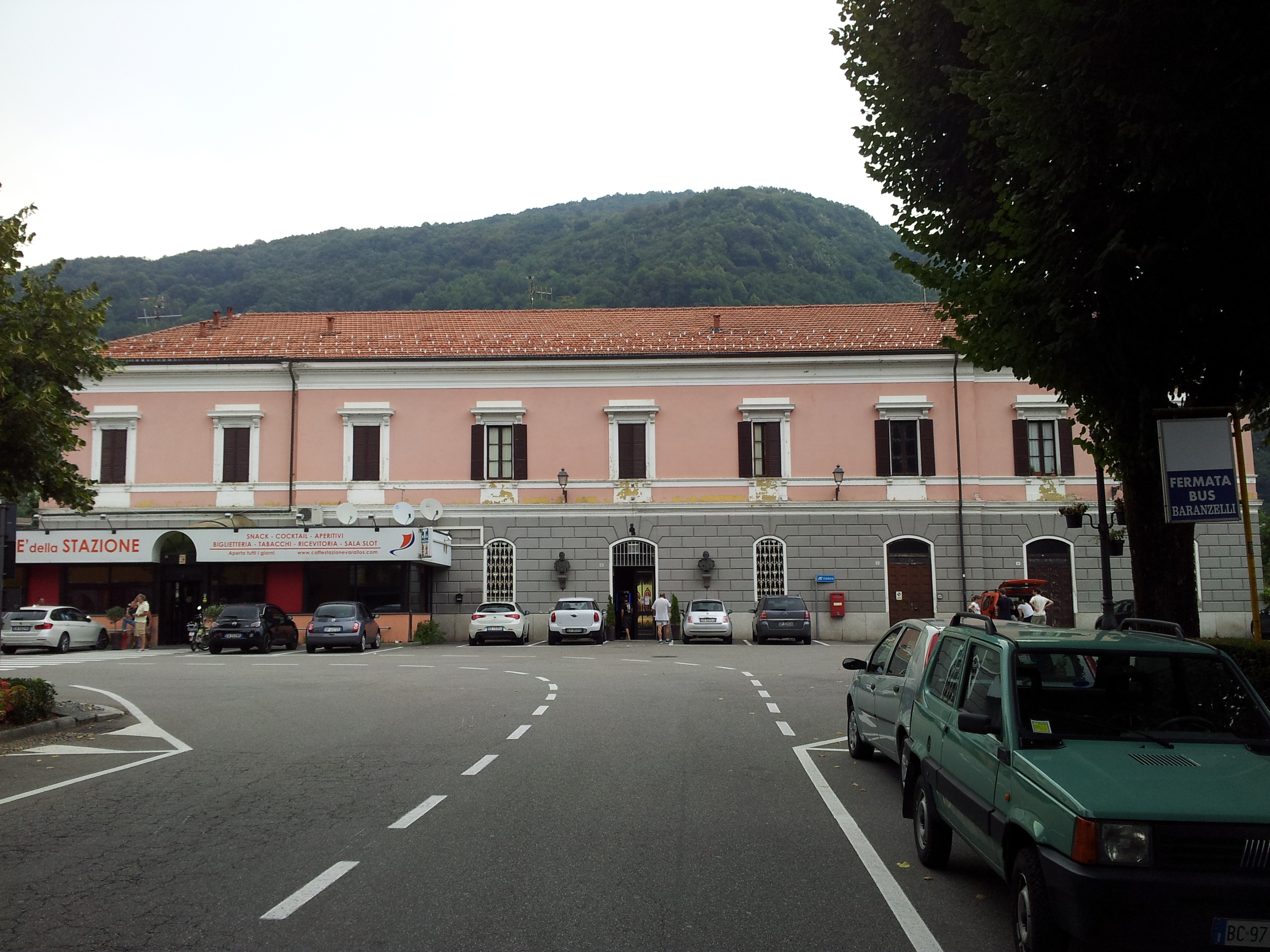
- The passenger building.

General information
- Location: Piazza Marconi, 9; 13019 Varallo Sesia VC; Varallo Sesia, Vercelli, Piedmont; Italy
- Coordinates: 45°48′51″N 08°15′33″E
- Operator: Rete Ferroviaria Italiana
- Line: Novara–Varallo
- Distance: 54.095 km (33.613 mi) from Novara
- Platforms: 2
- Train operators: Trenitalia
- Connections: Suburban buses; Cableway

Other information
- Classification: Bronze

History
- Opened: 12 April 1886; 140 years ago
Location
- Location within Piedmont Location within Northern Italy Location within Italy

Varallo Sesia railway station (Italian: Stazione di Varallo Sesia) is the train station serving the comune of Varallo Sesia, in the Piedmont region, northwestern Italy. It is the junction terminus of the Novara–Varallo.

The station is currently managed by Rete Ferroviaria Italiana (RFI). However, the passenger building is managed by comune. The station is served only by historic trains, in the service of tourism on planned dates. The ordinary passengers service has been suspended on 15 September 2014 by decision of the Piedmont Region. Train services are operated by Fondazione FS and Trenitalia. Each of these companies is a subsidiary of Ferrovie dello Stato (FS), Italy's state-owned rail company.

== History ==
The station was opened on 12 April 1886, upon the inauguration the fourth-last part of the Novara–Varallo railway, from Borgosesia to Varallo Sesia.

== Features ==
Two tracks of which are equipped with platforms.

== Train services ==
The station is served by the following services:

- Historic train (Treno storico) Novara - Varallo Sesia

== See also ==
- History of rail transport in Italy
- List of railway stations in Piedmont
- Rail transport in Italy
- Railway stations in Italy
