= Santa Maria delle Grazie, Varallo =

Roman Catholic church in Piedmont, Italy

Coordinates: 45°49′03″N 8°15′09″E

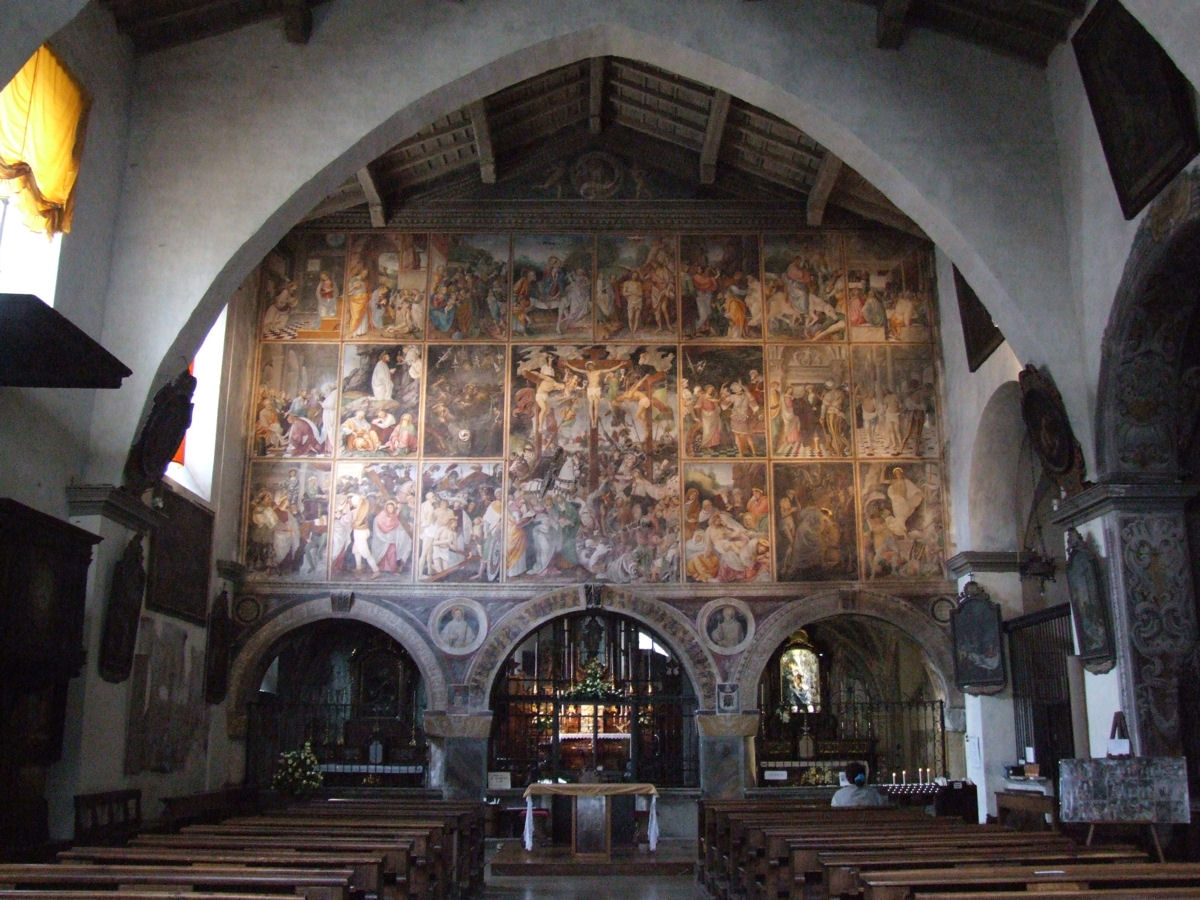
The inside of the church

The Church of Our Lady of the Graces (Italian: Santa Maria delle Grazie) is a Gothic-style, Roman Catholic church in Varallo Sesia, province of Vercelli, region of Piedmont, Italy. The church was built, together with the adjacent Franciscan convent, by padre Bernardo Caimi between 1486 and 1493. At this time, the construction of the Sacro Monte was also beginning. In December 1931, Pope Pius XI gave the church the title of Minor Basilica.

== History ==
The interior is subdivided into spaces for the general public and for the friars, separated by a partition wall (tramezzo), supported by three round arches. The central arch opens to a hall reserved for friars, while the two lateral arches lead to two chapels. The fresco cycle scheme of the wall is traditionally attributed to Bernardino of Siena, and painted in 1531 by Gaudenzio Ferrari.

Similar decorative structures, with a partition wall entirely decorated with frescoes of the life of Jesus, were typical of the religious and artistic culture of the Friars Minor in Piedmont and Lombardy between the 15th and 16th centuries.

By the end of the 15th century, the Franciscan convent was much larger than today. The ancient building consisted of two cloisters, the friars' cells, a refectory, a library and kitchens. The monks vacated the convent by the early 20th century, and restorations began. Since 1953 the complex has hosted the nuns Suore Missionarie di Gesù Eterno Sacerdote.

== Gaudenzio Ferrari's wall ==
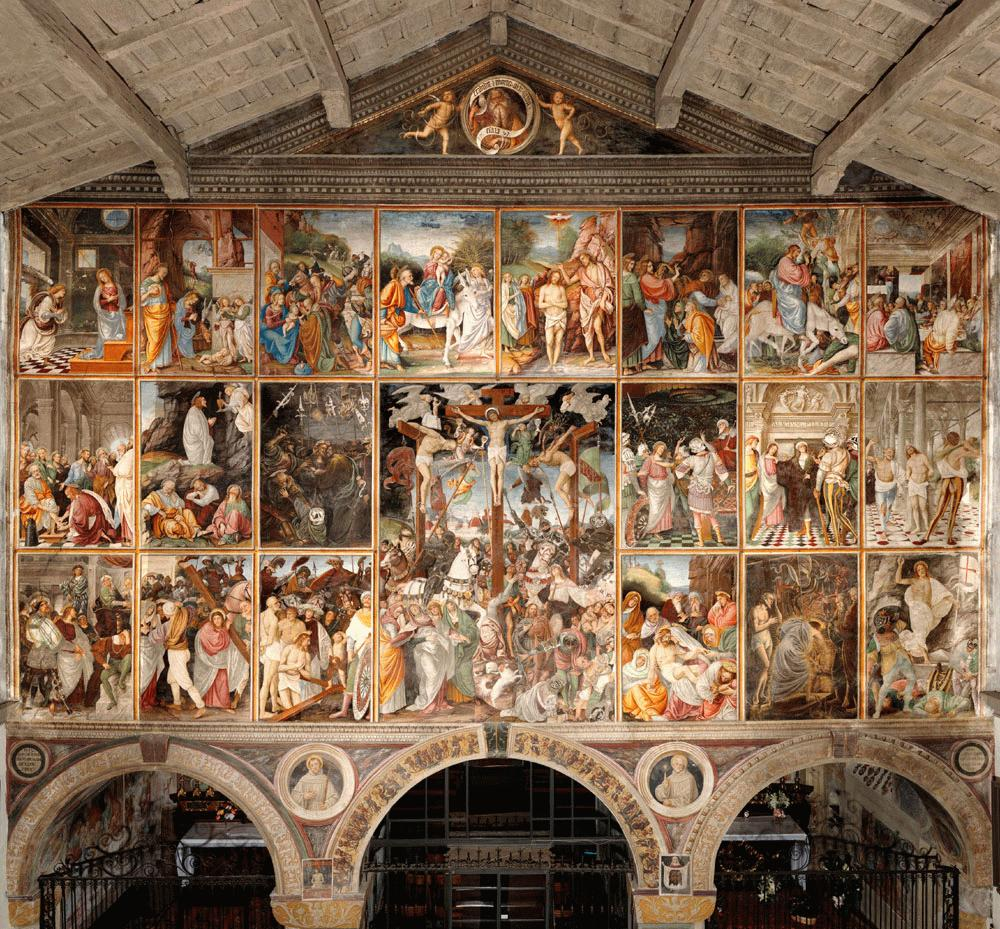
"Gaudenzio Ferrari's wall" in Santa Maria delle Grazie, Varallo The scenes: Annunciation, Nativity of Jesus, Adoration of the Magi, Flight into Egypt, Baptism of Jesus, Resurrection of Lazarus, Jesus enters in Jerusalem, Last Supper, Foot washing, Agony in the Gethsemani, Arrest of Jesus, Jesus at Herod's court, Pilate's court, Flagellation of Christ, Pilate washes his hands, Via dolorosa, Preparation of the cross, Lamentation of Christ, Descent in the Limbo, Resurrection of Jesus; in the centre Crucifixion of Jesus; medallions with paintings of Francis of Assisi and Bernardino of Siena

Common for Franciscan churches, the bare façade does not hint at the rich fresco decoration inside. In the cosy atmosphere of the church, with the gothic arches sustaining the ceiling trusses, the wall of frescos by Gaudenzio Ferrari are one of the masterpieces of Renaissance painting in Piedmont and Lombardy. They depict the life and passion of Jesus Christ on a surface of 82 m^{2} (880 sq ft): twenty equal frames narrate the main facts told by the gospels from the Annunciation to the Resurrection, working as Biblia pauperum. The Crucifixion, as the most important narrative scene, occupies the center with four frames.

The painter from Valsesia completed the frescos in 1513 (as it is written on the wall by the author himself, "Gaudenzius Ferrarius Vallis Siccidae pinxit"). He had worked in Varallo, at the Sacro Monte, for ten years and had already painted the polyptych of St Anne.

Ferrari's influences, for example in his orientation of the Last Supper include da Vinci's famous fresco in Milan. Ferrari's landscapes also recall Leonardo's style. But Ferrari had traveled to Rome, and met or saw the work of Bramantino in Milan or Perugino in Rome.

The most important model was Giovanni Martino Spanzotti, author of a similar decoration in the church of San Bernardino in Ivrea. The nocturnal Arrest of Jesus quotes from the same scene in Ivrea.

Despite the importance of his models, Ferrari also painted some figures (such as armors, horse heads, halos) in relief to give them particular prominence; an innovation perhaps prompted by the three dimensional tableaux of the Sacro Monte chapels.

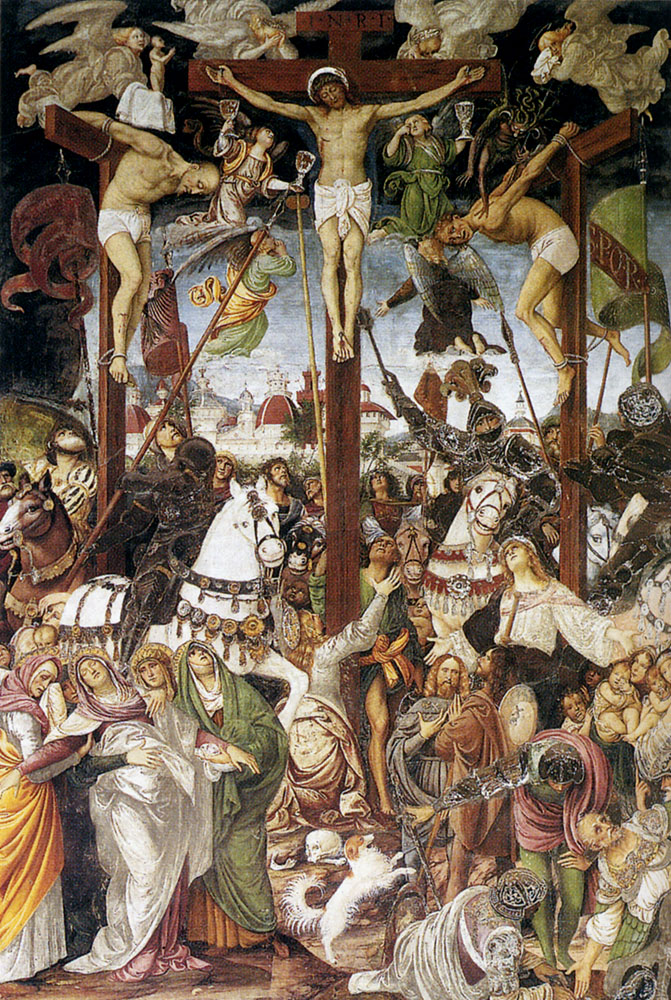
Central panel of the Crucifixion by Gaudenzio Ferrari

== Other artworks in the church ==
Despite the focus on Ferrari's wall, there are other important artworks in the church as well.

The two chapels under the partition wall preserve other frescos by Ferrari, who painted here before the wall. These frescos are important to understand his artistic development. The Saint Margaret chapel was painted in 1507 with two evangelical scenes (Presentation at the Temple and the Debate with the Doctors) and the grotesque.

On the right is the Graces chapel with frescos, dating back to 1491, from the studio of the Milanese painter Giovanni Scotto, where Ferrari was an apprentice. The paintings represent the birth of Virgin Mary, the marriage of Virgin Mary and the adoration of the Magi. The chapel also preserve the wooden statue of the Virgin with baby Jesus standing on her knees, very dear to the local devotees.

In the aisle is a fresco on the left wall, near the pulpit, by Fermo Stella, Ferrari's apprentice, who worked with his maestro at the Sacro Monte. The painting represents a rare scene, Jesus bidding his Mother farewell, inspired by a homily by John Chrysostom.

== Gallery ==
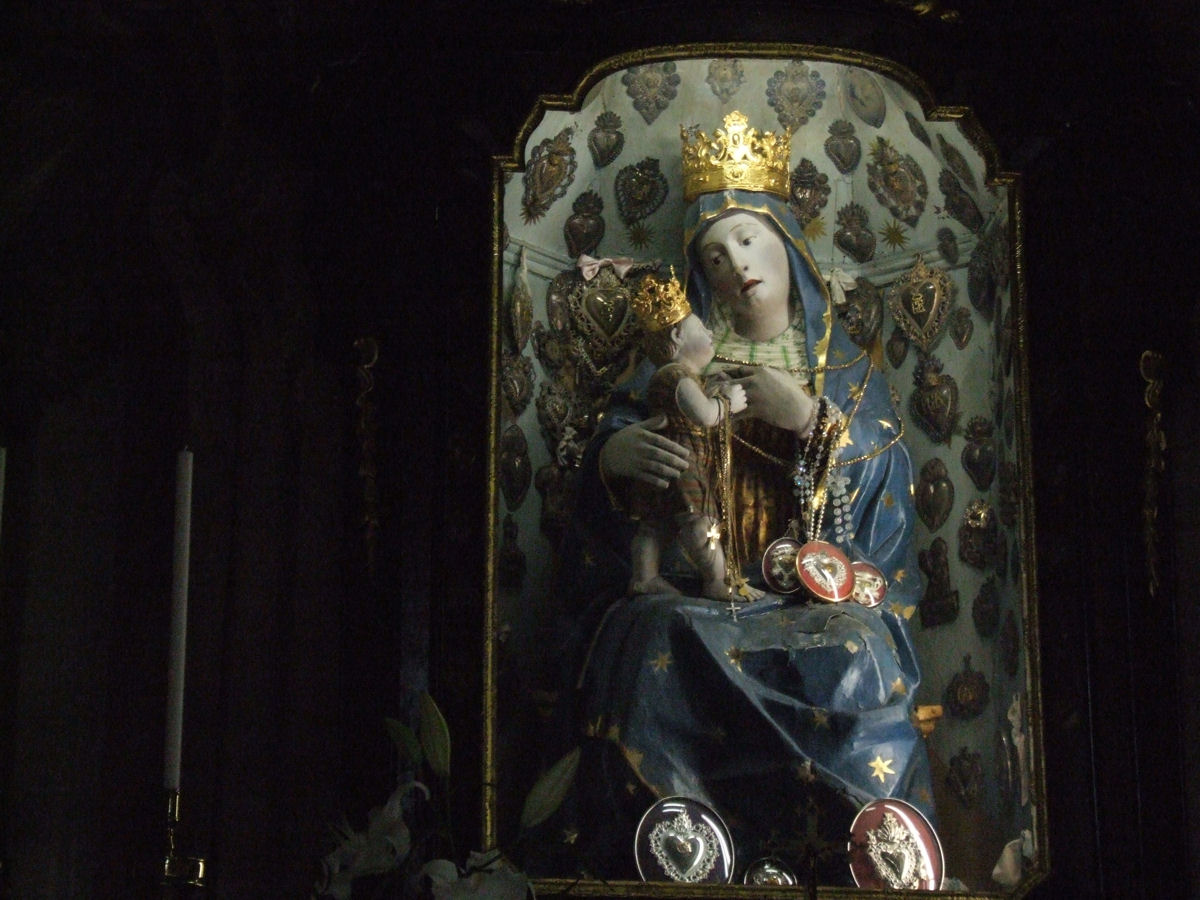
Wooden statue of the Virgin with baby Jesus standing on her knees

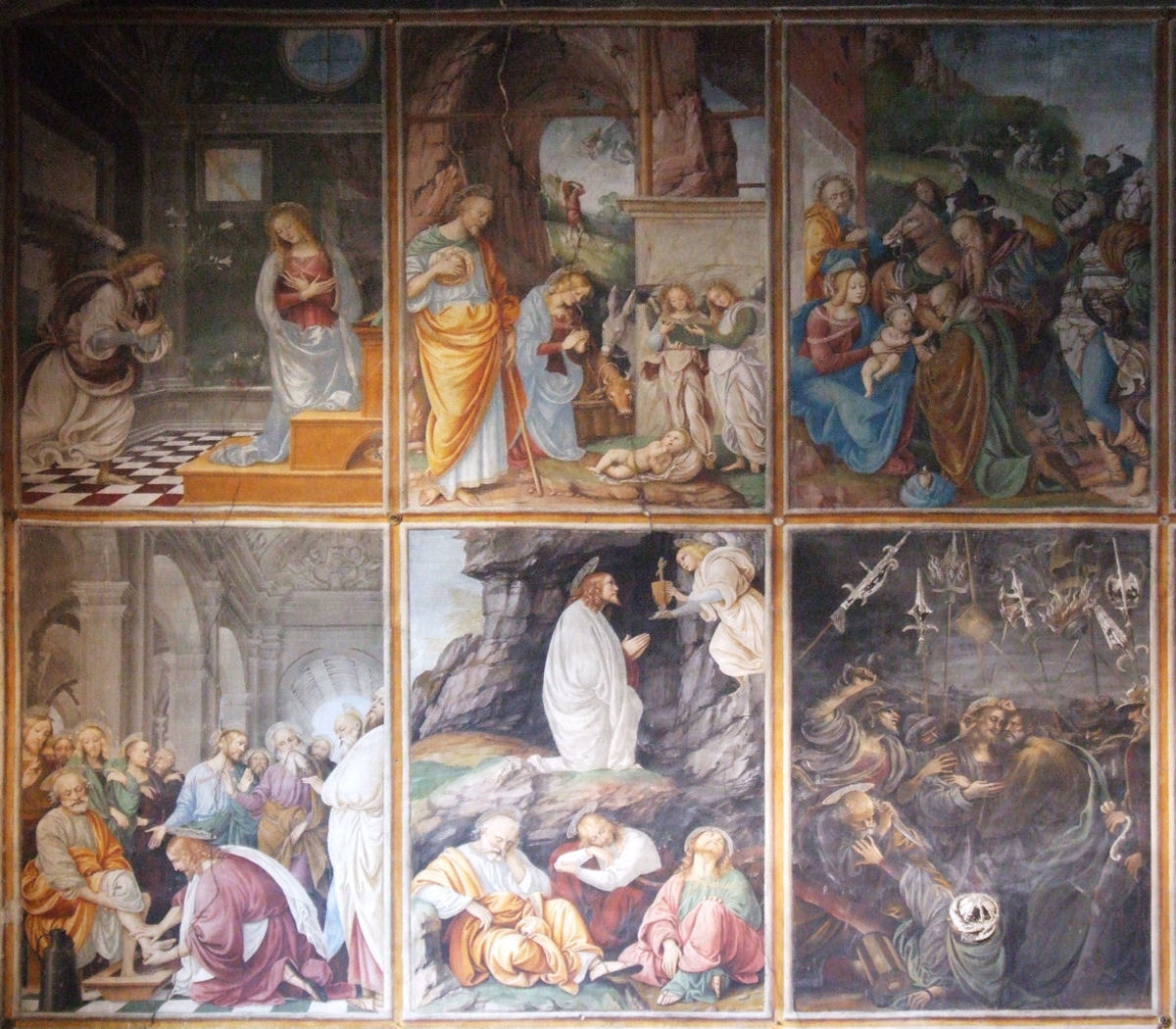
Ferrari fresco panels from the Life and Passion of Jesus Christ

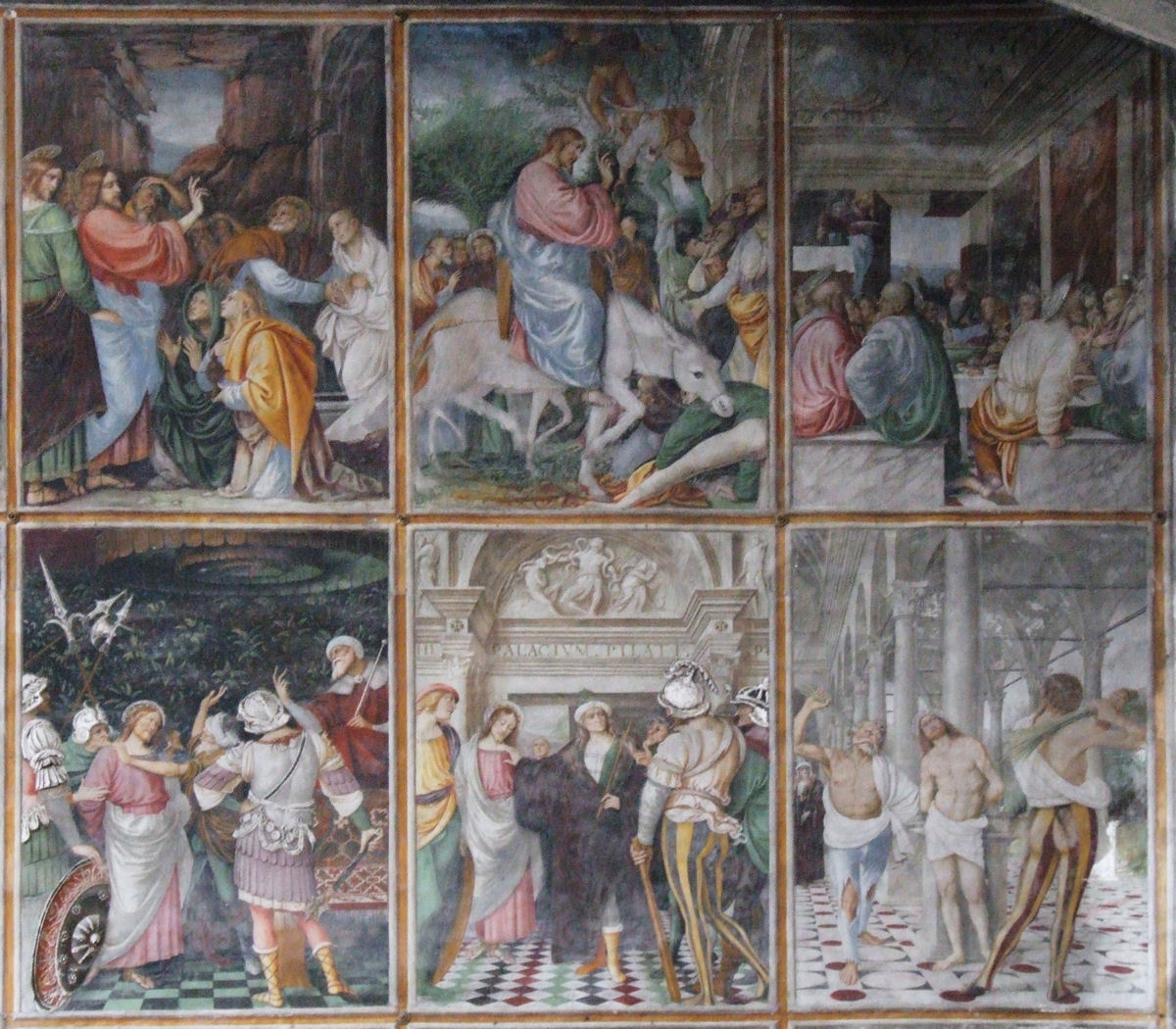
Ferrari fresco panels from the Life and Passion of Jesus Christ

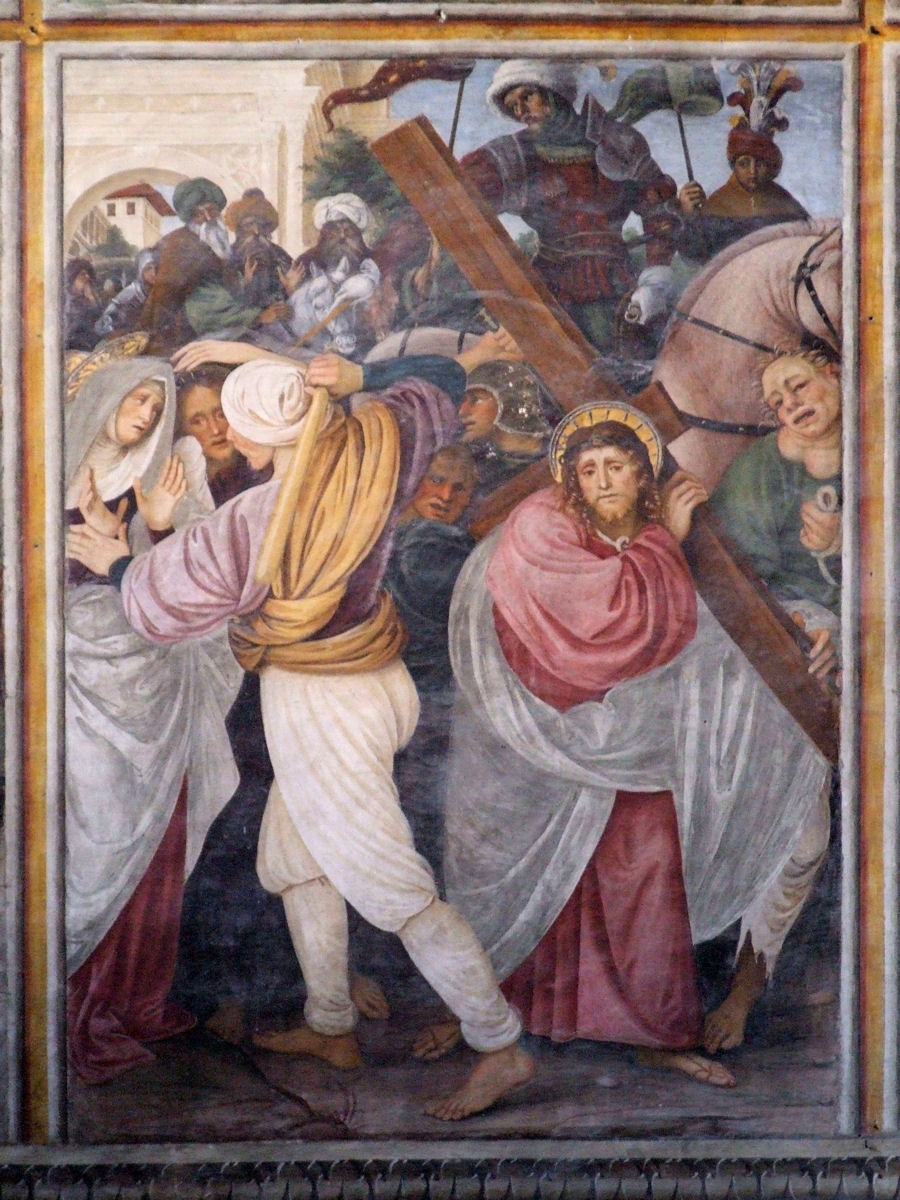
Ferrari fresco panel:Via Dolorosa

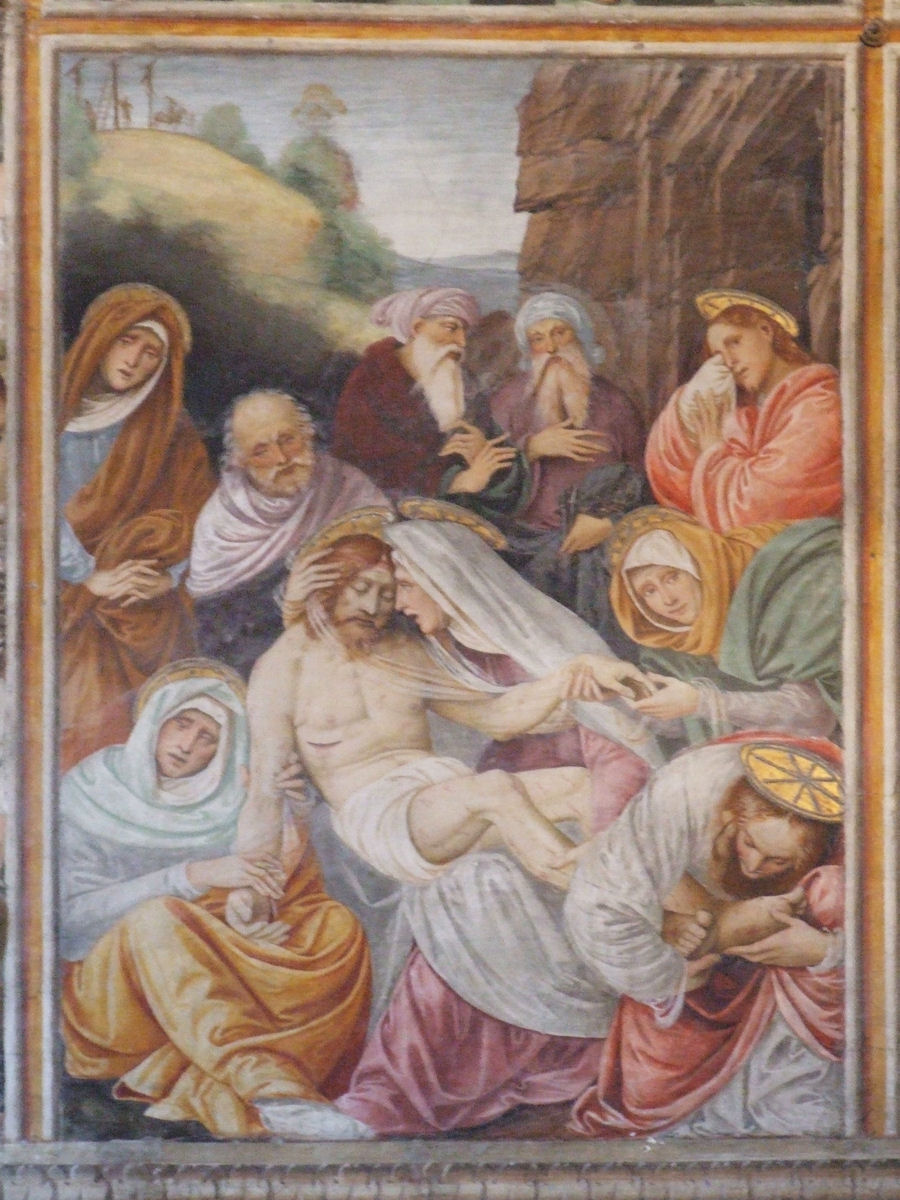
Ferrari fresco panel:Lamentation of Christ

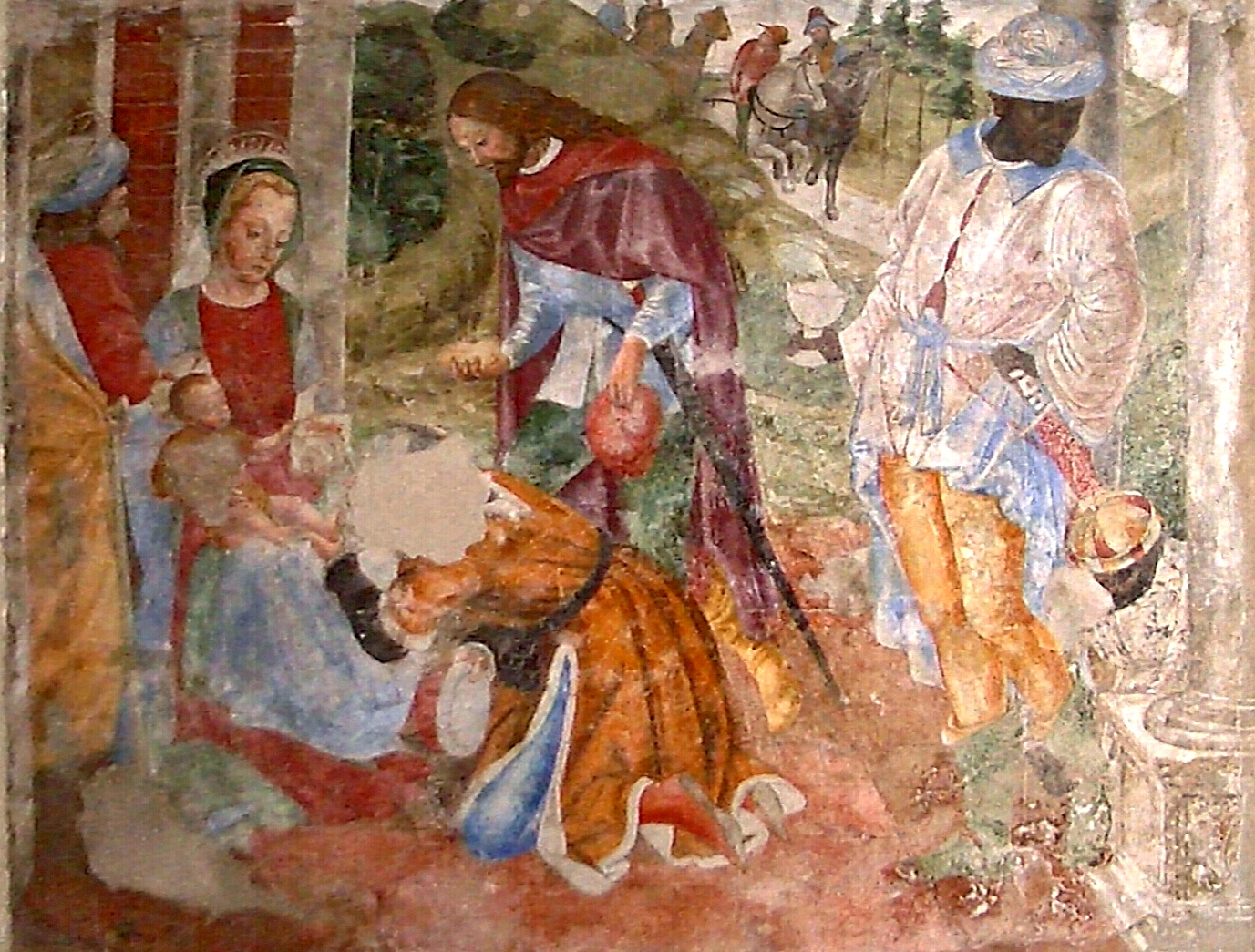
Giovanni Scotto's studio, Adoration of the Magi, fresco, ca 1491

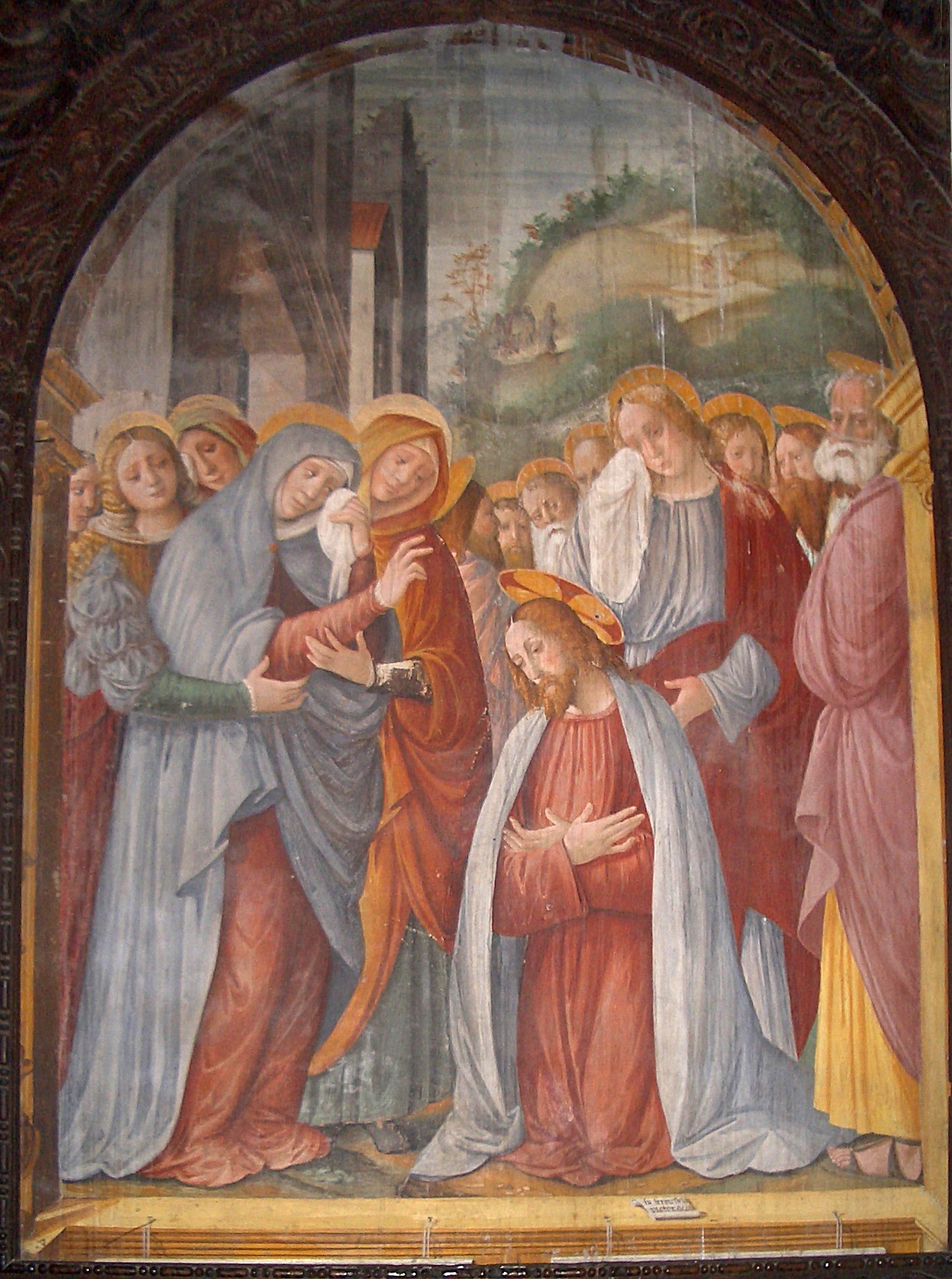
Fermo Stella, Jesus bidding his Mother farewell, fresco

== Bibliography ==
- Alberto Bossi, La Chiesa di Santa Maria delle Grazie e la grande Parete Gaudenziana di Varallo, Tipografia di Borgosesia;
- Giovanni Testori, Promemoria gaudenziano, in "Bollettino della Soc. Storica Piemontese d'Archeologia e Belle Art", VIII-IX, 1954–57;
- Vittorio Viale, G. Ferrari, Ed. ERI, Turin, 1969;
- Edoardo Villata, Simone Baiocco Gaudenzio Ferrari, Gerolamo Giovenone: un avvio e un percorso, Allemandi & C., Turin, 2004

== See also ==
- Sacro Monte di Varallo
- CoEur - In the heart of European paths
- Path of Saint Charles
