= Sacro Monte di Varallo =

Christian devotional complex in Varallo Sesia, Piedmont, Italy

Coordinates: 45°49′07″N 8°15′17″E

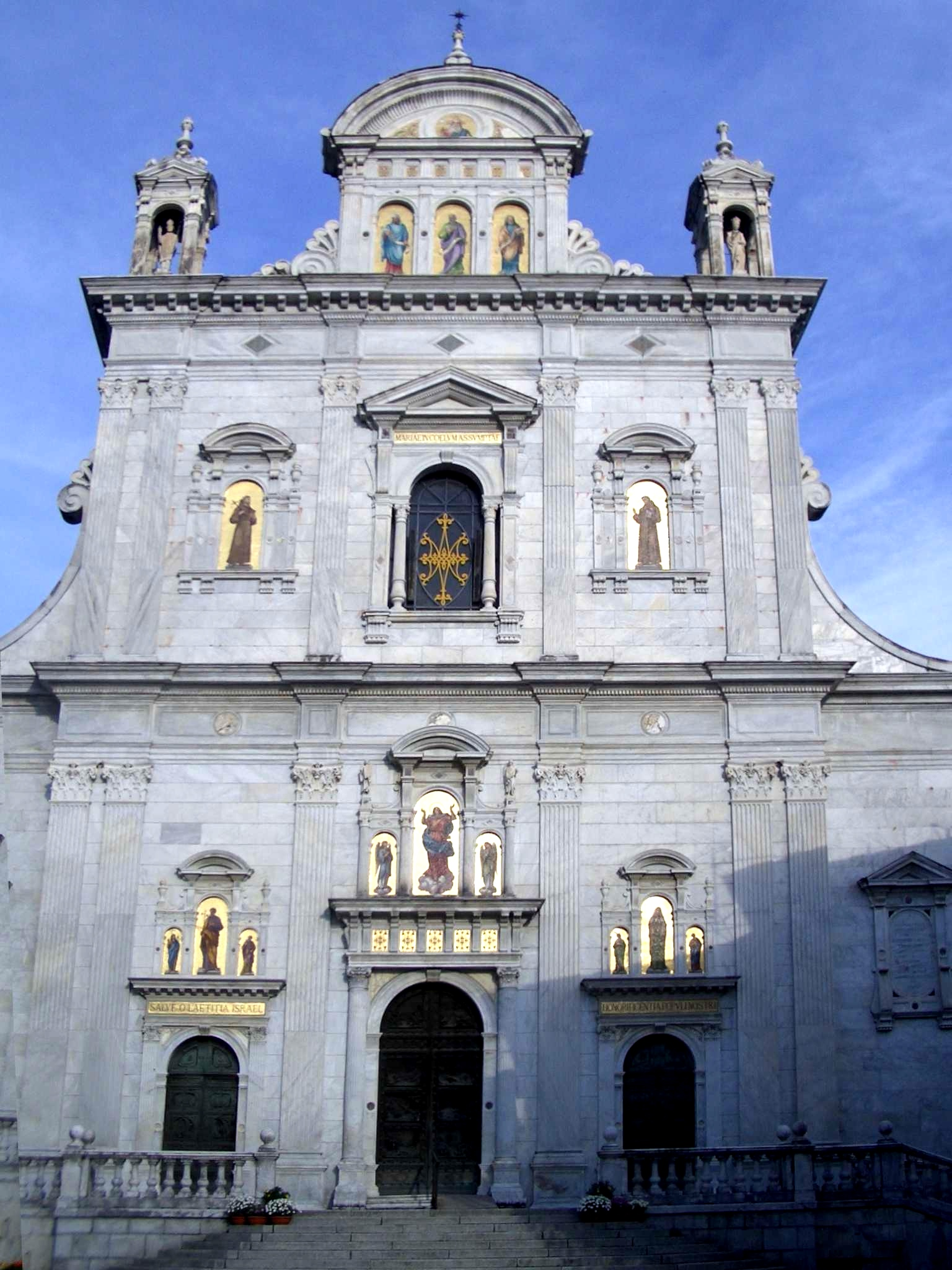
Façade of the basilica

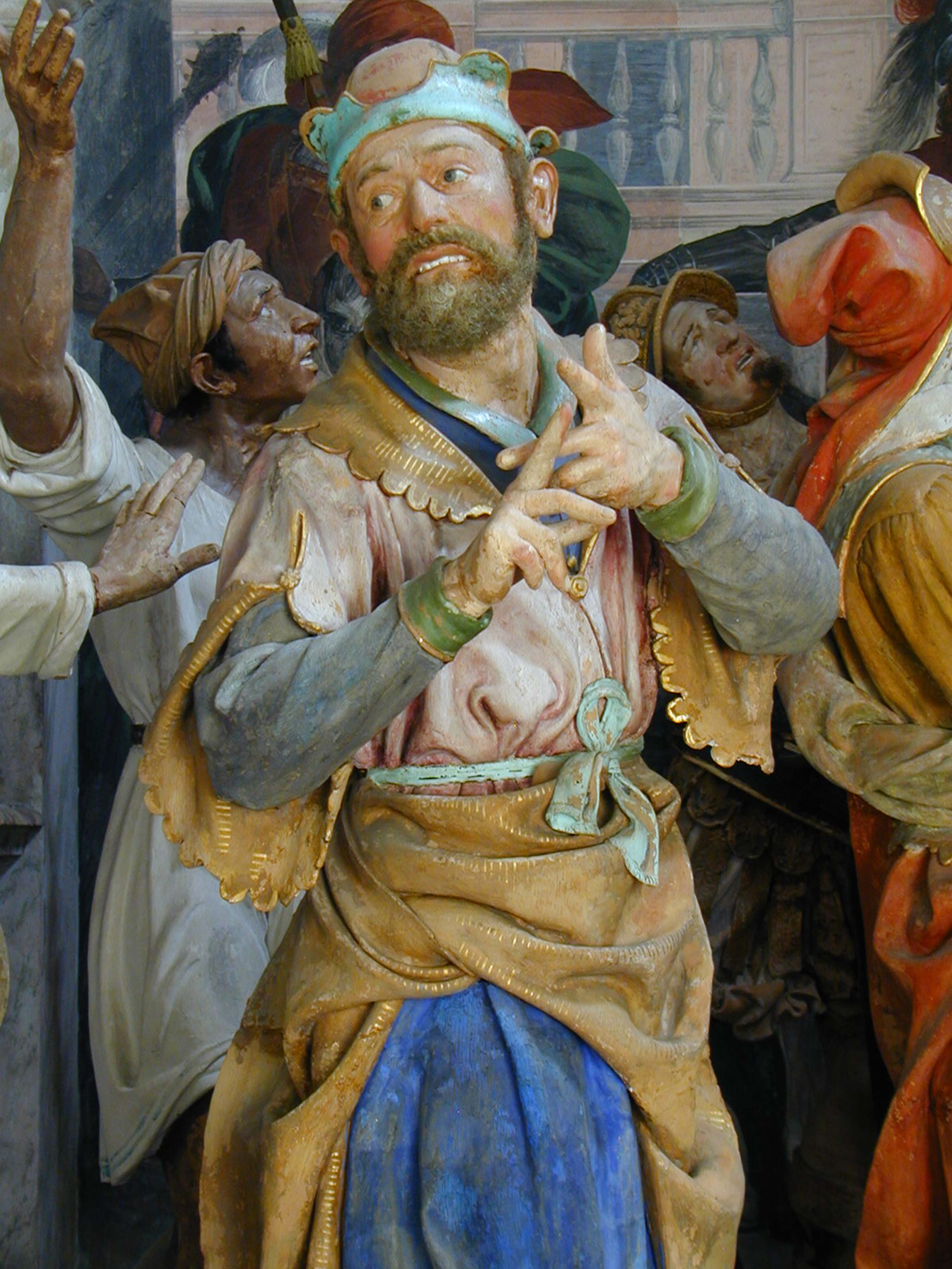
Giovanni d' Enrico, Ecce Homo (detail of the crowd calling for crucifixion), 1608–9

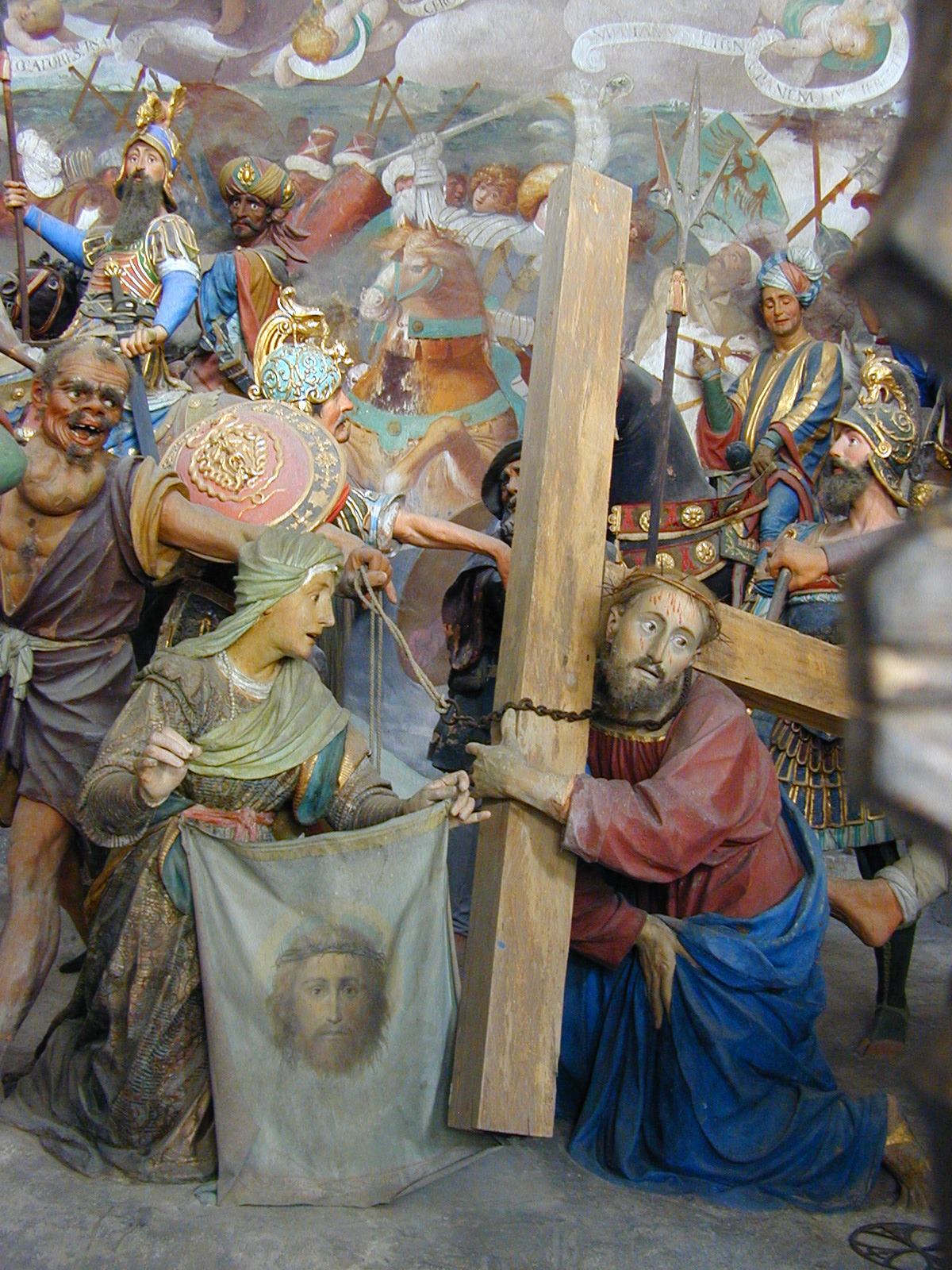
Tabacchetti and Giovanni d'Enrico, Christ on the Road to Calvary, 1599–1600

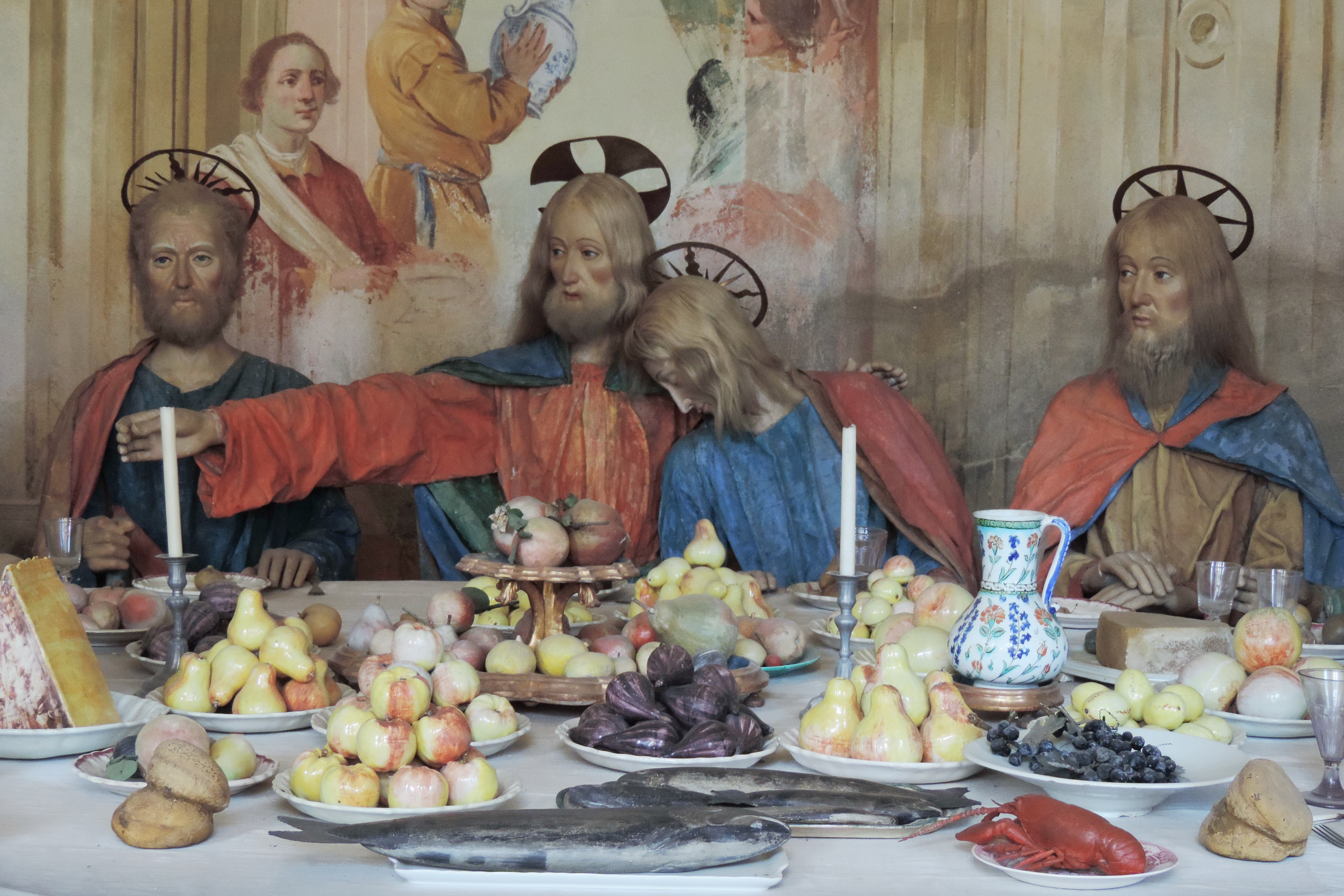
Unknown Master, Last Supper (detail); wood statues, ca. 1500–1505

The Sacred Mountain of Varallo (Italian: Sacro Monte di Varallo) is a Sacro Monte ("sacred mountain", a type of mountainside Christian devotional complex) overlooking the town of Varallo Sesia in the province of Vercelli, Piedmont, northern Italy. It is the oldest Sacro Monte, founded in 1491 by Franciscan friar Bernardino Caimi. It is built on a natural terrace on the rocky slopes of Monte Tre Croci ("three crosses mountain"), on the left bank of the Sesia river where it leaves Val Mastallone. It is 600 m above sea level, 150 m above the historic centre of Varallo. It is one of the nine Sacri Monti of Piedmont and Lombardy, included in the UNESCO World Heritage list.

== Structures ==
The Sacro Monte at Varallo comprises the minor basilica and 45 chapels, either isolated or inserted into the large monumental complexes Nazareth, Bethlehem, Pilate’s house, Calvary, Sepulchre and Parella’s house – populated by more than 800 life size painted statues, in wood and terracotta, that dramatically illustrate the life, passion, death and resurrection of Christ. These interiors are vividly decorated with fresco paintings.

The Sacro Monte area is divided into two distinct zones. The first, surrounded by plants, is set out like a sloping garden; here the chapels are positioned at strategic points along the path. Beginning with Adam and Eve or Original Sin, they narrate the story of Christ, from the Annunciation until his arrival in Bethlehem. The second zone, preceded by the Porta Aurea, is located on the summit, and is built up of palazzi and elaborate porticos, built around the two squares; piazza dei Tribunali (piazza civica) and piazza del Tempio (piazza religiosa). The aim here, was to represent the city of Jerusalem; it does indeed have a city feel about it. The chapels narrate the events of Christ's life inside and around the walls of Jerusalem; here are The Last Supper, The Burial, The Resurrection of Christ and The Assumption of the Madonna, to which the basilica is also dedicated. The urban character of this Sacro Monte clearly distinguishes it from the others.

== History ==
The present layout of the Sacro Monte is the result of a series of interventions carried out from the very end of the 15th century up until the middle of the 19th century.

Father Bernardino Caimi, an eminent political and religious man, was the promoter of the Sacro Monte, with the help of rich local families. He had been rector of the Palestinian Holy Places, and an Ambassador to the Spanish court. A plaque tells us that Caimi tried to recreate the “Holy sites, so that who could not go on a pilgrimage might see Jerusalem”. After his death in 1499, father Candido Ranzo and father Francesco da Marignano, continued his work. Helped by Gaudenzio Ferrari from Valduggia (a key figure until 1529 – painter, sculptor and architect), creator of some of the most enthralling of the sacred dramas: The Three Kings and The Crucifixion. The Lanino brothers Giulio Cesare Luini and Fermo Stella da Caravaggio were the executors of his work.

From the middle of the sixteenth-century work began on a total renovation of the site. At the height of the Counter-Reformation, all the events of Jesus’s life were to be represented, the passion and his death. The area was organized into two zones, the predominantly natural lower portion and the summit, destined to represent the City of Jerusalem. From 1570 to 1590 a substantial number of the chapels in the garden area were constructed, the frescoes were finished and the statues were added. From 1593 until 1640, the organization of the urbanistic, architectural and figurative elements was carried out in the elevated zone. The configuration of the Sacro Monte was taking place; the cardinal points of the first scenes - Nazareth, Bethlehem, Crucifixion and The Burial - were established in the new layout.

From 1565 until 1569 the architect Galeazzo Alessi played a decisive role in the renovation work, as did the Perugian architect Domenico Alfiano, and Valsesians Giovanni d’Enrico and Bartolomeo Ravelli. The sculptors, Tabacchetti, Giovanni D’Enrico, and painters like il Morazzone, Tanzio, Rocca, the Gherardini brothers, and the Gianoli brothers worked in the same artistic vein established by Gaudenzio Ferrari. However, Morazzone and the d’Enrico brothers, Giovanni and Antonio (known as "Tanzio"), helped concretize the gran teatro montano. Giacomo Paracca completed the sculptural group depicting Massacre of the Innocents circa 1600.

== See also ==
- Stations of the Cross
- Poor Man's Bible
- Santa Maria delle Grazie
- The sacromonti are part of the historic-devotional hiking and biking Path of Saint Charles, part of CoEur European paths

== Bibliography ==
- Samuel Butler, Ex Voto. Studio artistico sulle opere d'arte del Sacro Monte di Varallo e di Crea, Novara, 1894 (traduzione italiana del testo inglese reperibile on line).
- Giovanni Testori, Elogio dell'arte novarese, De Agostini, Novara, 1962.
- Idem, Il gran teatro montano, Milano, Feltrinelli, 1965 (ora in G. Testori, La realtà della pittura. Scritti di storia e critica d'arte dal Quattrocento al Settecento, a cura di P. Marani, Milano, Longanesi, 1995.
- Idemi, Tanzio da Varallo, catalogo della mostra, Torino, 1959 (ora in G. Testori, La realtà della Pittura, Longanesi, Milano, 1995.
- Casimiro Debiaggi, Il Sacro Monte di Varallo - Breve storia della Basilica e di tutte le cappelle, Guida a cura dell'Amministrazione Vescovile del Sacromonte, III edizione, 1996.
- Luigi Zanzi, Paolo Zanzi, (a cura di), Atlante dei Sacri Monti prealpini, Skira, Milano, 2002.
- Giovanni Agosti, Testori a Varallo, in "Testori a Varallo - Sacro Monte, Santa Maria delle Grazie, Pinacoteca e Roccapietra" (a cura dell'Associazione Giovanni Testori), Cinisello Balsamo, Silvana Editoriale, 2005.
- Elena De Filippis, Gaudenzio Ferrari. La crocefissione del Sacro Monte di Varallo, Torino, Allemandi, 2006.
- Giovanni Reale, Elisabetta Sgarbi, Il grande teatro del Sacro Monte di Varallo, Milano, Bompiani, 2009.
- Elena De Filippis, Guida del Sacro Monte di Varallo, Tipolitografia, Borgosesia 2009.
- Fabio Tononi, “Intermediality and Immersion in Gaudenzio Ferrari’s Adoration of the Magi in Chapel V of the Sacred Mountain of Varallo”, PsicoArt: Rivista di Arte e Psicologia, Vol. 10 (2020), pp. 1–18.

== Gallery ==
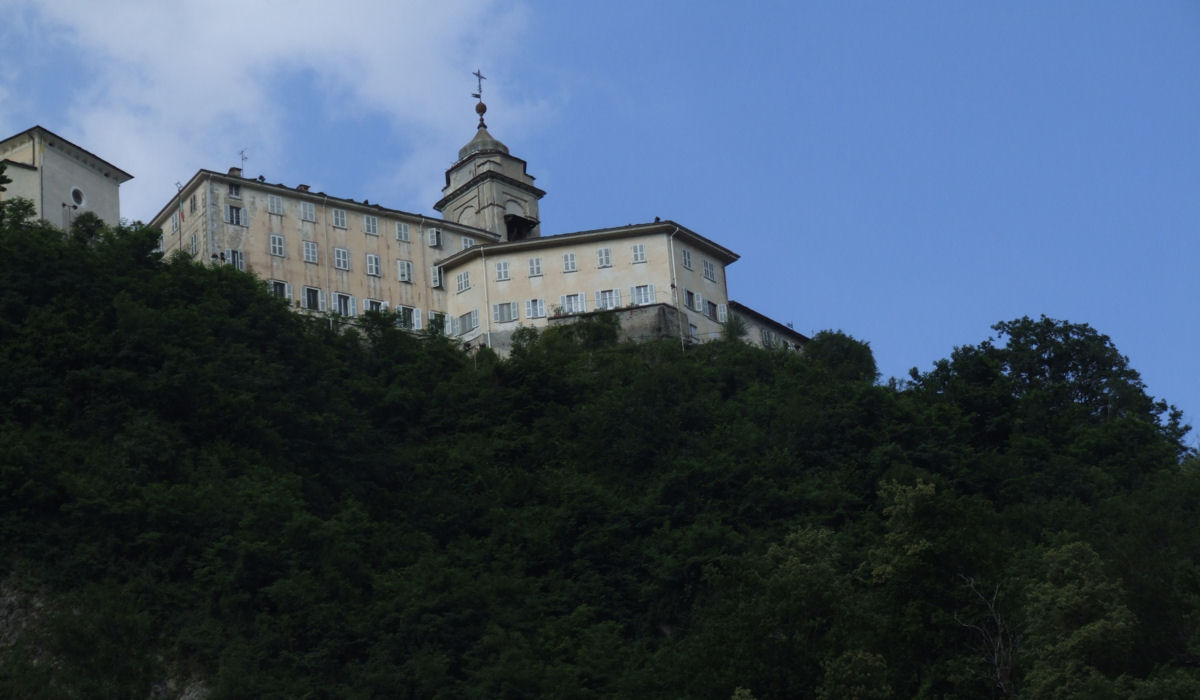
View of Supra montem

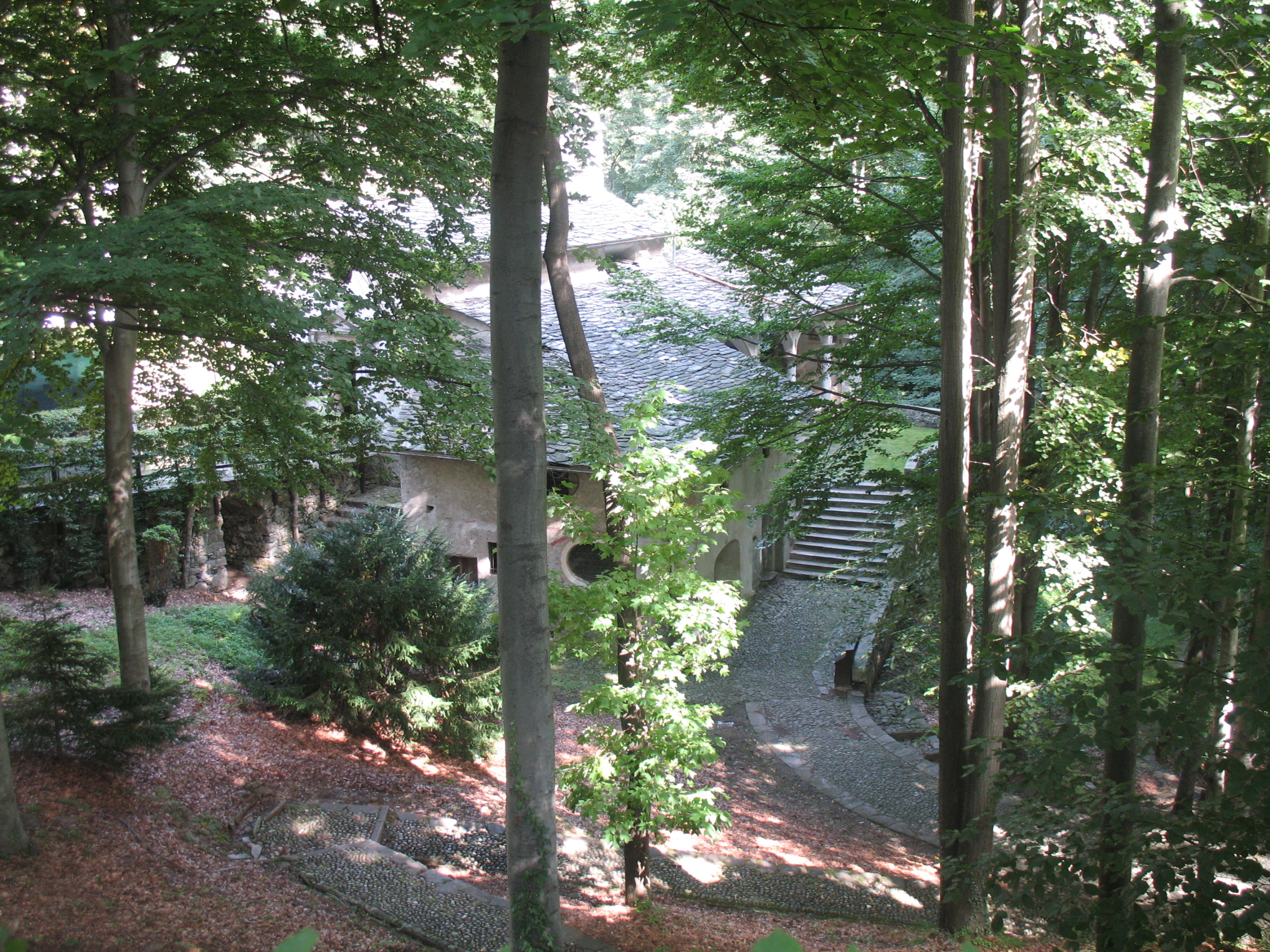
View of the park and chapels

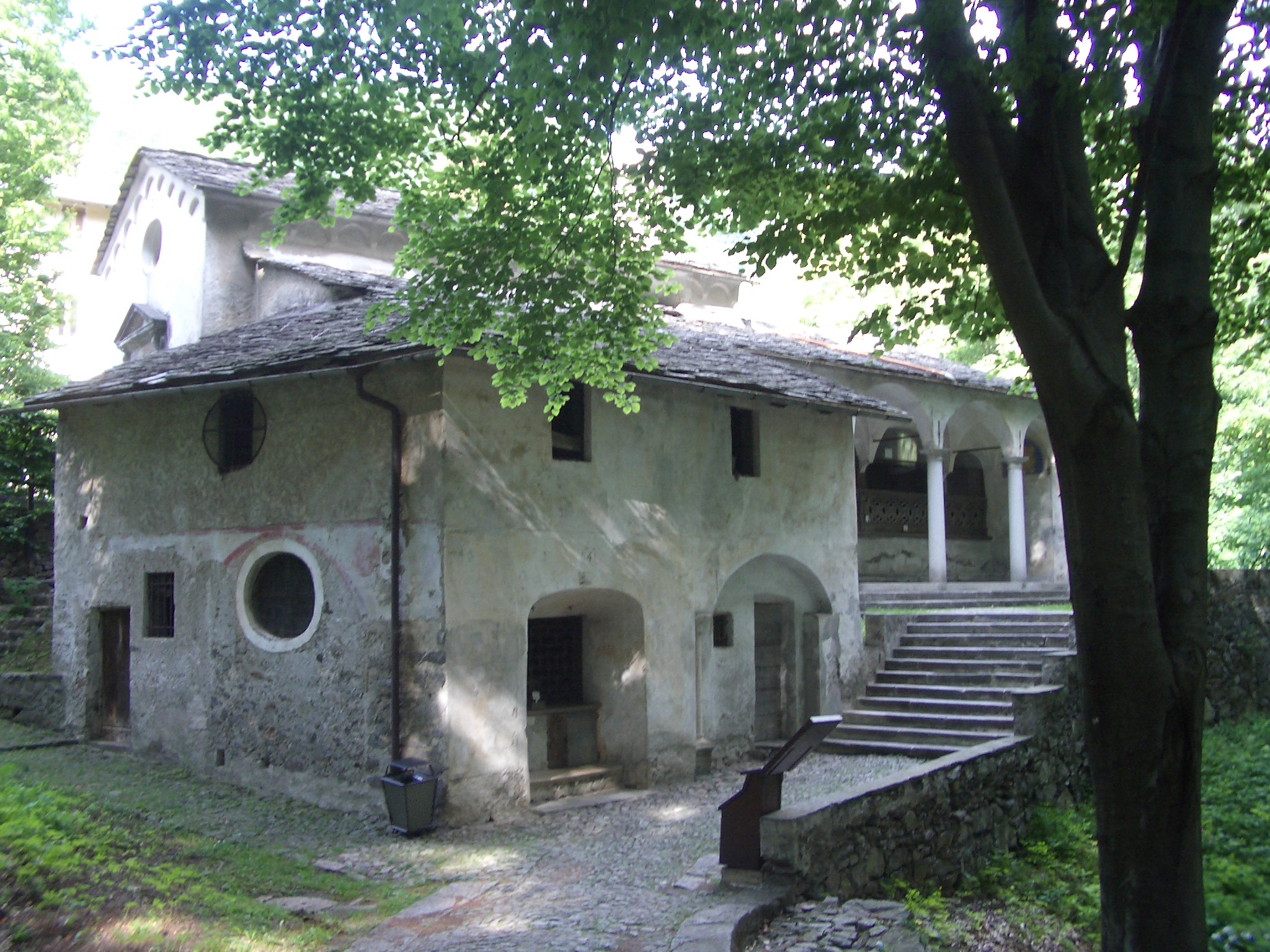
Chapels of the Annunciation (structure with chapels II, III, IV)

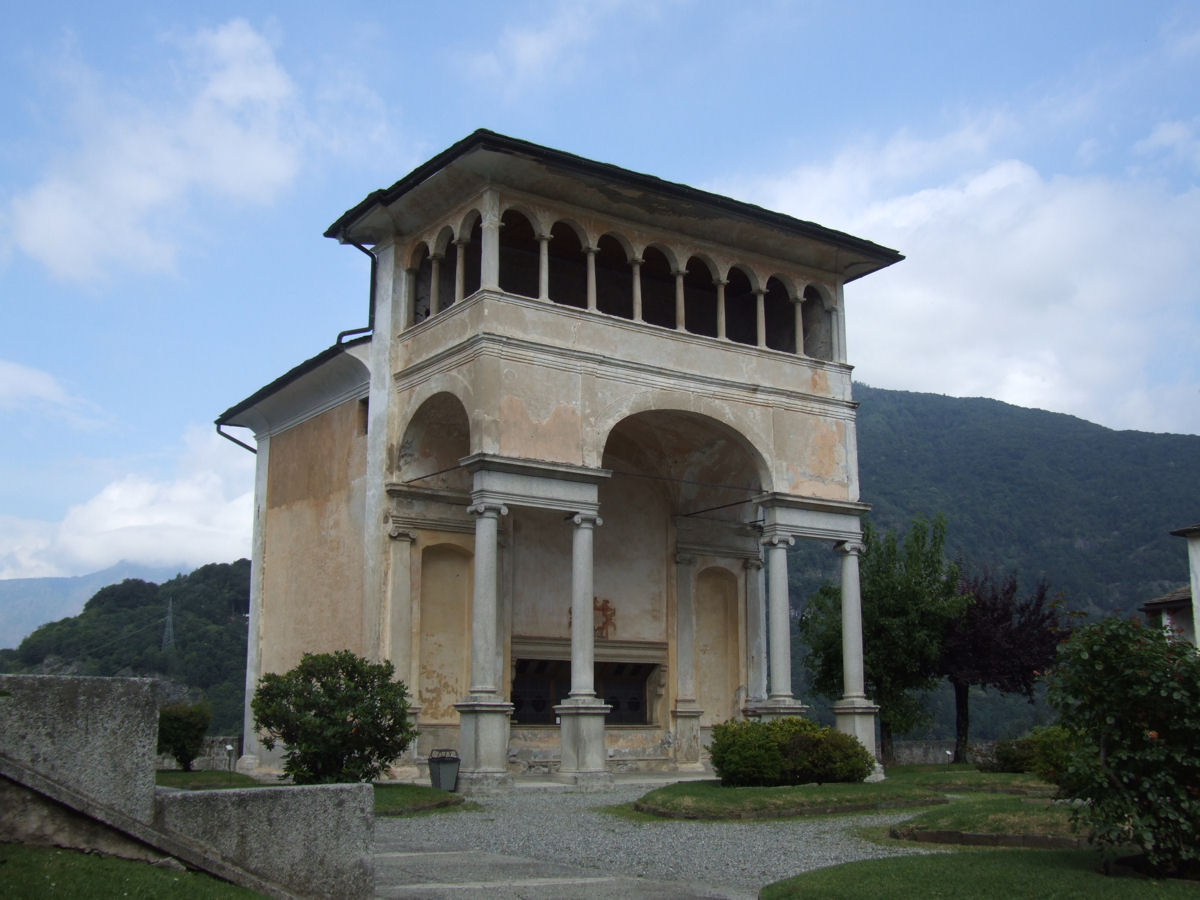
Chapel XXVIII, Gesù al tribunale di Erode

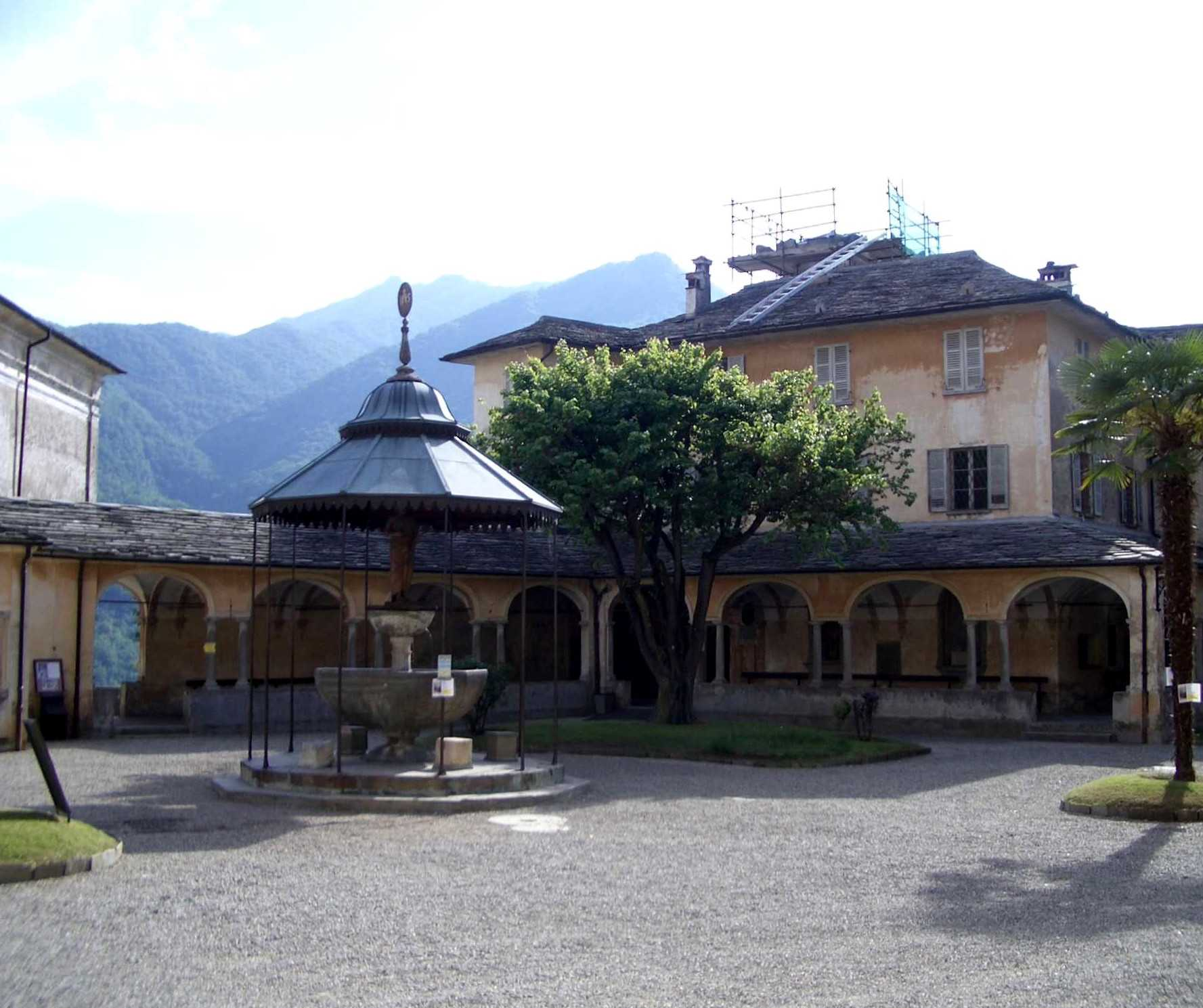
Square of the Basilica, La fontana e la chiesa del S. Sepolcro

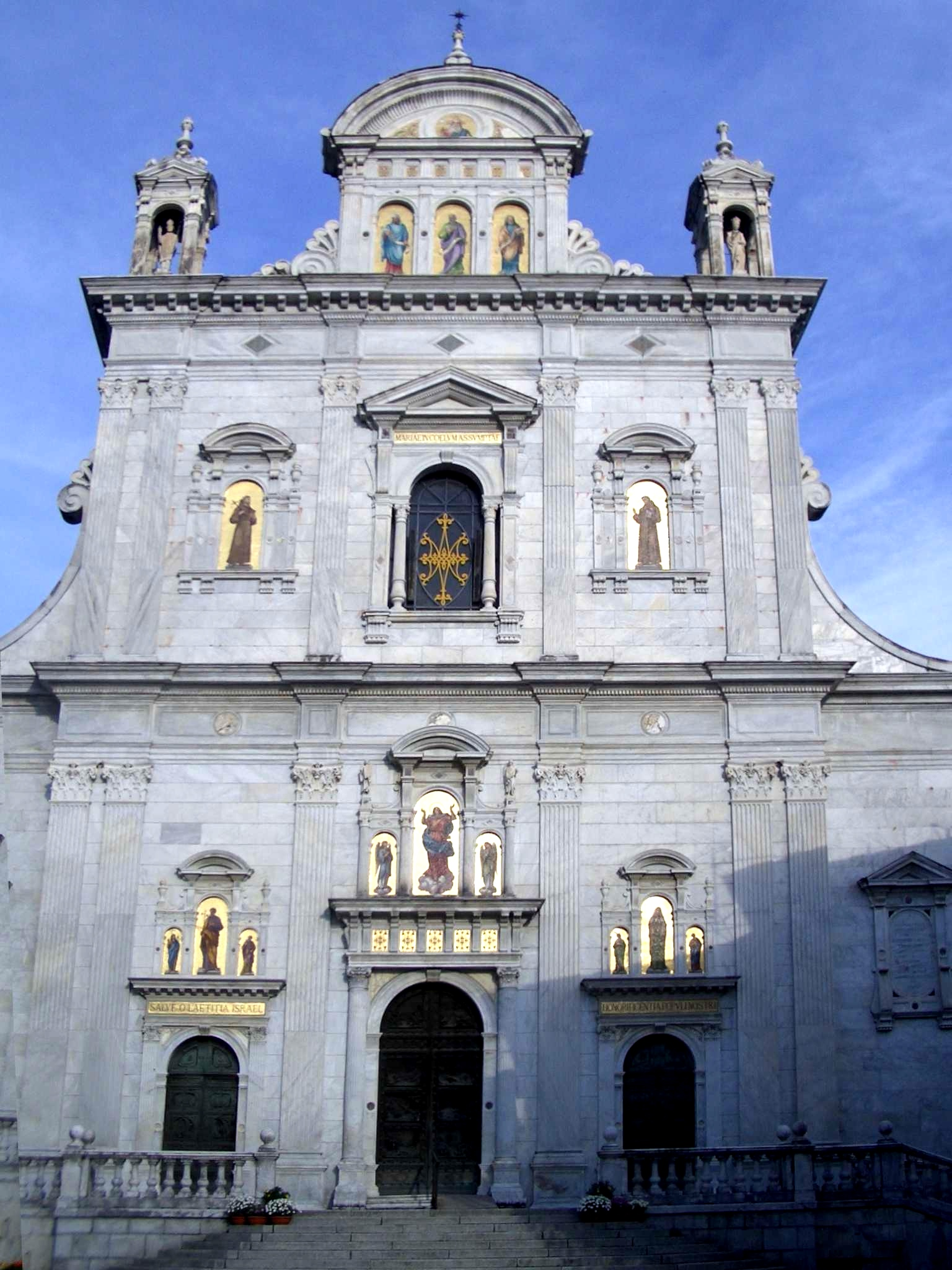
Façade of the Basilica
