= Varallo Sesia =

Varallo
- Comune
- Città di Varallo
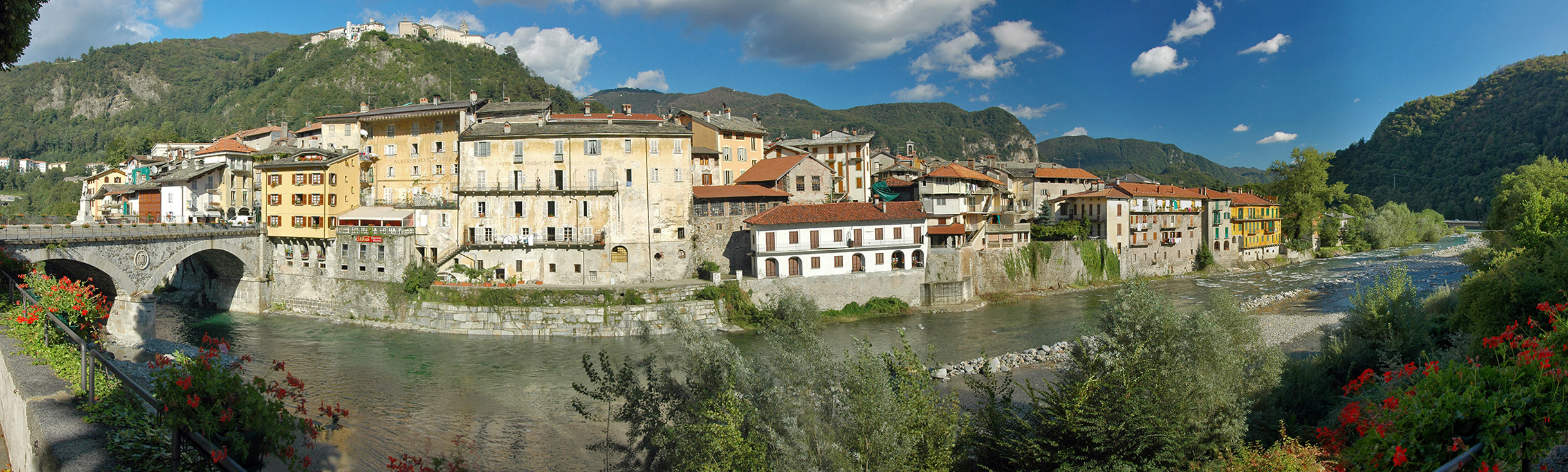

- Coat of arms

- Location within Italy Location within Piedmont
- Coordinates: 45°48′50″N 8°15′30″E
- Country: Italy
- Region: Piedmont
- Province: Vercelli (VC)
- Frazioni: Arboerio, Balangera, Camasco, Cervarolo, Dovesio, Locarno, Morca, Morondo, Parone, Roccapietra, Sabbia, Scopelle, Valmaggia

Government
  - Mayor: Pietro Bondetti (since 2022)

Area
  - Total: 102.97 km^{2} (39.76 sq mi)
- Elevation: 456 m (1,496 ft)

Population (1 January 2017)
  - Total: 7,195
  - Density: 69.87/km^{2} (181.0/sq mi)
- Demonym: Varallesi
- Time zone: UTC+1 (CET)
  - Summer (DST): UTC+2 (CEST)
- Postal code: 13019
- Dialing code: 0163
- Patron saint: Saint Gaudenzio
- Saint day: 22 January
- Website: Official website

Varallo Sesia (Piedmontese: Varal), pronunciation (Vhuh-rahl-loh) commonly known as Varallo, is a comune and town in the province of Vercelli in the Piedmont region of Italy. It is situated in Valsesia, at 450 metres (1,480 ft) above sea level and some 66 kilometres (41 mi) north-northeast of Vercelli and 55 kilometres (34 mi) northwest of Novara.

Once called Varade, it is divided into two boroughs (Varallo Vecchia and Varallo Nuova) by the Mastallone stream.

In 1971, Varallo was awarded the Golden Medal for Military Valor for the deeds of its population against the German occupation in the late stages of World War II.

== Geography ==
The valley of the Sesia is very narrow at this point as it nears its source. Varallo lies on the left bank where the Mastallone flows into the Sesia.

The town is surrounded by the foothills of the Alps and is not far from Monte Rosa, which is visible from the surrounding hills.

== Main sights ==
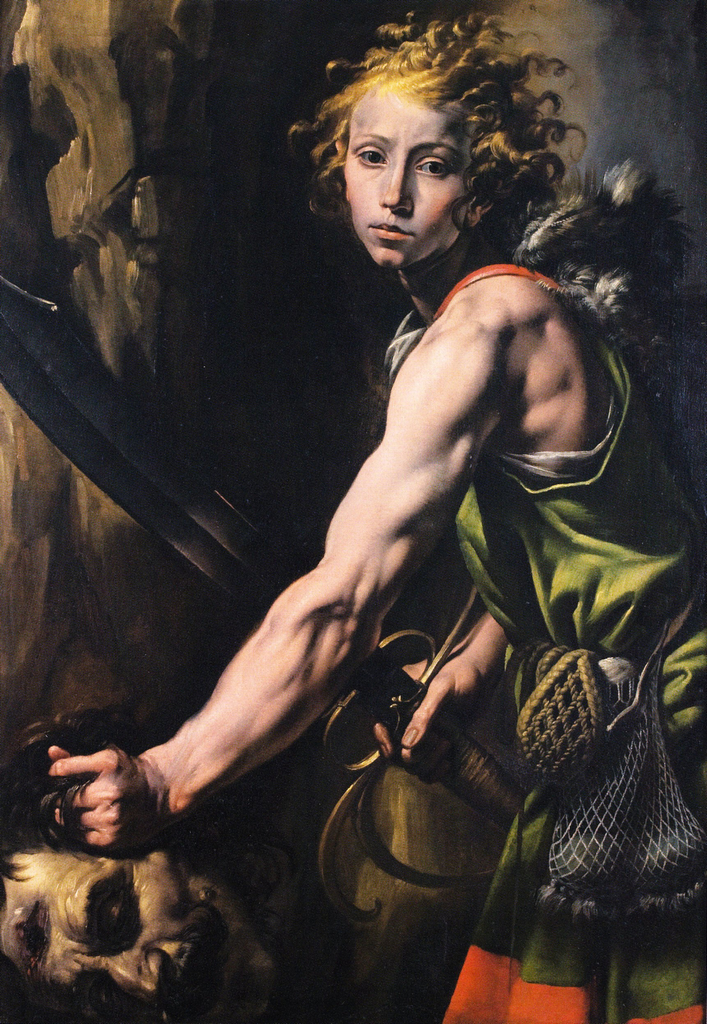
Tanzio da Varallo, David and Goliath, c.1625 (Pinacoteca civica, Varallo)

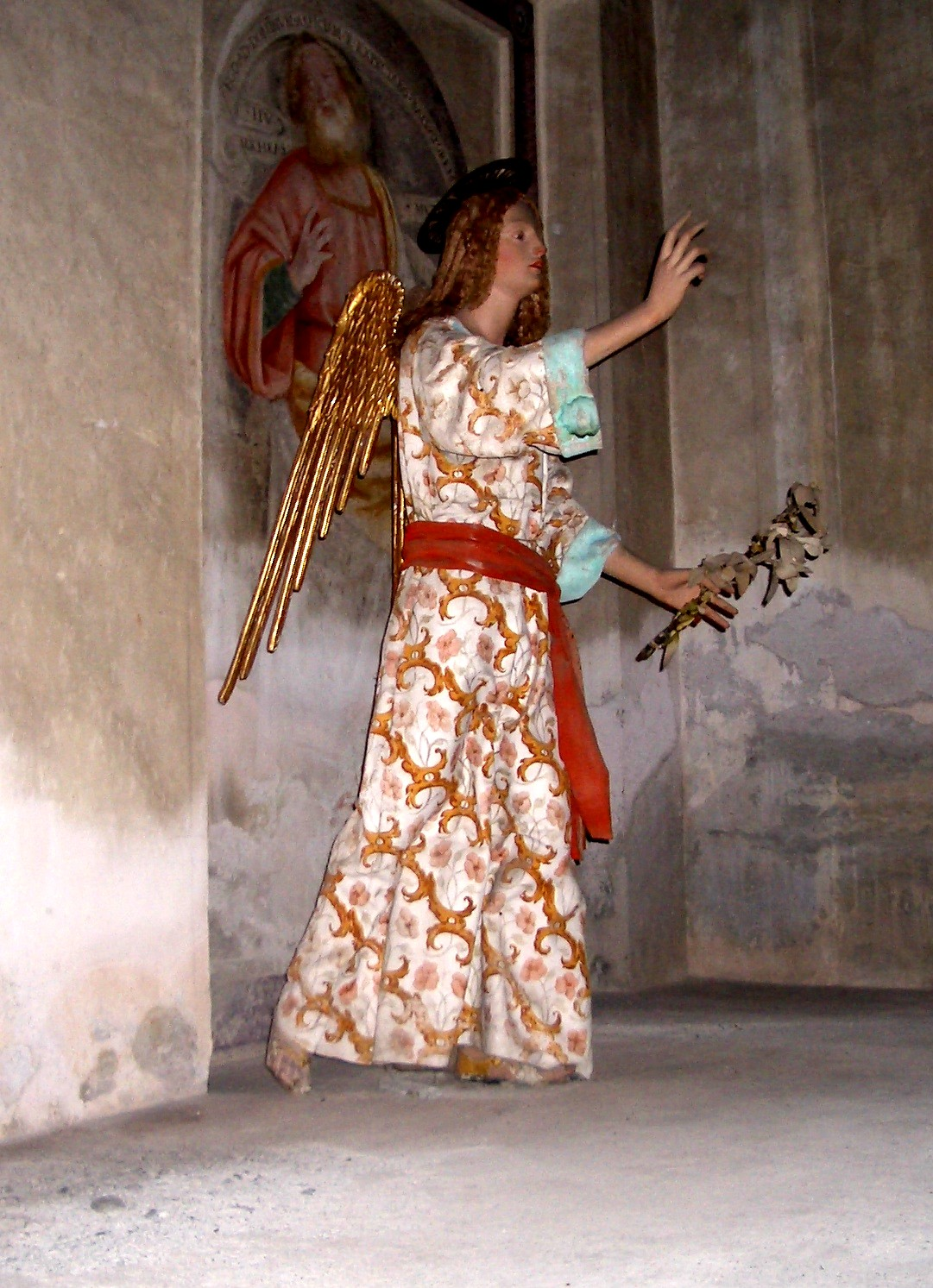
Gaudenzio Ferrari’s statue of the angel Gabriel from the Annunciation tableau in Chapel II of the Sacro Monte

The churches of San Gaudenzio, Santa Maria delle Grazie, and Santa Maria di Loreto, all contain works by Gaudenzio Ferrari, who was born in the neighbouring Valduggia.

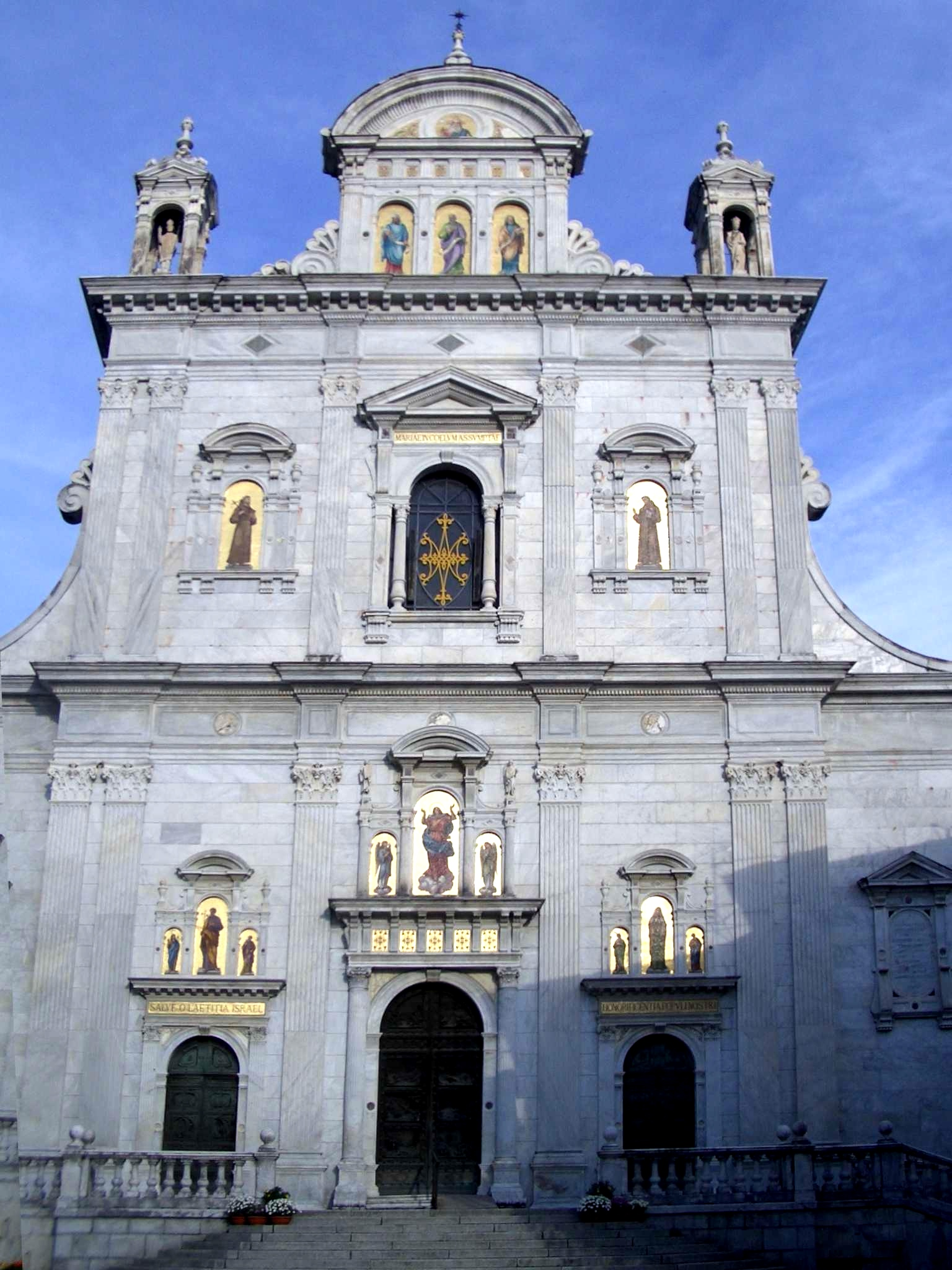
Basilica

Museums and galleries include the Pinacoteca Civica (the David and Goliath pictured is by Tanzio da Varallo who was born in the frazione Riale), the Museo Comola in the frazione Camasco, the Museo Scaglia and the Museo di Storia Naturale Calderini.

About 150 metres (490 ft) above the town the Sacro Monte di Varallo is one of the most famous Piedmontese pilgrimage sites, and the oldest of the Sacri Monti of Piedmont and Lombardy which were inscribed by UNESCO in the World Heritage List in 2003. The environs are composed of winding paths leading past 45 chapel-like enclosures containing groups of life-size painted terra-cotta figures with backgrounds in fresco (by Gaudenzio Ferrari and others). The tableaux represent scenes mainly from the life of Jesus. The array was initiated by a Franciscan, Bernardino Caimi, who aimed to reproduce locally images of the passion as a goal of pilgrims. The main pilgrimage church was built by Pellegrino Tibaldi after 1578. In the works mentioned, Ferrari's whole development may be traced. With its Sacro Monte, its ensemble of historic churches in the city centre, and enduring acts of popular devotion, Varallo stands as an authentic 'holy city' for Piedmont and the subalpine region, grounded in a solid biblical spirituality. In the frazione of Arboerio are the old church of Saints Quirico and Giulitta, with a 17th-century polyptych and an altar of the Madonna del Rosario, and the Villa Eremo.

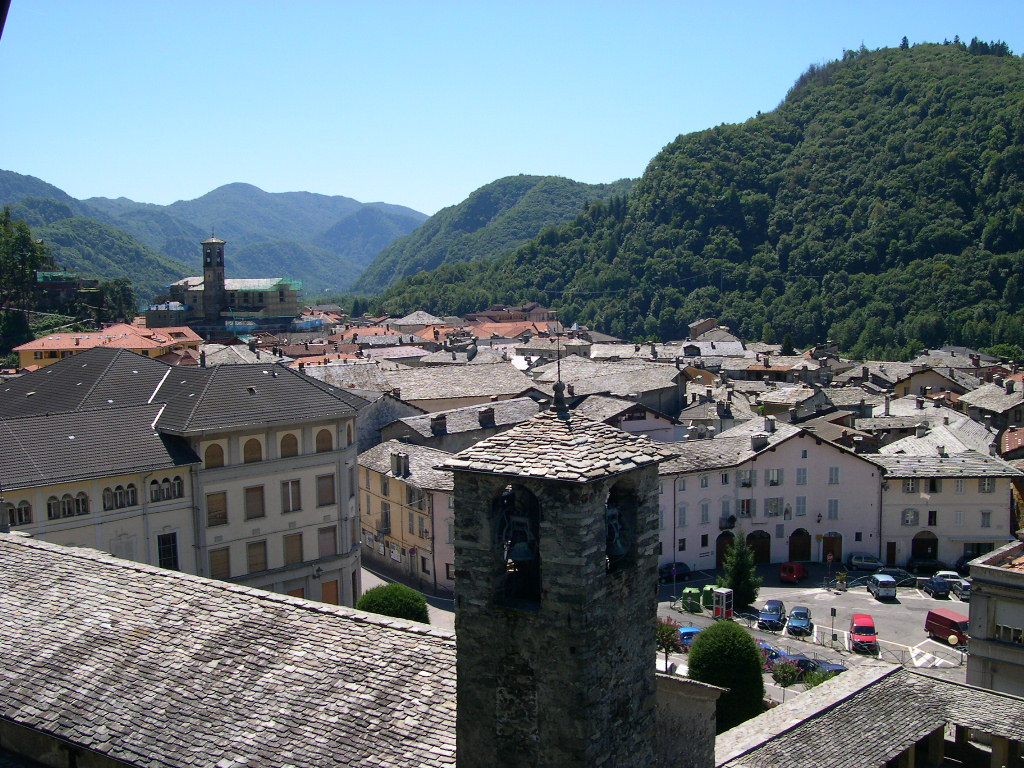
Varallo Sesia skyline

== Twin towns — sister cities ==
Varallo Sesia is twinned with:

- Die, France

== See also ==
- Varallo Sesia railway station
- Varallo Pombia, a commune in the Province of Novara
