= Recchi =

Recchi is an Italian surname. Notable people with the surname include:

- Angelo Recchi (born 1951), Italian footballer
- Giovanni Battista Recchi, 17th-century Italian painter
- Giovanni Paolo Recchi (mid-17th century), 17th-century Italian painter
- Giuseppe Recchi (born 1964), Italian businessman
- Mark Recchi (born 1968), Canadian ice hockey player and coach
