= Pier Francesco Mazzucchelli =

Italian painter (1573–1626)

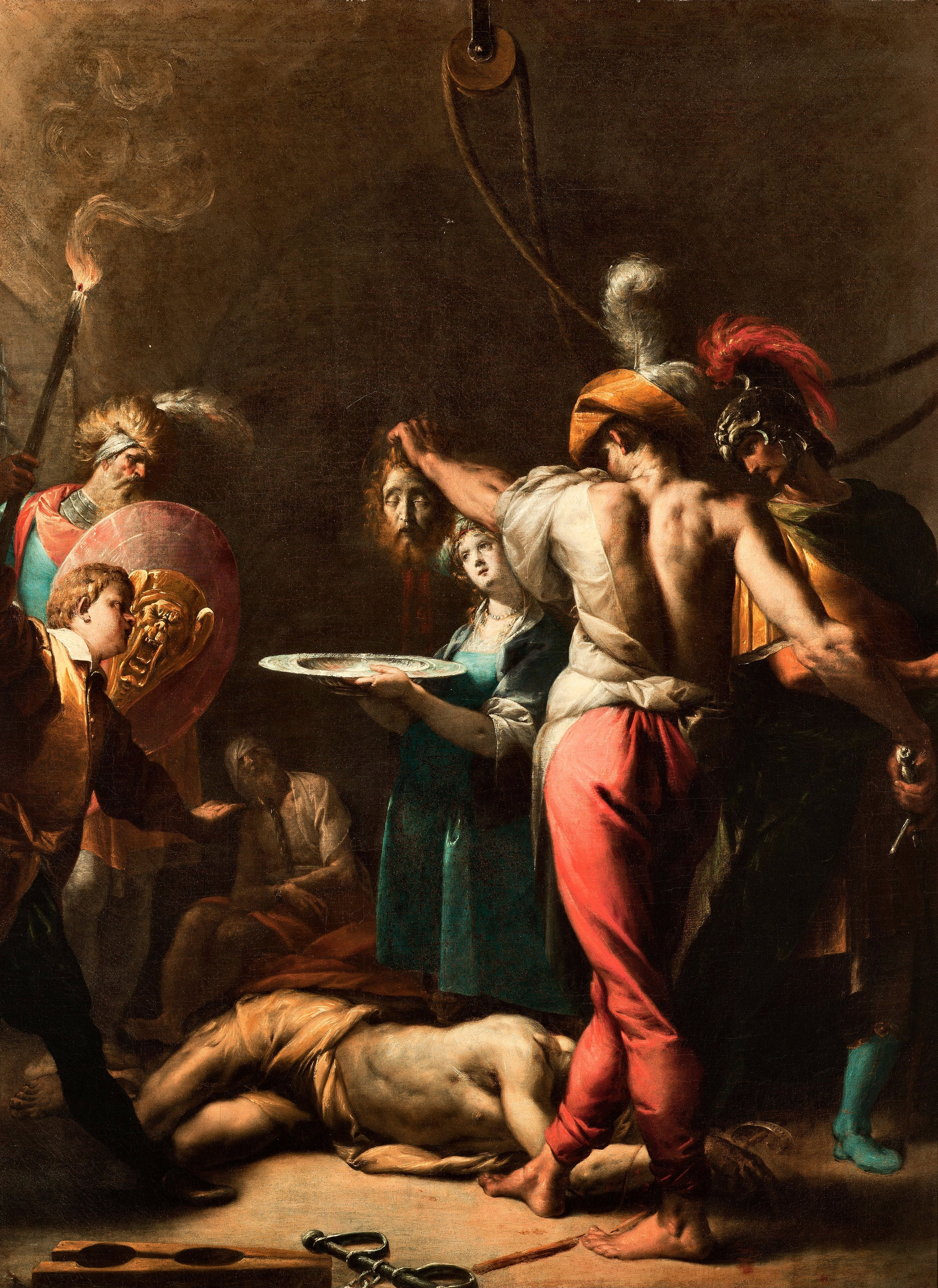
- Decapitation of St. John the Baptist (c. 1620), Musei di Strada Nuova, Genoa
- Born: July 29, 1573; Morazzone, Duchy of Milan
- Died: 1626 (aged 52–53); Piacenza, Duchy of Parma and Piacenza
- Other name: Il Morazzone
- Education: Ventura Salimbeni
- Known for: Painting
- Movement: Mannerism; Baroque

Pier Francesco Mazzucchelli (commonly known as il Morazzone; 29 July 1573 – 1626) was an Italian painter and draughtsman who was active in Milan. He is mainly known for his altarpieces, but his outstanding achievements are large decorative frescoes for the Sacro Monte di Varese and the Sacro Monte di Varallo. With Giovanni Battista Crespi, Giulio Cesare Procaccini and Tanzio da Varallo, he was one of the principal Lombard painters of the early 17th century. Like many of his contemporaries, he was strongly affected by the piety and mysticism of the teaching of Charles Borromeo, yet his work is distinguished from theirs by a greater classicism, owing to his training in Rome.

== Life ==
=== Training and early works, to 1611 ===
He was born in Morazzone, near Varese, Lombardy, the son of a mason, who soon after his birth moved to Rome. Borsieri (1619) claimed that he was taught there principally by the Sienese painter Ventura Salimbeni, whereas Baglione (1642) stated that he frequented the various academies of Rome. It is likely that he also gained experience in the workshop of the Cavalier D'Arpino. In Rome, Morazzone worked in several important churches, including Santa Maria Maddalena delle Convertite, the courtyard of Saint John Lateran and the sacristy of St. Peter’s. The only such works to have survived are two frescoes in the church of San Silvestro in Capite, a Visitation and an Adoration of the Magi. These works draw on a variety of stylistic sources and suggest a response to the art of Taddeo Zuccari and of Sienese followers of Federico Barocci such as Salimbeni. His style also shows exposure to another pupil of D'Arpino, Caravaggio. His depictions of martyrdom and ecstasy are imbued with the morbid religiosity characteristic of Lombardy in his age.

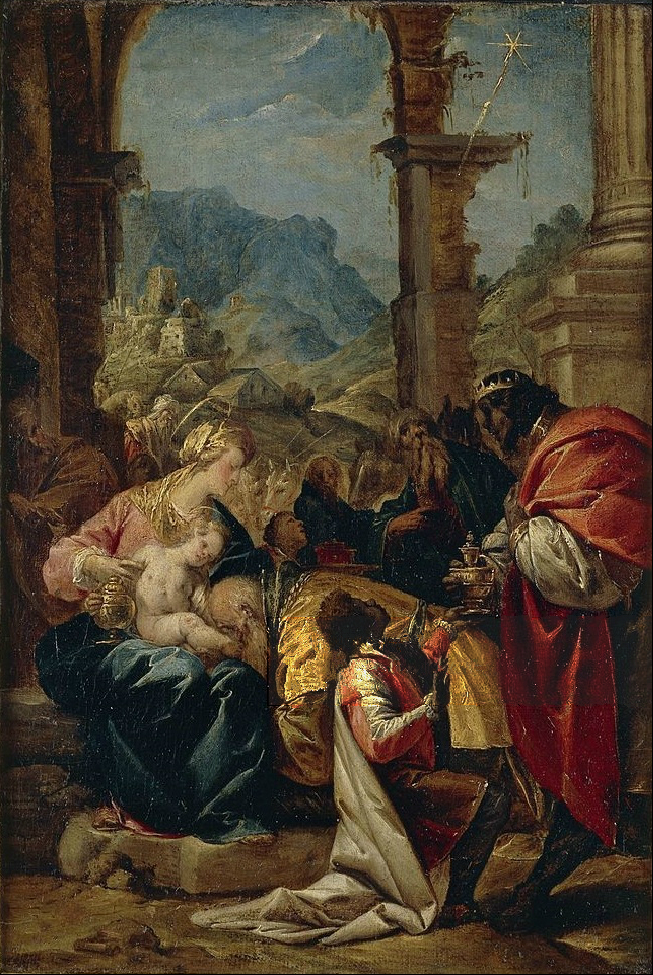
Adoration of the Magi, c. 1620, Pinacoteca Ambrosiana, Milan

Around 1597, for reasons that are not clear, Morazzone left Rome, and by 1598 he was in Varese. His first documented works there are vault frescoes of Musician Angels and the Coronation of the Virgin in the chapel of the Rosary in San Vittore. He soon established himself in Lombardy and in Piedmont. In 1602 he worked in Milan Cathedral, with Paolo Camillo Landriani (‘il Duchino’, 1560–1618) on the Meeting of St. Charles Borromeo with Duke Emanuel-Philibert of Savoy, and alone on St. Charles Borromeo Refusing Ecclesiastical Benefices, parts of a cycle of paintings illustrating the saint’s life. His frescoes in the chapel of San Giorgio in the Santuario at Rho, showing scenes from the Life of St. George (probably commissioned prior to 1603), indicate that at this point he was moving away from Roman Mannerism and developing a more typically Lombard style, strongly influenced by the early 16th-century art of Gaudenzio Ferrari. There followed frescoes of scenes from the Life of a Martyred Soldier (1603–6) in the church of the Crocefisso at Tradate. Here, stylistic differences between the central and lateral scenes have led some to consider the fresco on the altar wall as the work of another artist.

In 1605–6 Morazzone worked for the first time on the Sacro Monte di Varallo, frescoing the chapel of the Ascent to Calvary (1602–1606). The contract for this work, which had been drawn up in 1602, stipulated that he model his work on Ferrari’s frescoes (c. 1509) for the chapel of the Crucifixion. This influence shows in the realism of the soldiers riding through a broad landscape, which serves as a backdrop to sculpted figures by Jean de Wespin. In 1608, Morazzone was commissioned to paint 12 small scenes from the Life of St. Abbondio to be set into the embroidery of the standard of the Compagnia del Santissimo Sacramento of Como (Como Cathedral). He received payments in 1609 and 1610, which suggests that his work on these paintings alternated with work on frescoes of the Passion (completed May 1609) in the chapel of the Flagellation on another Sacro Monte, that at Varese. The putti in the frescoes at Varese reveal the lingering influence of the Cavaliere d’Arpino’s method of composition.

On 25 July 1609, Morazzone was commissioned to execute the frescoes in the chapel of the Ecce Homo on the Sacro Monte of Varallo. Here he worked (1610) with the sculptor Giovanni d’Enrico to create a tour de force of illusionism: d’Enrico’s terracotta figures are surrounded by Morazzone’s painted scenes, the frescoes fully integrating with the sculptures to give an impression of extended space. A fresco of Vulcan’s Forge (Milan, Sforza Castle), originating from a house in Morazzone traditionally identified as the painter’s own, also dates from this period. In the Annunciation (c. 1610; Lucca, Museo e Pinacoteca Nazionale), the archaic setting conforms with the demands of the Counter-Reformation for simplicity and clarity, and the figures indicate a familiarity with works by Camillo and Giulio Cesare Procaccini. Jacob Wrestling with the Angel (Milan, Palazzo Arcivescovile) is usually dated to c. 1610.

=== Later works, after 1610 ===
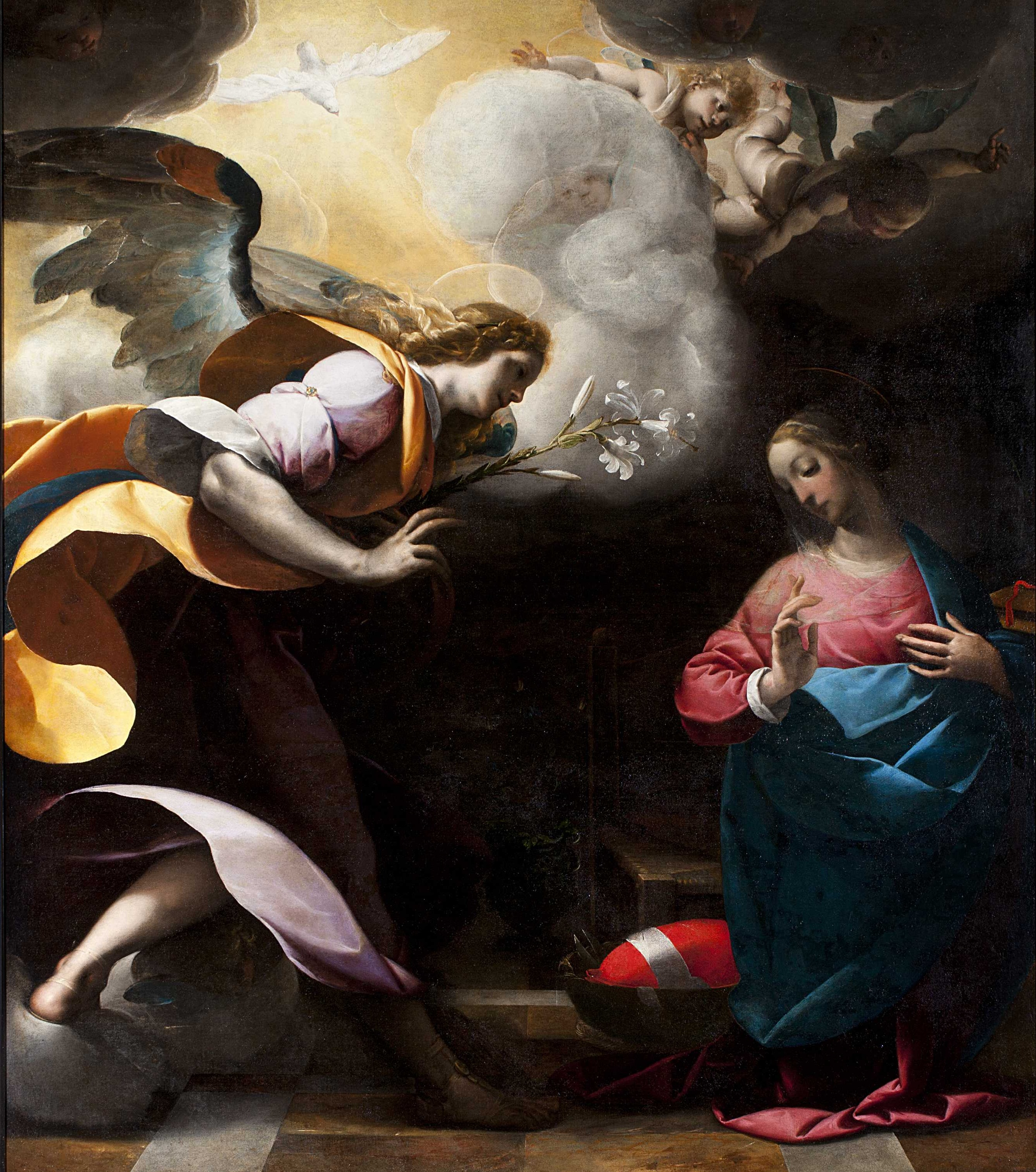
The Annunciation, 1607–1617, Ca' Granda, Milan

The altarpiece Mary Magdalene Borne to Heaven by Angels (completed 1611; Varese, San Vittore), capped with an image of God the Father and set with a predella beneath of a Noli me tangere in a vast landscape, is close in date to an elegant Adoration of the Magi (Sant'Antonio Abate, Milan), which makes use of a similar range of bright hues. To the same period belongs a St. Roch, strongly reminiscent of Cerano, and a cycle of frescoes with scenes from the lives of St. Roch, St. Lawrence ‘dal Pozzo’ and St. Lawrence the Deacon in San Bartolomeo, Borgomanero. The Massacre of the Innocents (Milan, Palazzo Arcivescovile) dates from 1611–12 , and the Fall of the Rebel Angels (Como, Museo Civico Archeologico) between 1609 and 1612.

Payments to Morazzone are recorded between May 1611 and August 1612 for the frescoes in the Sagrestia dei Mansionari in Como Cathedral. The ceiling fresco, which shows the Coronation of the Virgin, is close in style to the frescoes in the chapel of the Ecce Homo in Varallo, both being indebted to Ferrari. Also in 1612 Morazzone was working in Sant'Agostino in Como, where he executed four scenes from the Life of the Virgin for the Cappella della Cintura: the Nativity, the Presentation of the Virgin, the Marriage at Cana and the Pentecost. The Pentecost is reminiscent of Barocci, whereas in the Nativity the example of Ferrari is again dominant, the arrangement of the scene on two levels being a direct borrowing from him. It is not clear whether the chapel’s small frescoes of the Life of the Virgin, framed with stuccowork, are by Morazzone or a follower.

In 1613, the Canon of Como Cathedral, Quintilio Lucini Passalacqua, commissioned the decoration of a writing-desk (Milan, Sforza Castle), for which Morazzone painted five biblical scenes on copper, thematically linked to the moral proposed by the Canon himself: ‘When Reason takes the senses as its guide, things go awry.’ In 1614 Morazzone was once more in Varallo to begin the decoration of the chapel of the Condemnation, which had been commissioned in 1610. The frescoes, completed in 1617, and in particular the angels, demonstrate the influence of the contemporary works of Giulio Cesare Procaccini, which characterises all Morazzone’s work of this decade.

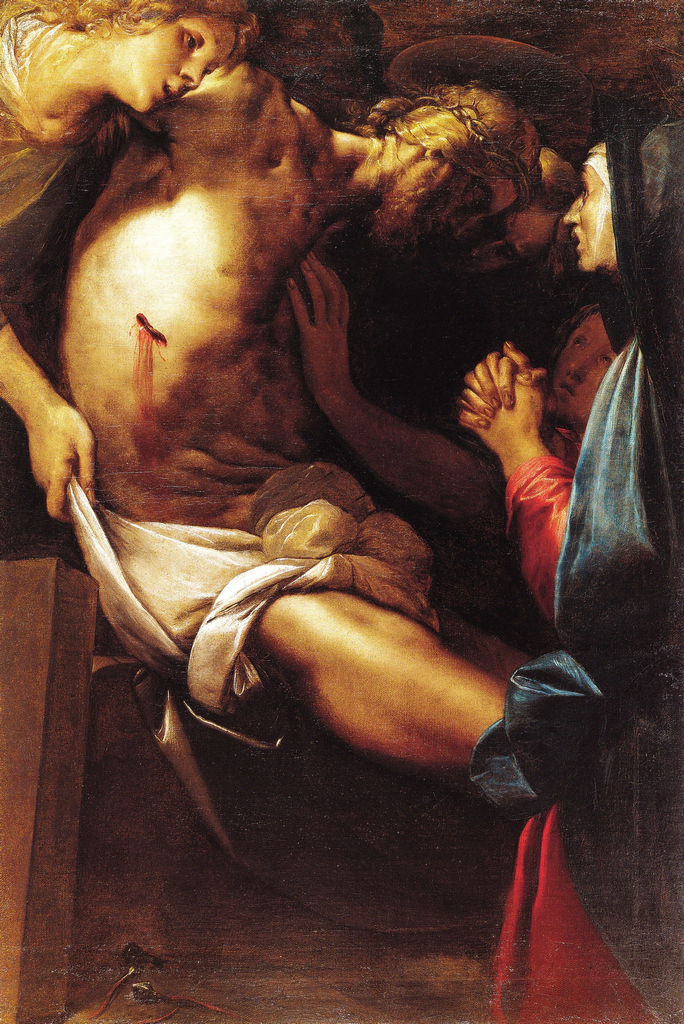
Burial of Jesus, 1616–1620, Koelliker priv. col., Milan

In 1615 he received the final payment for the Pentecost (Milan, Sforza Castle), which originally decorated the vault of the Sala delle Congregazioni, adjacent to the chapel of the Tribunale di Provvisione in Milan, and in which the daring foreshortening that dominates the composition recalls similar illusionistic experiments carried out in Lombardy by Giulio Campi and Gian Paolo Lomazzo. In the same period, he frescoed scenes from the Life of the Virgin (1615–17) and executed in oil the Fifteen Mysteries of the Rosary for the chapel of the Rosary, San Vittore, Varese.

In 1616, Morazzone helped fresco chapel X of the Sacromonte at Orta with the Vision of St. Francis, but his work there does not extend beyond the internal grille; the frescoes (1623) around the altar are by G. F. Monti. Between 1616 and 1619, Morazzone returned to San Bartolomeo, Borgomanero, to work in the chapel of San Charles, painting an altarpiece with St. Charles Borromeo in Glory and frescoes of scenes from the Life of St. Charles drawn from the biography of the saint written in 1610 by G. P. Giussano. The altarpiece is conservative in format, but it is an intensely dramatic and harshly realistic work, which suggests awareness of work by Tanzio da Varallo, who had recently returned to Piedmont from Rome.

In 1617 Morazzone was paid for the altarpiece, showing the Virgin of the Rosary with St. Dominic and St. Catherine of Siena, for the Certosa di Pavia. Here his style draws closest to the dominant tendency in Milanese painting established by Cerano and Giulio Cerare Procaccini. The artist’s frenetic activity in these years includes a commission from the Tovagliari family for frescoes (1617) in the chapel of the Assumption of the Virgin in Sant'Ambrogio, Varese. Between 1617 and 1619, he painted six canvases of scenes from the Life of the Virgin for the presbytery of Santa Maria Nascente, Arona, all characterised by spectacular Caravaggesque chiaroscuro effects. The St. Roch (Milan, Sforza Castle), executed for the side wall of the chapel of the Tribunale di Provvisione in Milan and the Dream of Elijah (Milan, San Raffaele) also date from this period. The small picture of St. Charles Adoring the Crucifix (1618; Milan, Palazzo Arcivescovile) is an outstanding example of the profound pathos and religious mysticism of Morazzone’s most powerful art.

The artist was in Novara towards 1620 to execute the frescoes and the canvas of the Last Judgement, in the chapel of the Buona Morte in San Gaudenzio (1619–20). This dramatic cycle, with its macabre details, horrifying imagery and doom-laden atmosphere, is one of his outstanding works and epitomises the morbid intensity of Lombard painting in the early 17th century. Almost contemporary are the Marriage of the Virgin (Gallarate, Santa Maria Assunta) and the Virgin and Child with St. Francis now in Sant'Ambrogio e Carlo al Corso. Slightly later are the Martyrdom of St. Catherine in Santa Maria, Oleggio, and Christ and the Samaritan Woman (Milan, Pinacoteca di Brera), which reveal the influence of contemporary Genoese painting.

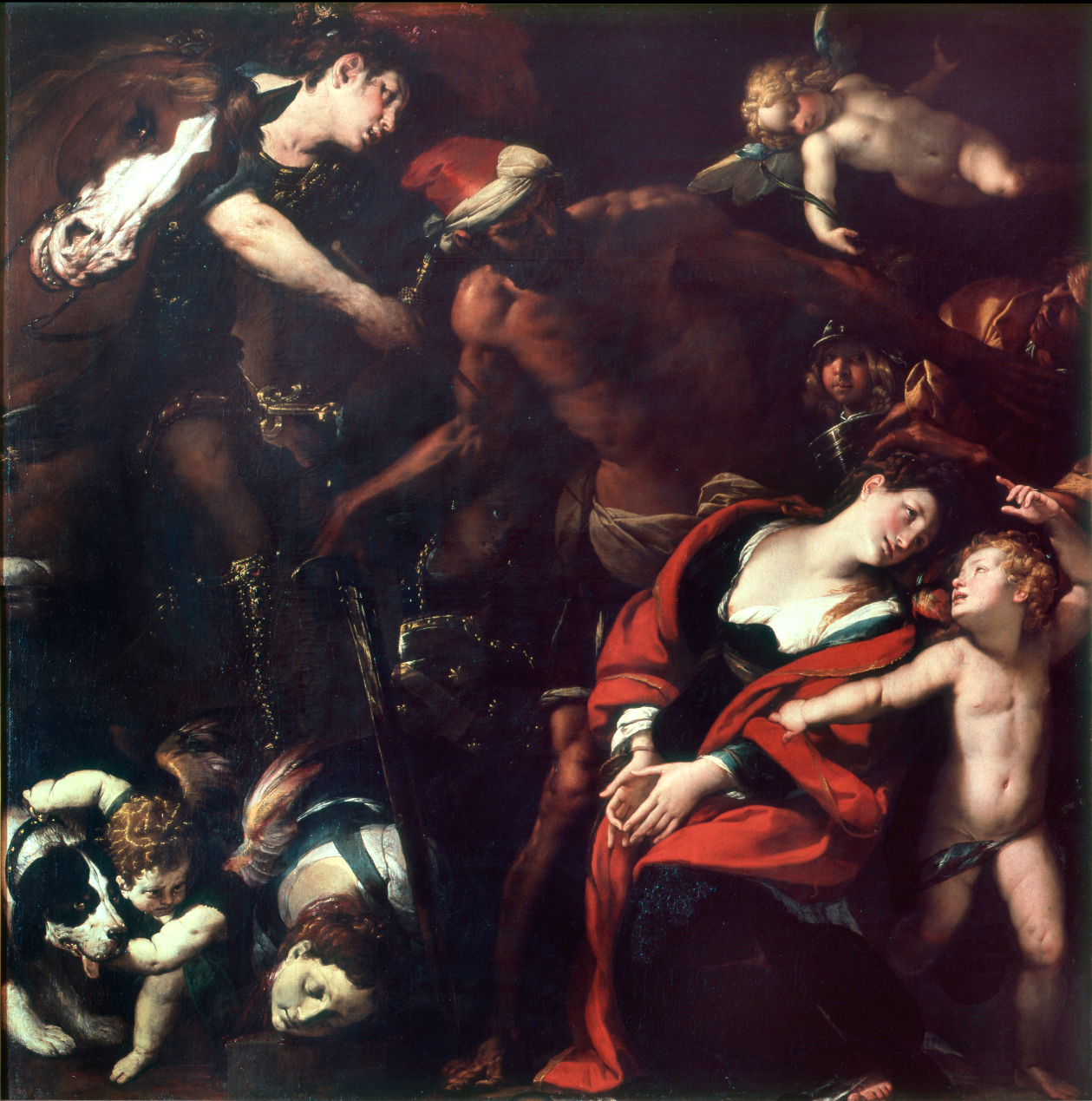
The Martyrdom of Saints Secunda and Rufina. Collaboration between Il Morazzone, Procaccini and Il Cerano (1620-1625)

That Morazzone received commissions from Liguria is suggested by the altarpiece of St. Charles Adoring the Virgin, in the parish church of Sestri Levante, Genoa. In this period, Morazzone participated, together with Cerano and the Procaccini, in the execution of a series of canvases for Charles Emmanuel I, Duke of Savoy, which represent the territories ruled by the House of Savoy. The series was painted in Turin between 1618 and 1623; the only surviving work by Morazzone is the large Allegory of the Province of Susa (Turin, Galleria Sabauda). In the first half of the 1620s, he collaborated with Cerano and Giulio Cesare Procaccini on the Martyrdom of St. Rufina and St. Secunda (Milan, Pinacoteca di Brera), a picture now celebrated as il quadro delle tre mani. Morazzone was responsible for the execution of the torturer in the centre of the picture, the angel above and the heads of the background figures.

Among Morazzone’s last works are canvases commissioned by Ferdinando Gonzaga, 6th Duke of Mantua, in 1622 and 1623 (the Marriage at Cana in a private collection in Rome is perhaps an oil sketch for one of these), St. Anthony Abbot and Paul the Hermit (Milan, Pinacoteca di Brera), which almost certainly comes from the Archbishop’s Palace in Milan, and frescoes in the dome of Piacenza Cathedral. These frescoes were begun in 1625 but never completed; indeed, Morazzone executed only two figures of Prophets: David and Isaiah. On 12 May 1626, the Bishop of Piacenza and the cathedral authorities engaged the services of Guercino to complete the cycle, and it is probable that by that date Morazzone was dead. Among the pupils and followers of il Morazzone were Francesco Cairo, Stefano & Gioseffo Danedi, Isidoro Bianchi, Giovanni Paolo & Giovanni Battista Recchi, Paolo Caccianiga, Tommaso Formenti, Giambatista Pozzi, and Cristoforo Martinolli della Rocca.

== Gallery ==
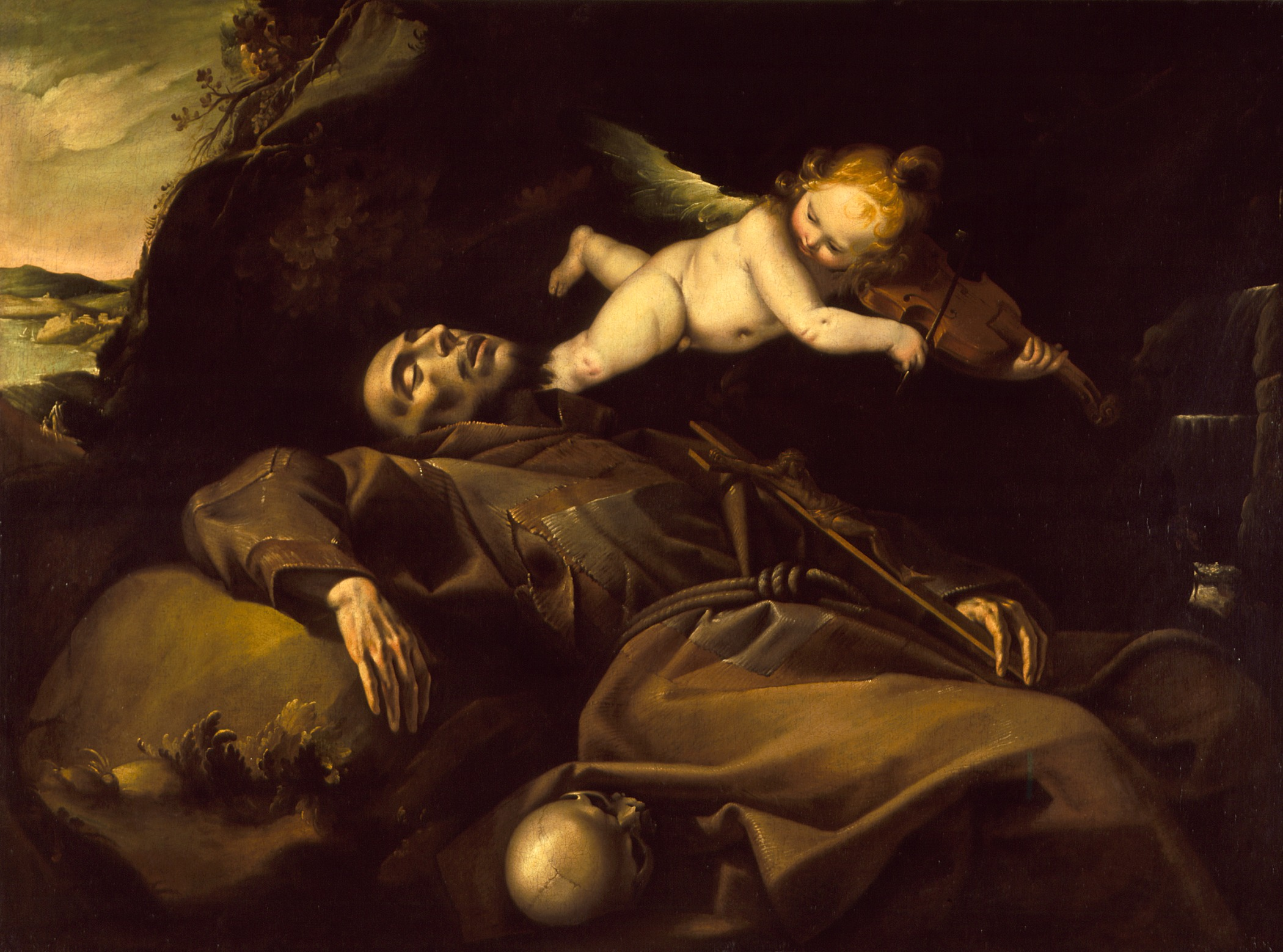
The Ecstasy of Saint Francis, c. 1615, Los Angeles County Museum of Art

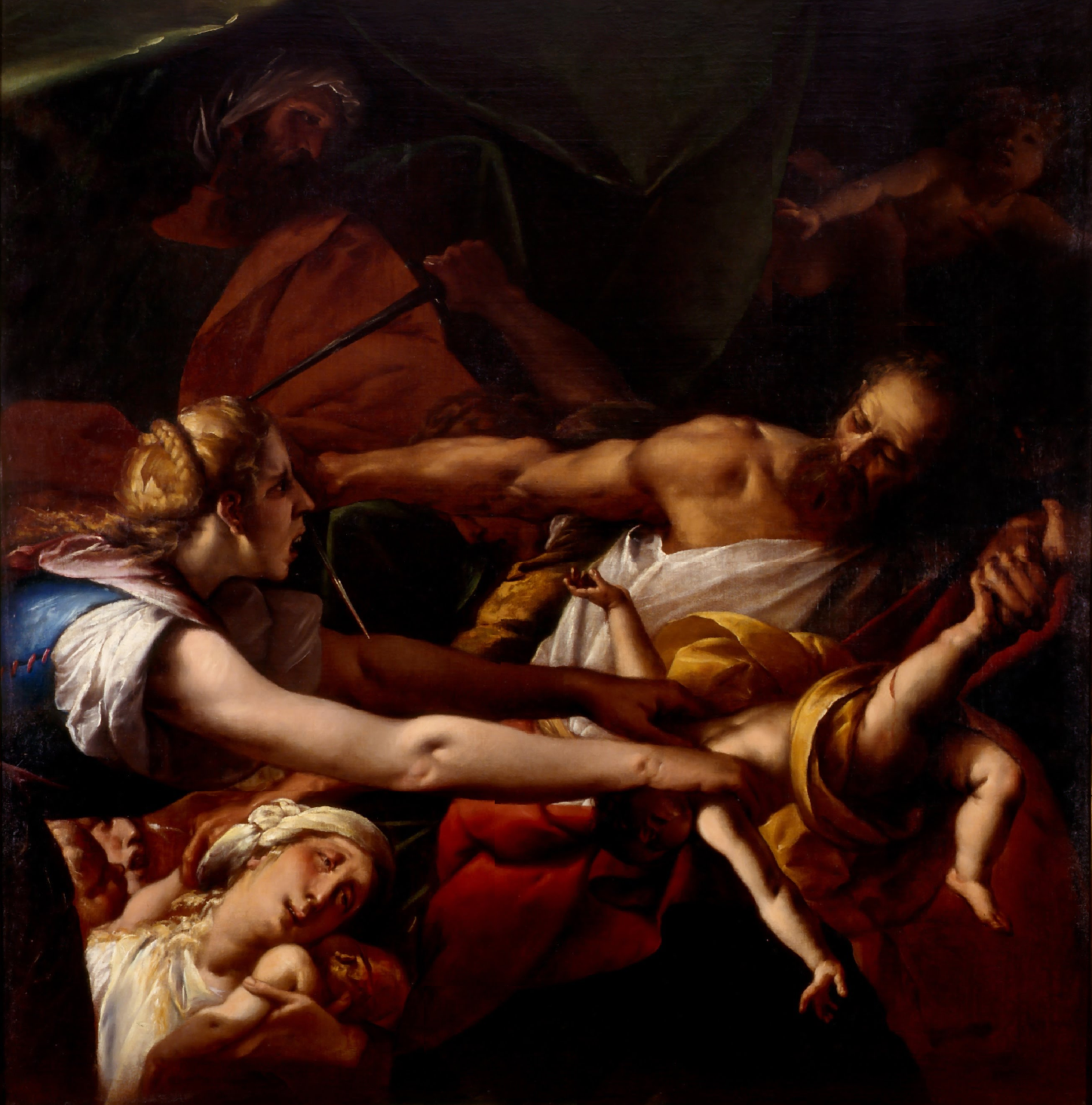
The Massacre of the Innocents, c. 1620, Diocesan Museum of Milan

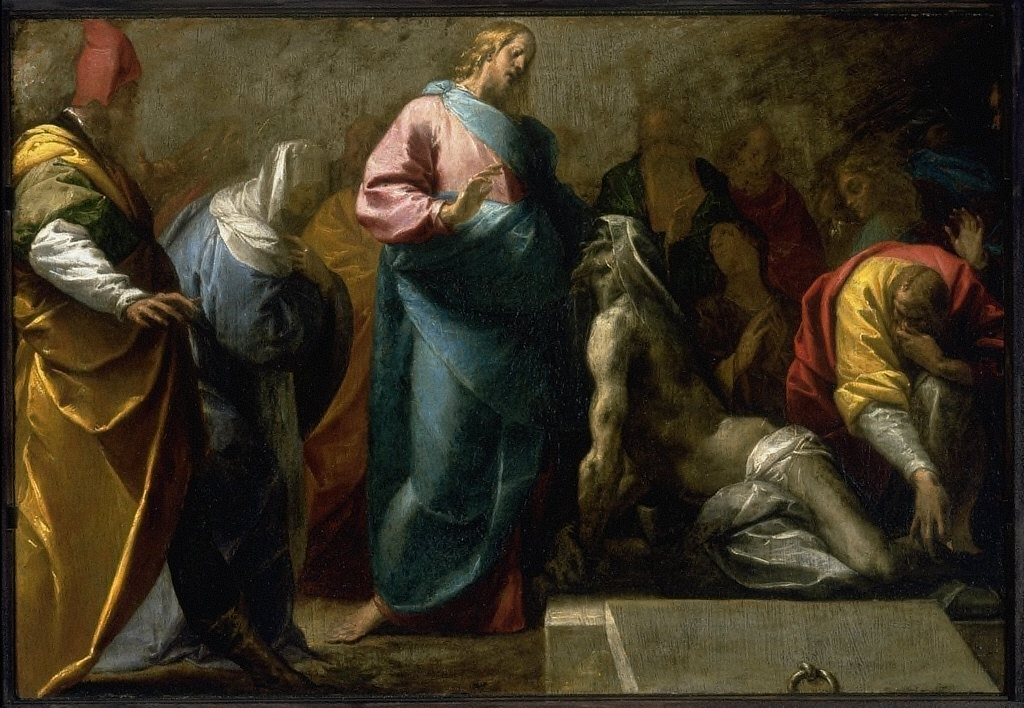
The Resurrection of Lazarus, c. 1620, Ottawa, National Gallery of Canada

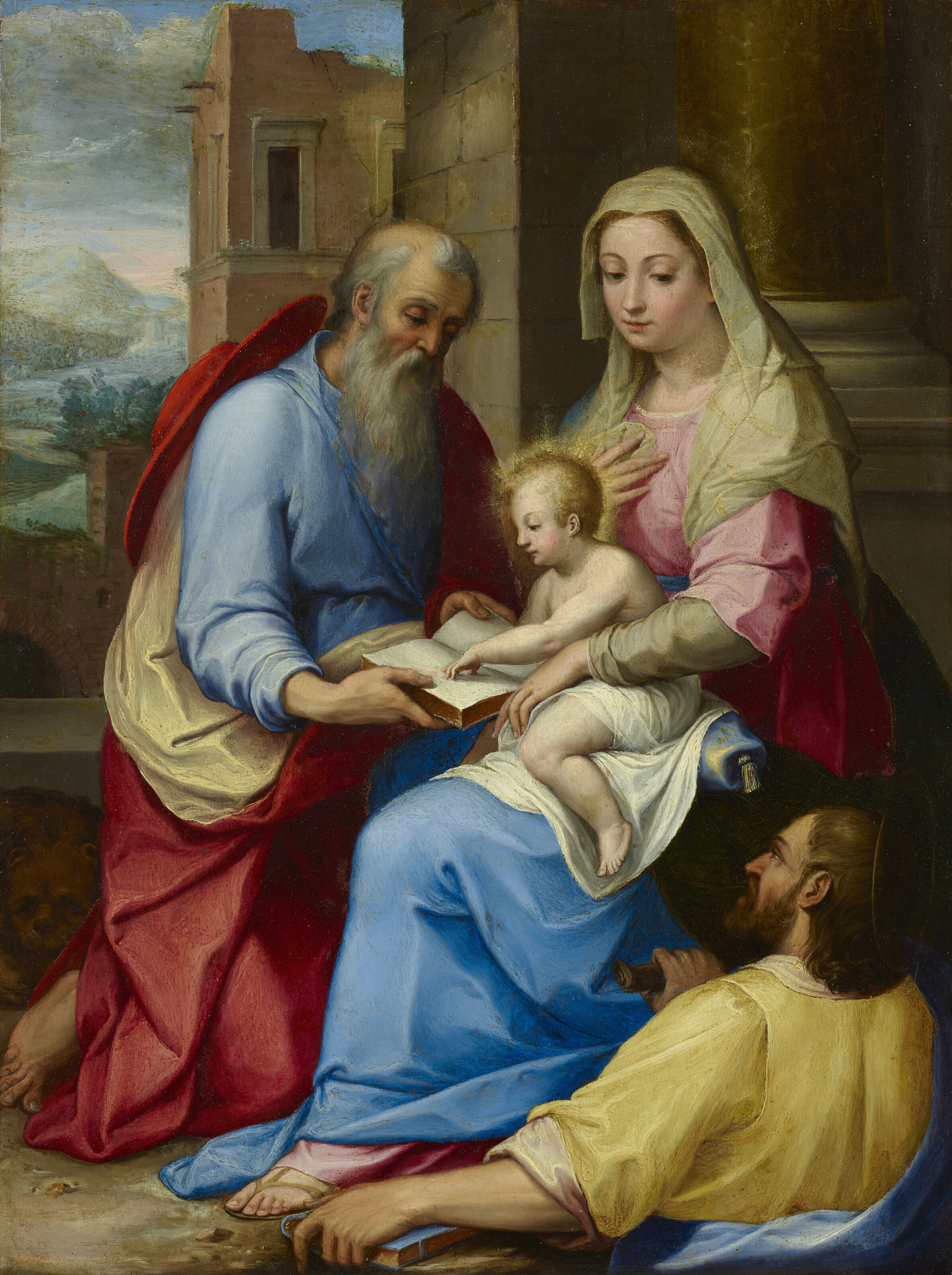
The Holy Family, priv. col.

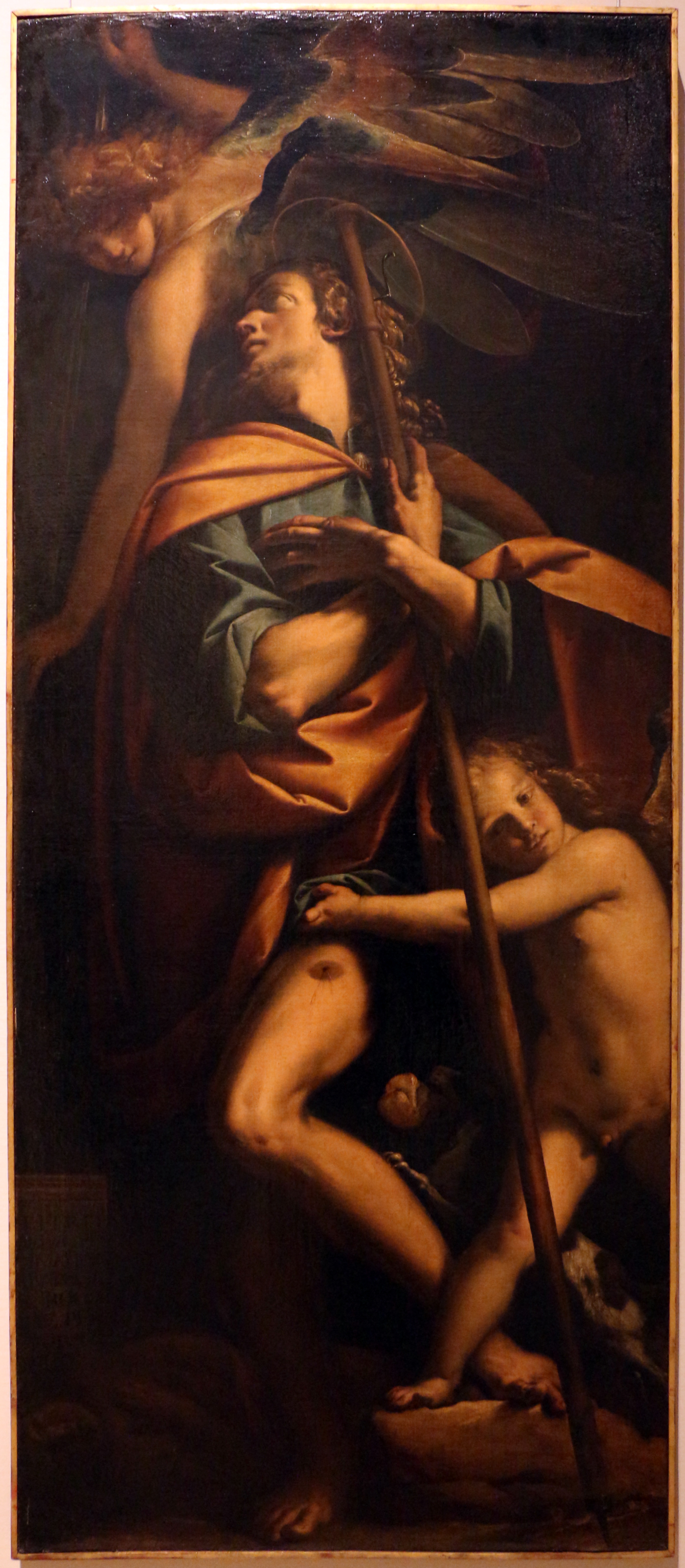
St. Roch, Palazzo dei Giureconsulti, Milan

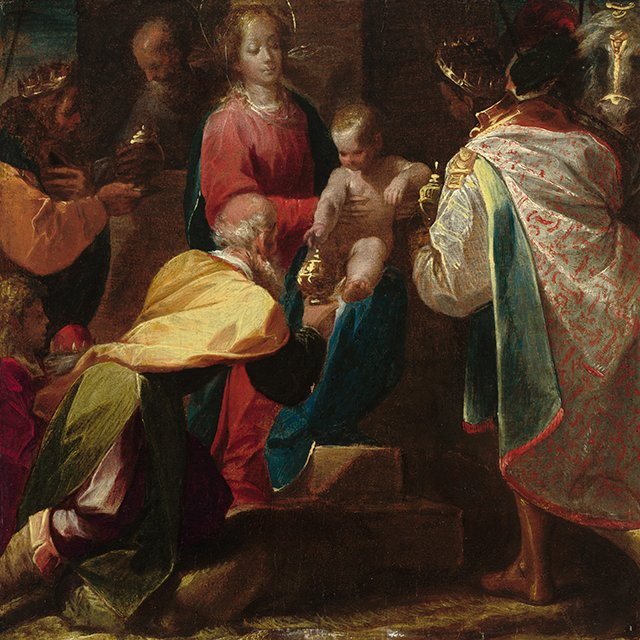
The Adoration of the Magi, c. 1600, National Gallery of Art, Washington, D.C.

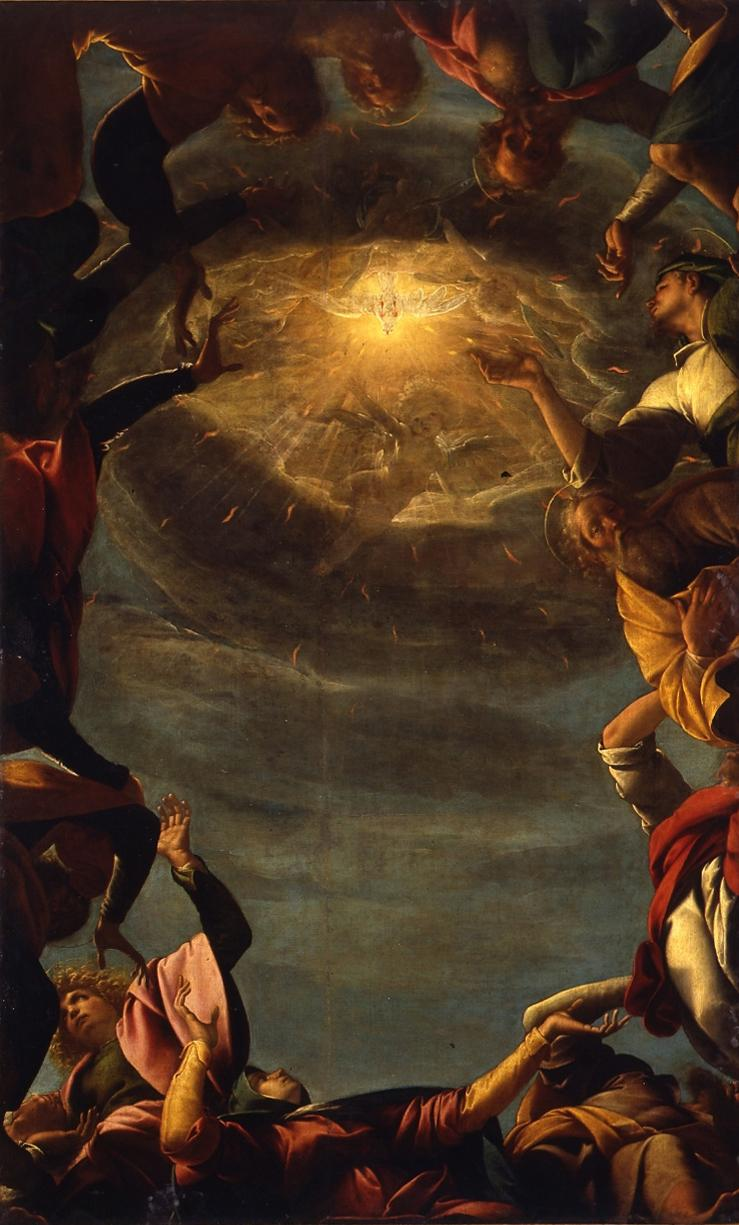
The Pentecost, Sforza Castle, Milan

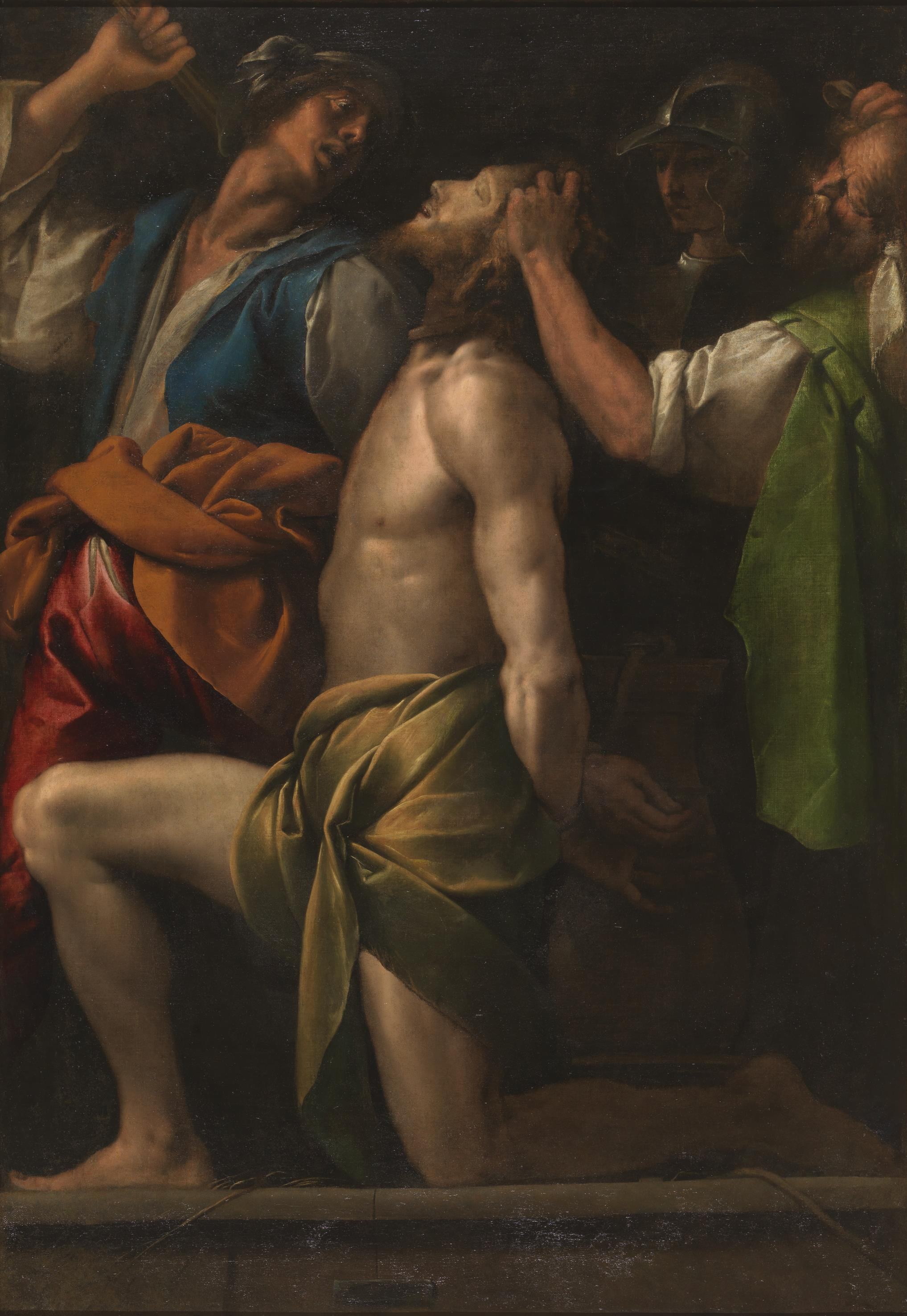
The Flagelation, Museo del Prado, Madrid

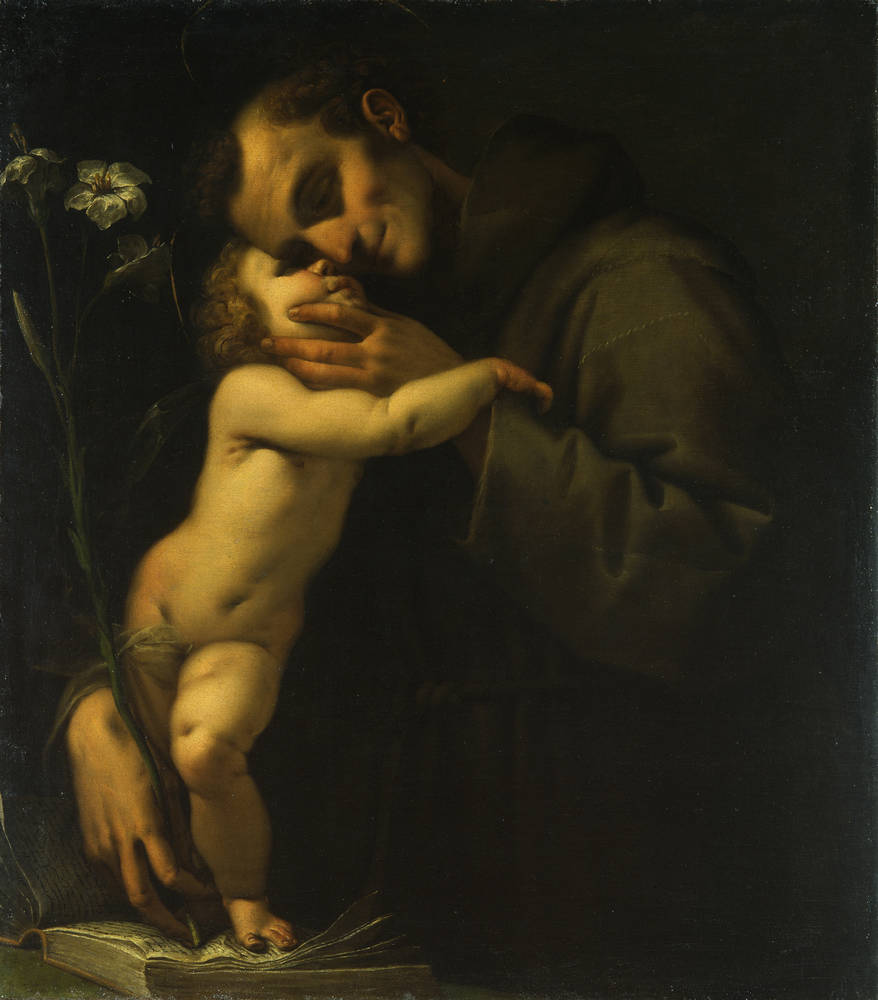
Saint Anthony with the Child Jesus, c. 1626, Gemäldegalerie Alte Meister, Dresda

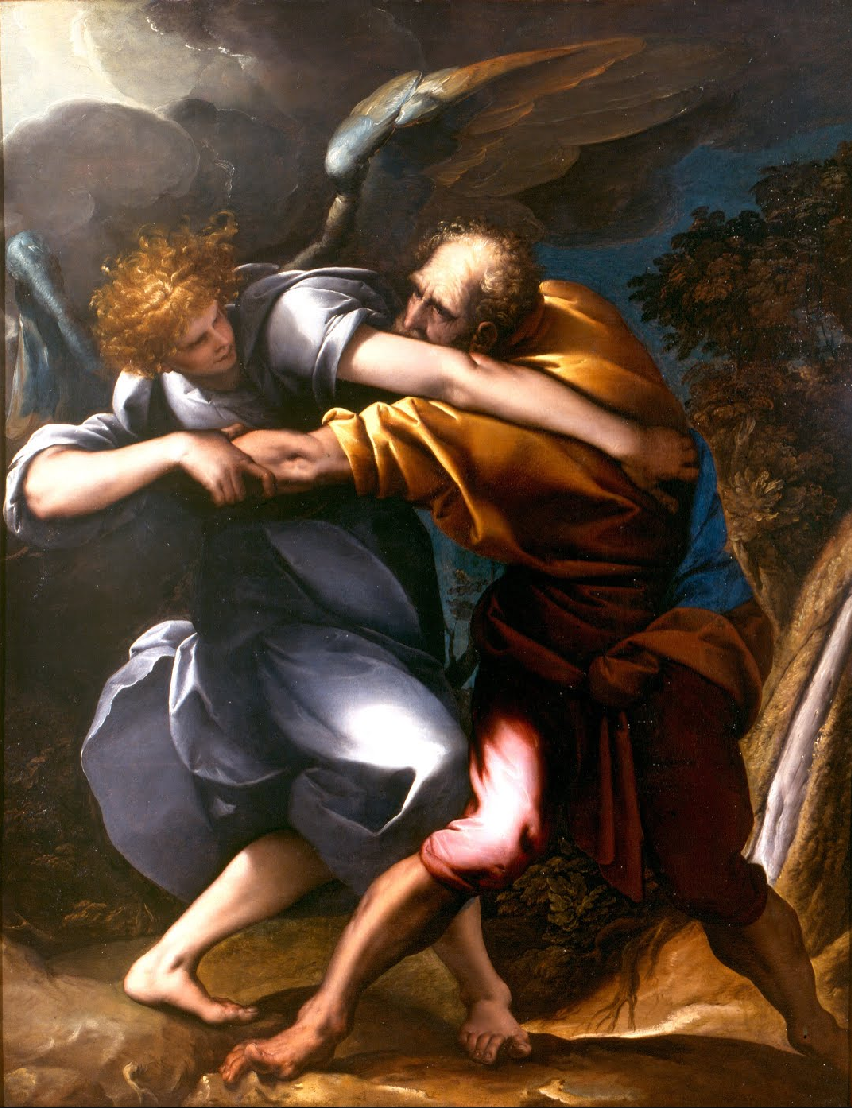
Jacob wrestling with the angel, Diocesan Museum of Milan

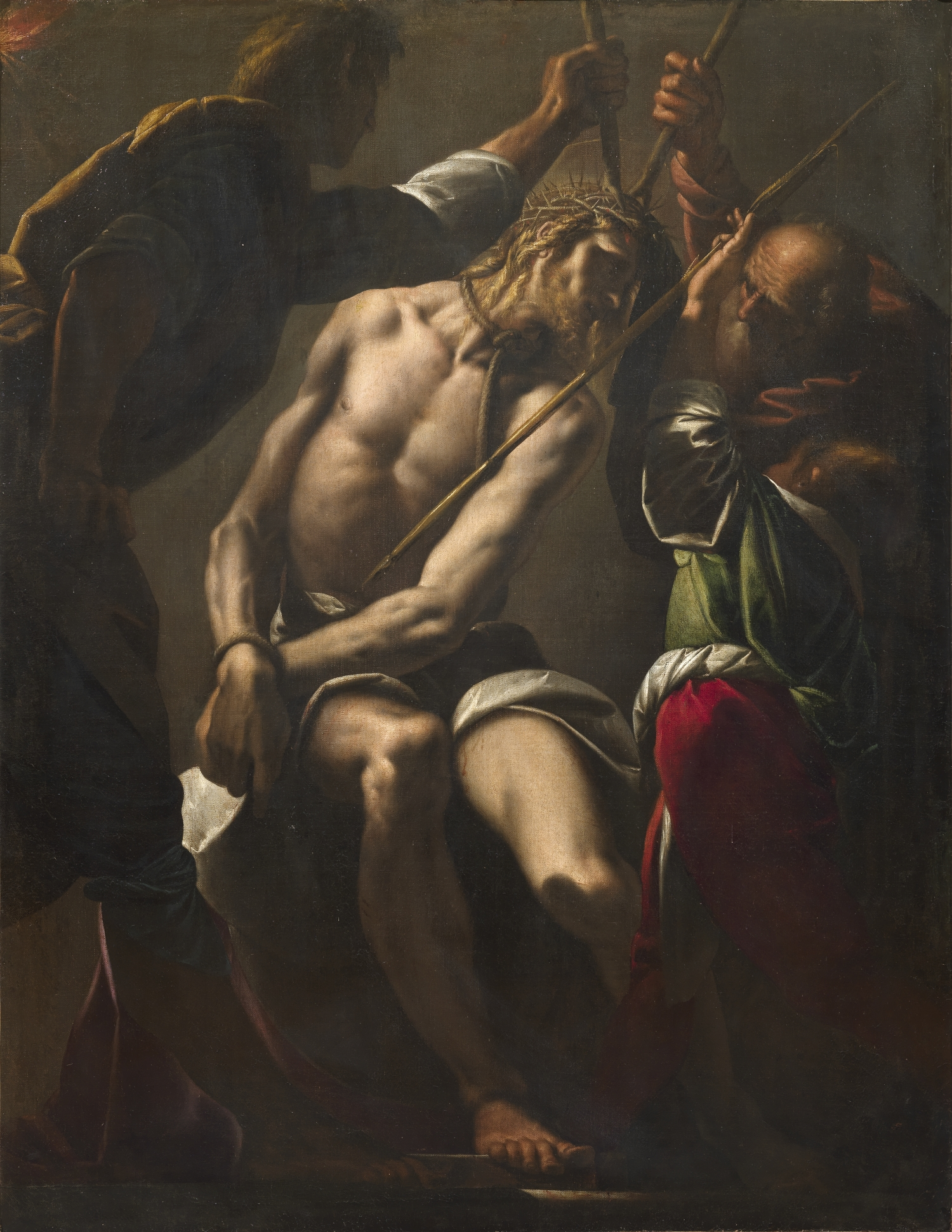
The Crowning with Thorns, c. 1610, Fondazione Roberto Longhi, Florence

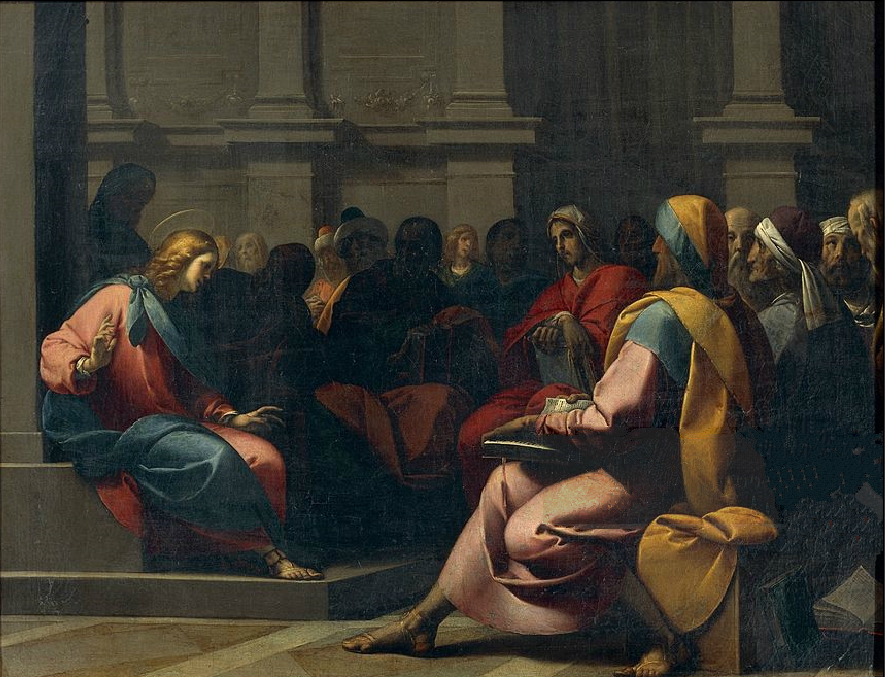
Christ Among the Doctors, c. 1616, Pinacoteca Ambrosiana, Milan

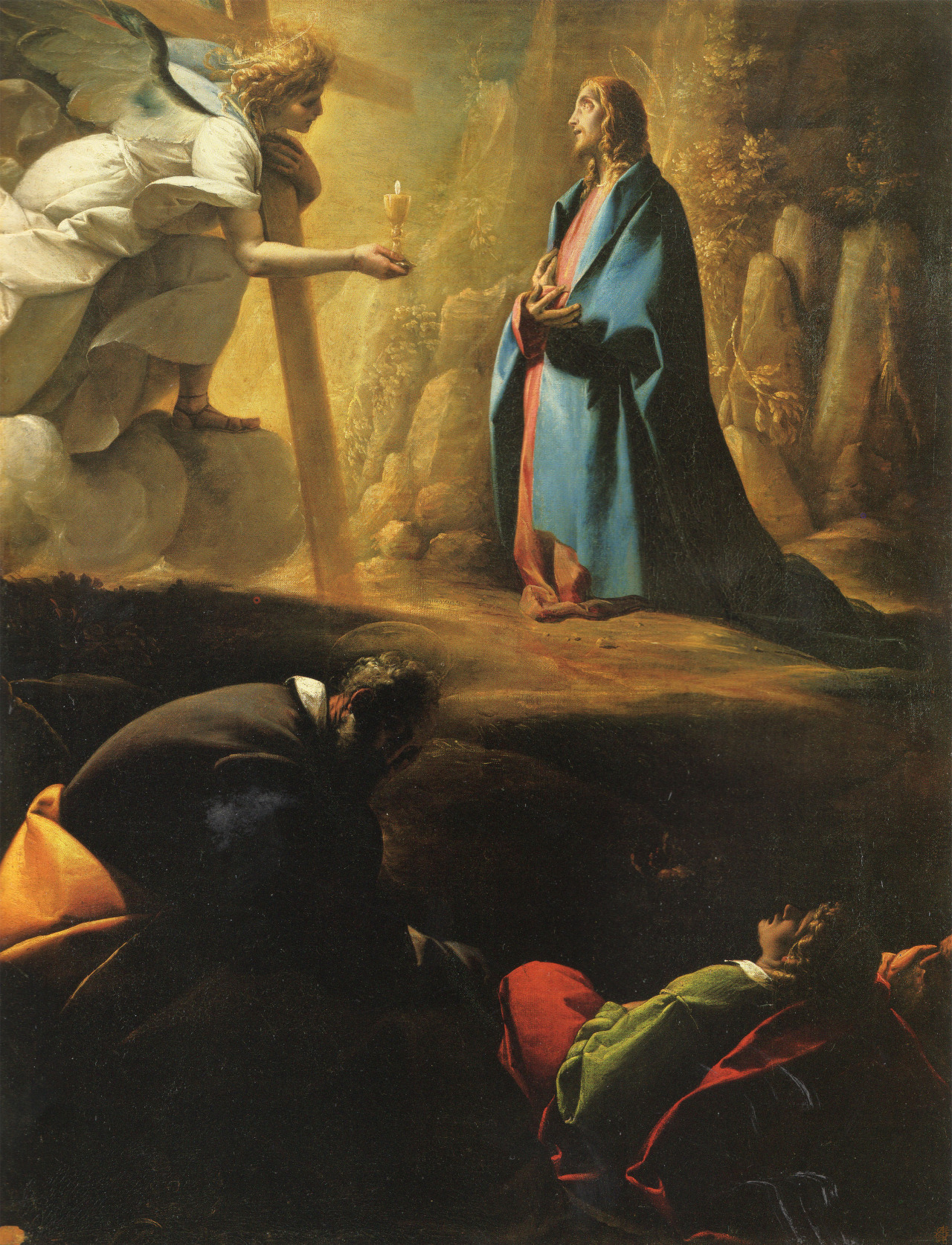
Agony in the Garden, c. 1612, priv. col.

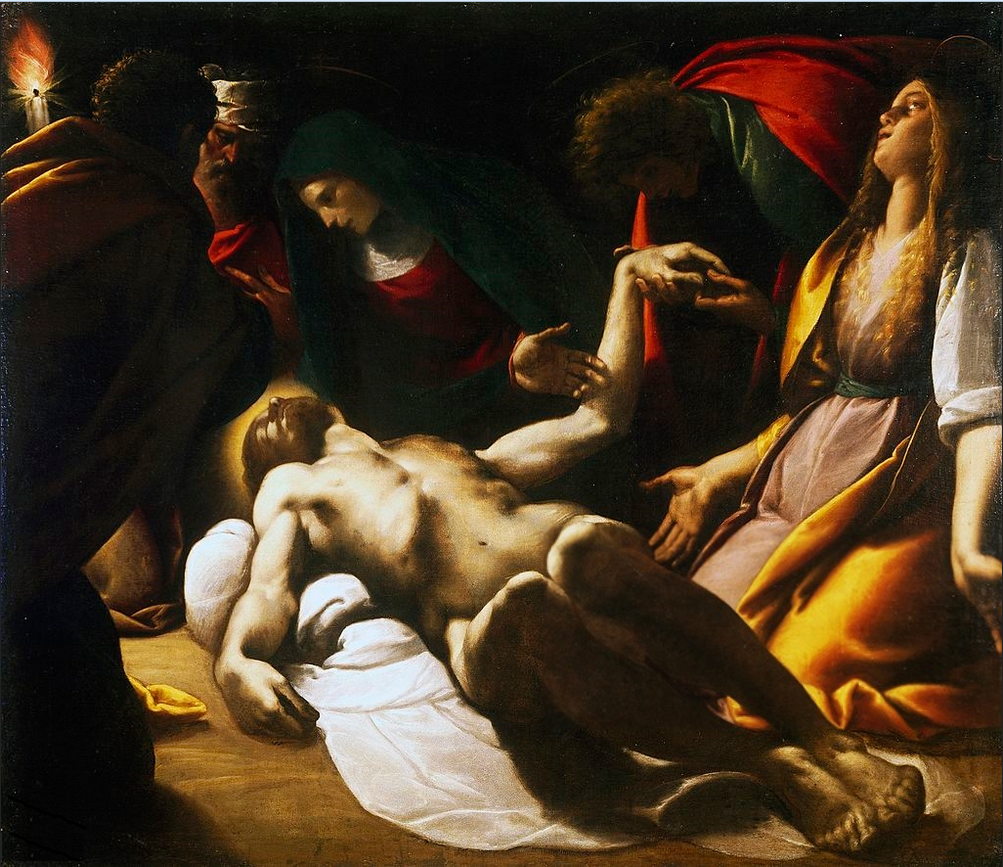
The Mourning of Christ, 1605–1618, Civico Museo d'Arte Moderna e Contemporanea, Varese

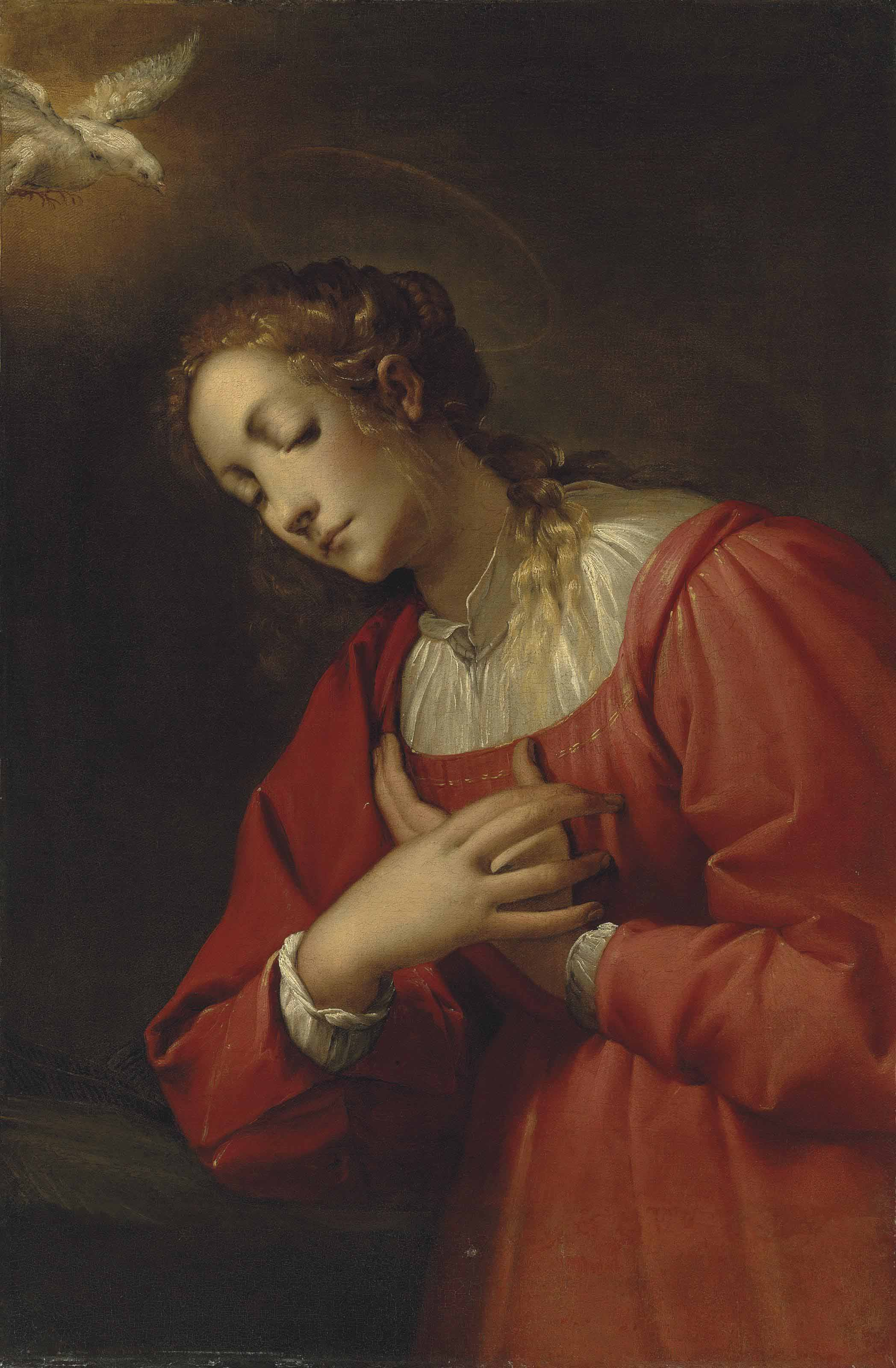
The Virgin Annunciate, 1609, Crocker Art Museum, Sacramento

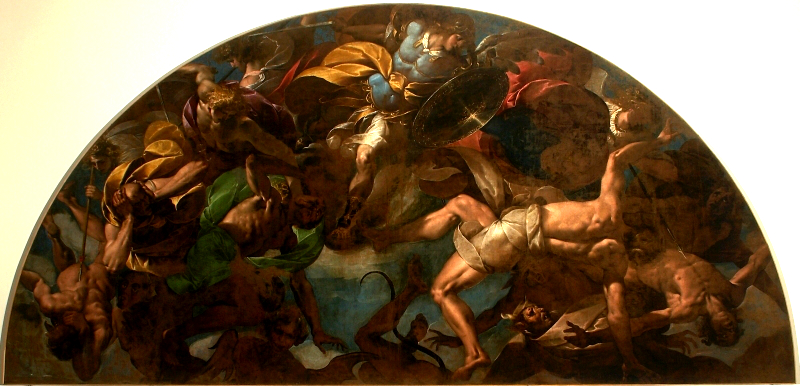
The Fall of the Rebel Angels, 1608–1610, Pinacoteca Civica, Como

== Sources ==
- Borsieri, Girolamo (1619). Il supplimento delle nobiltà di Milano. Milan: Bidelli.
- Wittkower, Rudolf (1993). "Art and Architecture Italy, 1600-1750". Pelican History of Art. 1980. Penguin Books. pp. 98–102.
- Stoppa, Jacopo (2003). Il Morazzone. Milan: 5 Continents Editions.
- Lanzi, Luigi (1822). Storia Pittorica della Italia dal Risorgimento delle Belle Arti Fin Presso al Fini del XVIII Secolo. Vol. 4 (4th ed.). Florence: Presso Filippo Marchini. pp. 204–205.
