= Santa Teresa, Turin =

Church of Saint Teresa of Avila
- Chiesa di Santa Teresa d'Avila
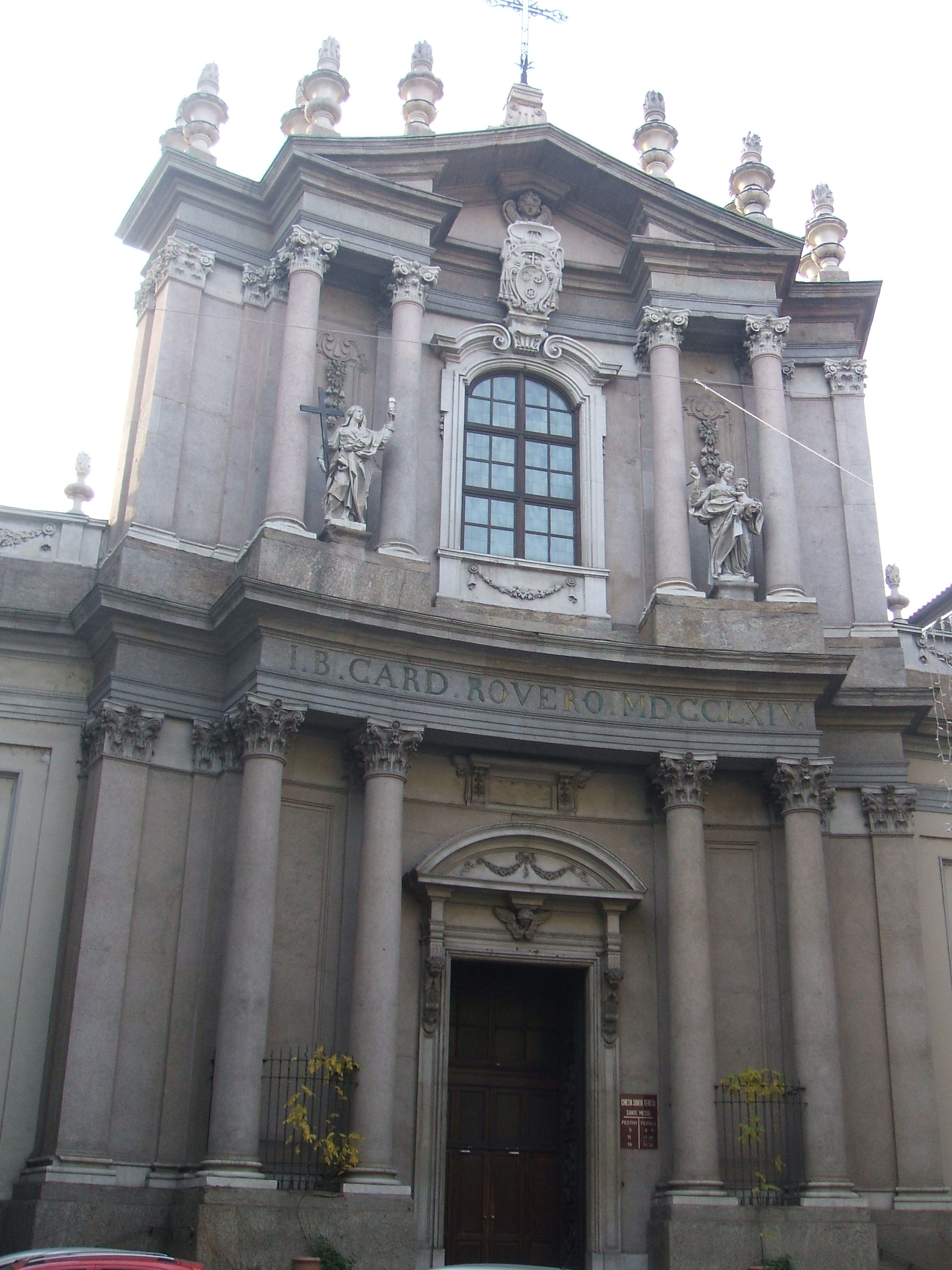
- Façade of the church

- 45.0689°N 7.6811°E
- Country: Italy
- Denomination: Roman Catholic Church

History
- Dedication: Saint Teresa of Ávila

Architecture
- Groundbreaking: 1642
- Completed: 1672

The Church of Saint Teresa of Ávila (Italian: Chiesa di Santa Teresa d'Avila) is a Baroque-style church located on Via Santa Teresa, near Piazza San Carlo in Turin, Italy.

== History ==
Construction for this church originally belonging to the Carmelite Order, was begun in 1642 and was completed in 1672 under the patronage of the Ducal Regent, Christine Marie of France. Her ashes are kept in the Chapel of St Erasmus. Much of the stone came from the adjacent Roman Porta Marmorea, razed during the enlargement of the city limits. The traditional architect is Andrea Costaguta with a façade by Aliberti completed in 1764. A small square in front of the church is delimited by modern buildings, including the western facade of the Torre XX Settembre.

The paternal grandparents of Pope Francis, Giuseppe Bergoglio and Rosa Vassallo got married in Santa Teresa on August 20, 1907 and one year later their oldest son Mario Giuseppe Bergoglio, Pope Francis' father got baptized here as well on April 6, 1908, four days after his birth. Pope Francis visited Santa Teresa spontaneously during his Turin visit on the eve of June 21, 2015.

== Interior ==
The original main altarpiece was a Ste Theresa of Avila, the Virgin, and St Joseph by Guglielmo Caccia (il Moncalvo).

Of the eight chapels, the Chapel of St Joseph was built in 1725 under the patronage of King Carlo Emanuele III, fulfilling the pledge by his second wife, Polyxena of Hesse-Rotenburg. The chapel was designed by Filippo Juvarra. The interior has sculptures by Simone Martinez; the ceiling was frescoed by Corrado Giaquinto, who also completed the two lateral canvases, with a Flight from Egypt and Death of St Joseph.

An adjacent chapel has a canvas of St Joseph and Child Jesus by Sebastiano Conca; the altar sculptures are by Antonio Tantardini. Other chapel altarpieces are by Tarquinio Grassi (St Erasmus); Ignazio Nepote; Rodolfo Morgari (Apparition of Angel to St Joseph); Antonio Francesco Peruzzini; Giovanni Paolo Recchi (Via Crucis); Tommaso Aldrovandini and Giovanni Antonio Burrini (fresco of Souls of Purgatory); and an Icon of St Anne by Vittorio Rapous.
