= Gioseffo Danedi =

Italian painter (1618–1689)

Gioseffo Danedi (1618–1689) was an Italian painter of the late-Renaissance period.

He was born at Treviglio, and was the brother of Giovanni Stefano Danedi, and together, they were known as the Montalti. Both received instruction from the Milanese painter Pier Francesco Mazzucchelli (il Morazzone). Gioseffo painted in Turin and Milan, including a Murder of the Innocents in the church of San Sebastiano. He was influenced by Guido Reni. One of his pupils was Tarquinio Grassi.
