= Giovanni Stefano Danedi =

Italian painter (1608/1612–1690)

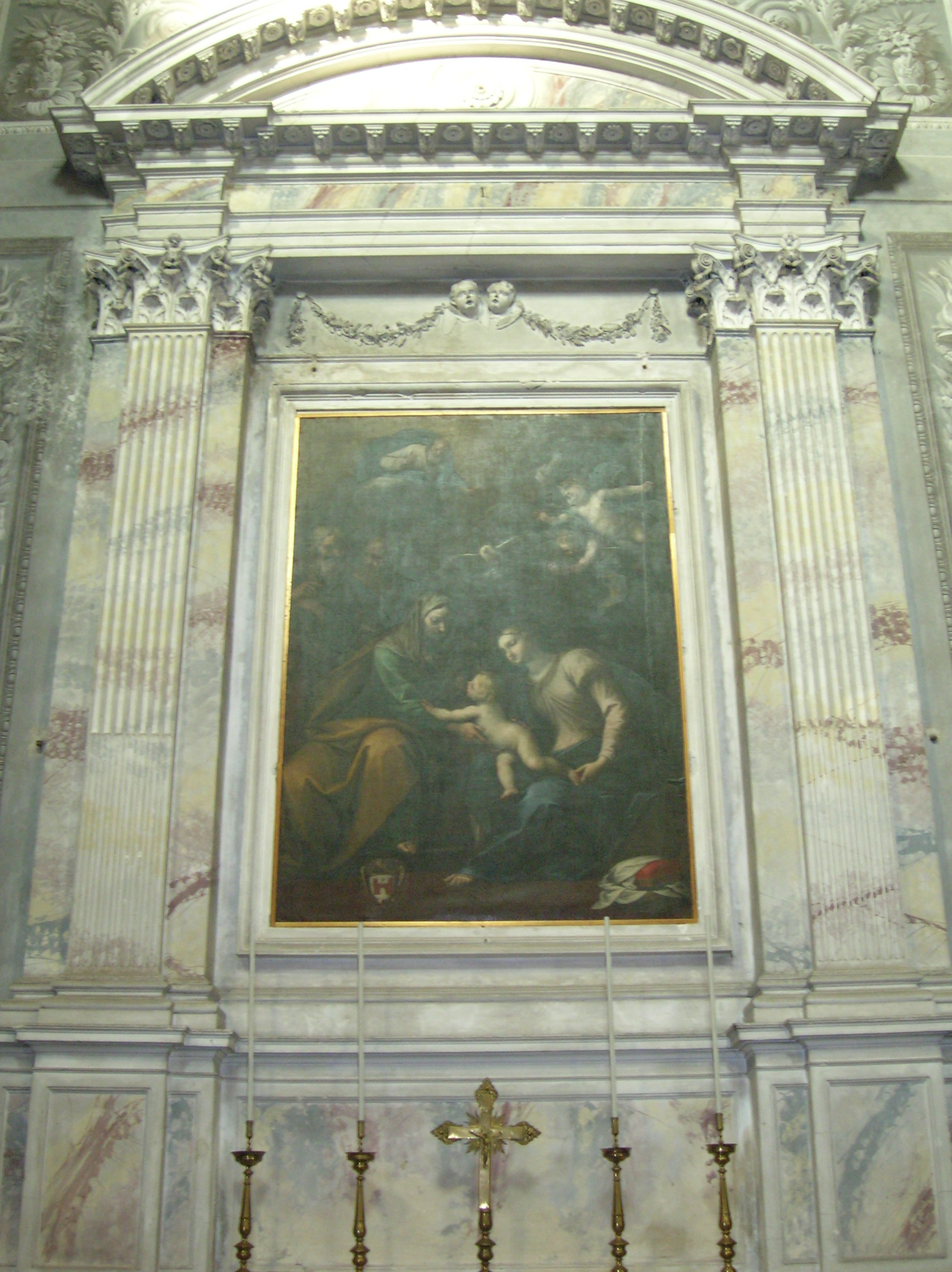
Giovanni Stefano Danedi, Madonna, Saint Anne and the Child Jesus, church of Santo Crocifisso, Asso

Giovanni Stefano Danedi (1608 or 1612–1690) was an Italian painter of the Baroque period. he is also known as Stefano Montalti.

== Biography ==
He was born at Treviglio, and was the brother of Gioseffo Danedi, also a painter called il Montalto and also a pupil of the painter Pier Francesco Mazzucchelli (il Morazzone) while in Milan. In Milan, he contributed to the decoration of Santa Maria della Grazie and the Church of the Carmine. Also painted frescoes (1648) in the presbytery of the Cathedral of Monza. Danedi also painted a series of frescoes (1656) for the Villa Frisiani Mereghetti in Corbeto and (1671-788) for two chapels on the right of the church of the Certosa di Pavia. He also painted for the Sanctuary at the Sacro Monte of Varallo. He died in Milan.

== Other projects ==
Media related to Giovanni Stefano Danedi at Wikimedia Commons
