= Torre XX Settembre =

Coordinates: 45.0686°N 7.6814°E

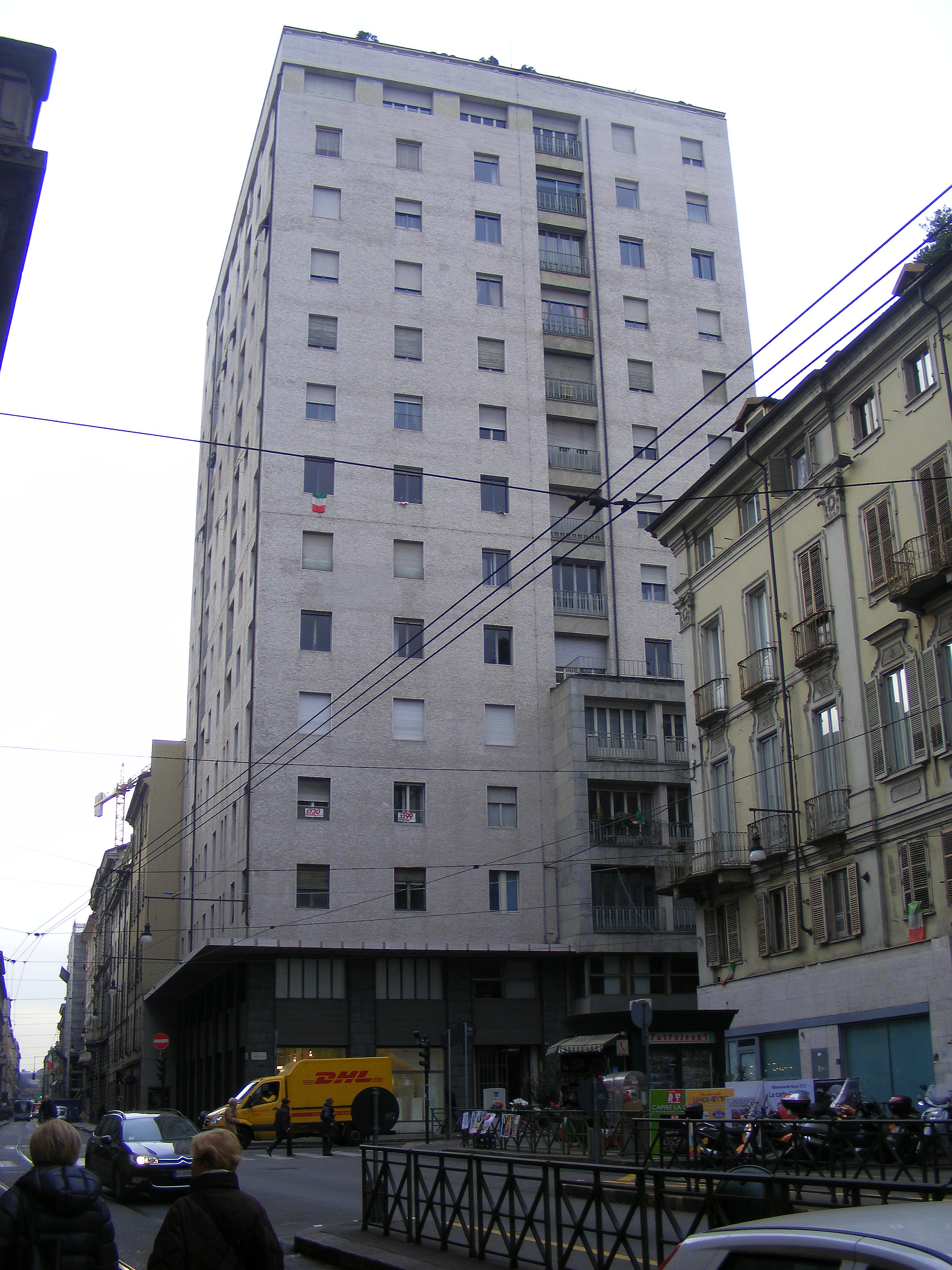
- Interactive map of the Torre XX Settembre area

General information
- Type: Residential and office building
- Architectural style: Rationalist
- Location: Via Santa Teresa, 3, Turin, Italy
- Groundbreaking: 1939
- Construction started: 1947
- Completed: 1951

Technical details
- Material: Concrete
- Floor count: 14

Design and construction
- Architects: Gino Salvestrini, Gabriello Gabrielli di Quercita

Torre XX Settembre, in Turin, is one of the earliest examples of Modernist skyscraper in Italy.

The building was designed in 1939 by Gino Salvestrini and Gabriello Gabrielli di Quercita. Because of the outbreak of the Second World War, however, works started only in 1947 and were completed in 1951.

== Location ==
The high-rise building, also called Torre Santa Teresa or Grattacielo Santa Teresa, is located at the corner between via Santa Teresa and via XX Settembre, in central Turin. It owes its name to the day that marks the capture of Rome (20 September 1870), an event that was much celebrated by the Fascist Regime, during which time the building was originally designed. Its volume is clearly visible from Piazza San Carlo and was conceived as a Modernist counterpoint to the Baroque square.

== Structure ==
The building is composed of a 14-floor vertical structure and a 5-floor horizontal structure. Both structures are entirely covered by white limestone tesserae, with the exception of the two lowest floors where green marble and metal walls can be seen. Its western façade borders the small square in front of the church of Santa Teresa.

The dimensional proportion between the windows and the built mass reflects the architectural theories of Italian rationalism, while decoration of interior common spaces can be considered a late example of Art Deco style.
