= Giovanni Battista Recchi =

Italian painter

Giovanni Battista Recchi was an Italian painter of the 17th century, a pupil of Pier Francesco Mazzucchelli, and brother of Giovanni Paolo Recchi. Ho became well known at Turin, where he was working about 1660. He painted historical subjects, and was assisted in his studio by his nephew Giovanni Antonio Recchi.
