= Giuseppe Recchi =

Italian businessman and company manager

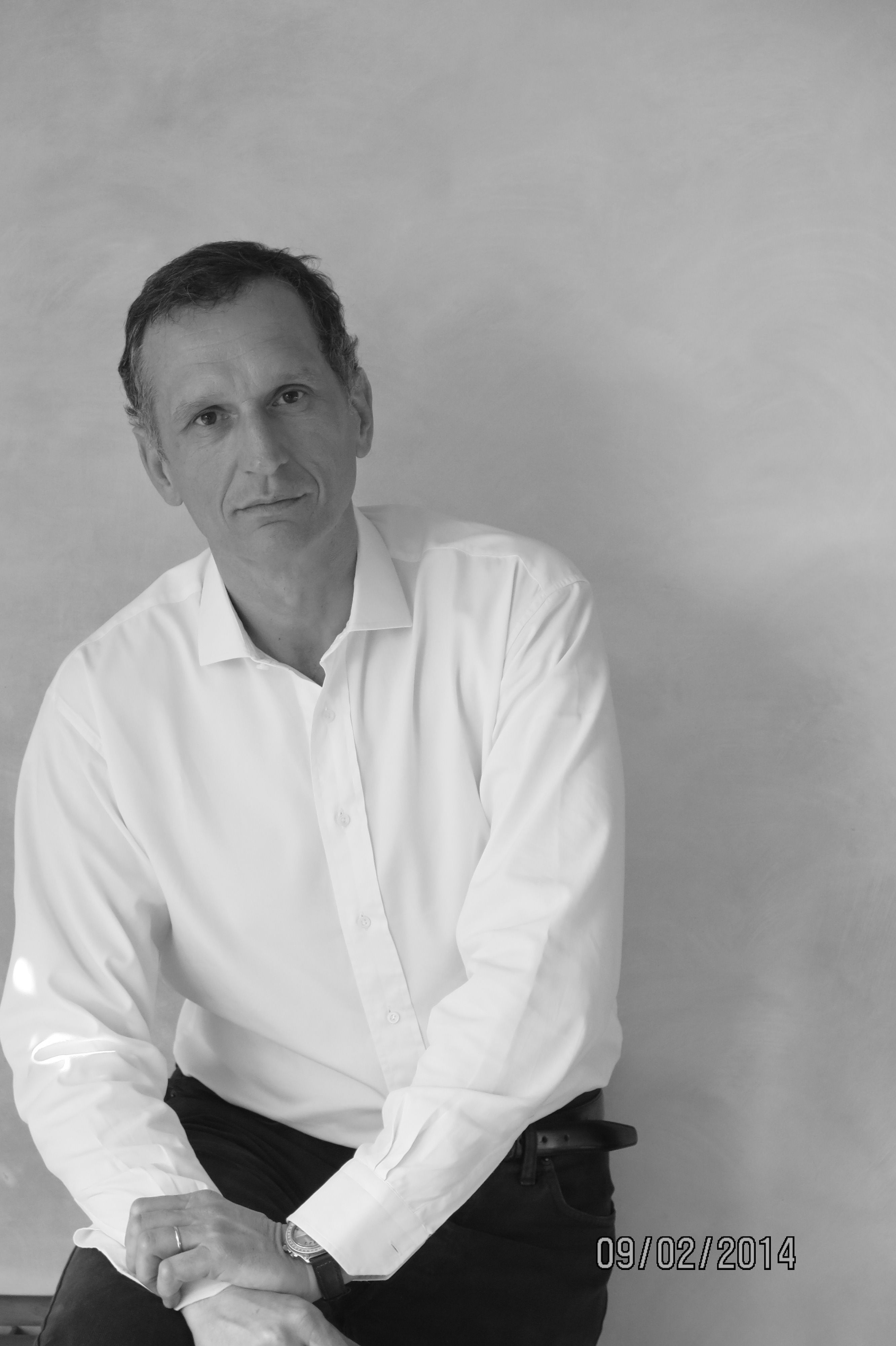
- Born: January 20, 1964 (age 62); Turin, Italy
- Education: Polytechnic University of Turin
- Occupations: Owner and manager of several companies
- Children: 3

Giuseppe Recchi (born 20 January 1964) is an Italian businessman and company manager. He was CEO and President of the General Electric Group of the Eni Group and of the Telecom Italia Group, and until September 2022 he was CEO Europe of the Affidaea Group, a leading European company in the health care sector.

== Early life and education ==
Born into a family of Turin businessmen, Giuseppe Recchi has started working for his Family’s firm, Impresa Recchi Costruzioni Generali, after earning his engineering degree at Turin's Polytechnic University in 1989. Founded in 1933, the company's main activities are related to the construction of large infrastructure, such as power stations, bridges, dams, highways and tunnelling projects in Italy and also in Africa, Latin America, North America and Asia.

In 1994, he became both Executive President of Recchi America Inc., the US branch of his family firm, and CEO of the constituent company responsible for the international activities of the Group which is today called Condotte S.p.A.

== Career ==
=== General Electric ===
In 1999, Recchi joined General Electric, the multinational corporation led at that time by Jack Welch. After two years spent in the US, Recchi returned to Europe, heading at first to London, where he was in charge of industrial acquisition for the Group in the EMEA area, and then to Italy where he became CEO and President of GE South Europe.

=== Eni ===
In May 2011, and after 12 years spent at General Electric, Recchi became Group President of Eni. On appointment he was, at 47 years of age, the youngest President ever in the company's history, along with its founder Enrico Mattei. During his time in charge, he was deeply involved in expanding access to energy markets to developing countries. This led to him to speaking at the United Nations in New York in front of Ban Ki-moon, during the Global Compact forum, representing the World Business Council for Sustainable Development (WBCSD). He subsequently took part in Rio+20, United Nations Conference on Sustainable Development, in 2012, when he also became the World Economic Forum’s spokesperson, to debate measures tackling corruption, during the 2012 G20 in Mexico. He remained President of Eni until spring 2014.

=== Telecom Italia ===
On April, 16th 2014, Telecom Italia's shareholders' council elected Giuseppe Recchi as the Board of Directors' new Chairman, gaining 97,92% of the votes. On June 26, 2014, the board of directors promoted him to executive chairman. He later became the chairman of Telecom Italia’s Foundation, which promotes projects advancing access to digital technologies in Italy. On March 22, 2016, Marco Patuano, Telecom Italia's CEO resigned and Giuseppe Recchi was appointed interim CEO until Flavio Cattaneo took up the role on March 30, 2016. On June 2, 2017, following the appointment of a new shareholder representative as Chairman, he was elected Deputy Chairman of Telecom Italia.

=== Affidea ===
On January, 25th 2018, Giuseppe Recchi was appointed CEO of Affidea Group BV, a leading European provider of diagnostic imaging, cancer treatment and outpatient services operating from 245 centres in 16 countries. He has continued to grow Affidea by opening new treatment centres, through the acquisition of other healthcare providers and by expanding its range of core services. In May 2018 the group reported that it had over 7,500 health professionals and performed almost 13 million examinations for more than 6,5 million patients every year.

== Personal life ==
Giuseppe Recchi is married and has three children. Keen on sports, he is an amateur participant in sailing and motorcycling competitions. He has participated in several national and international competitions, such as Morocco Rally race in 2013.

== Academic experiences and publications ==
From 2004 to 2006 Giuseppe Recchi was Visiting Professor of Corporate Finance at the University of Turin. In 2014, his book, called “Nuove energie. Le sfide per lo sviluppo dell'occidente” (New energies. Challenges for Occidental development) was published by Marsilio editions, with an introduction by Sergio Romano.

== Awards and recognitions ==
On May, 6th 2015 Recchi received, at the Regina hall in Montecitorio, the Guido Carli award, which was awarded to Italian citizens to recognise their excellence in the fields of economy, finance, culture and social affairs. On June, 2nd 2017 he was awarded the Order of Merit for Labour by the President of the Republic of Italy, Sergio Mattarella.

== Honours ==
Cavaliere del Lavoro - 1 Giugno 2017
