= Giovanni Paolo Recchi =

Italian painter and architect

Giovanni Paolo Recchi (mid-17th century) was an Italian painter and architect of the Baroque period.

Born in Como. He worked in Turin and the Duchy of Savoy in fresco, with the assistance of his nephew Giovanni Antonio and his brother Giovanni Battista Recchi. Active in 1650.
